= List of Twisted Sister members =

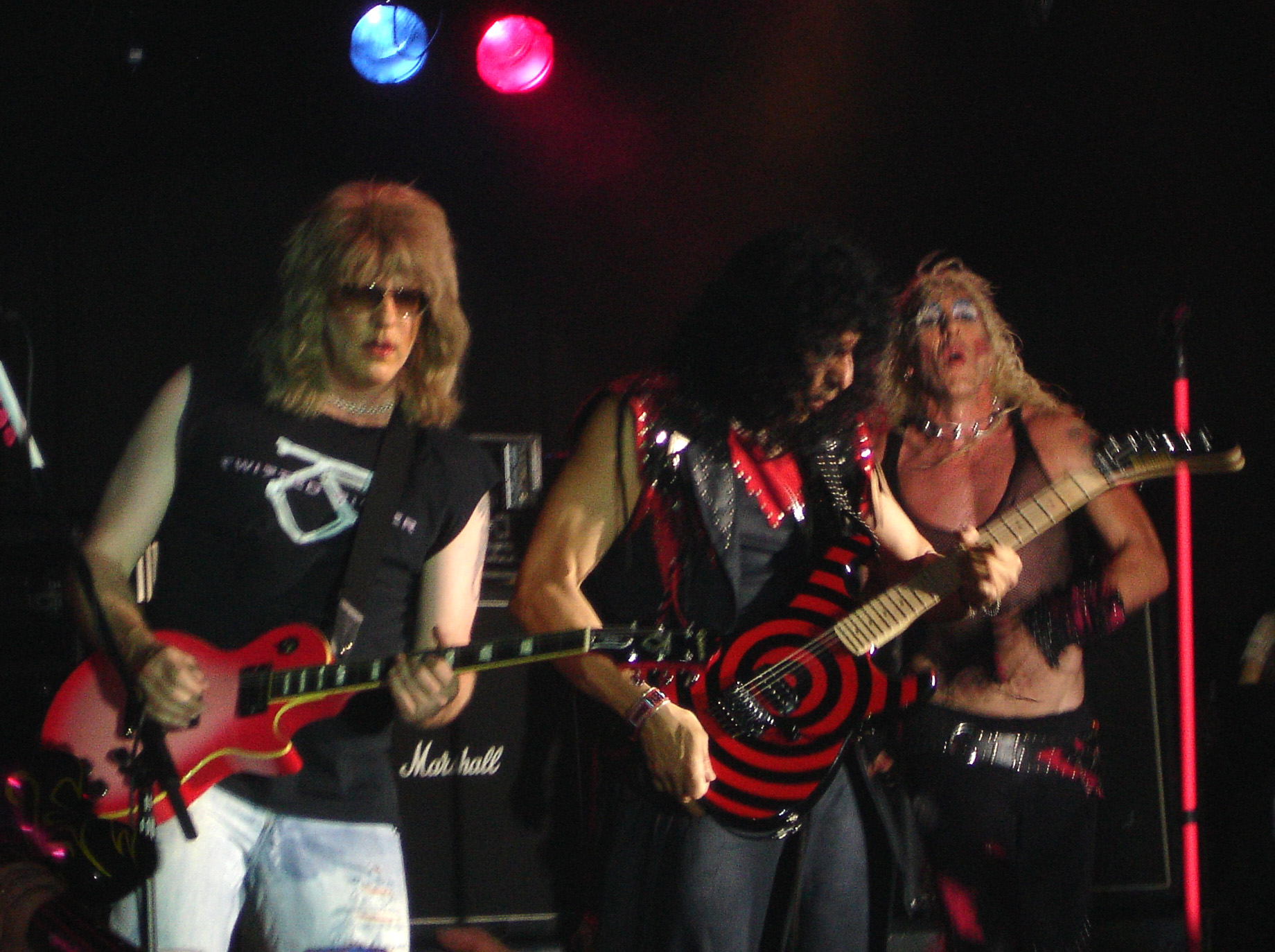
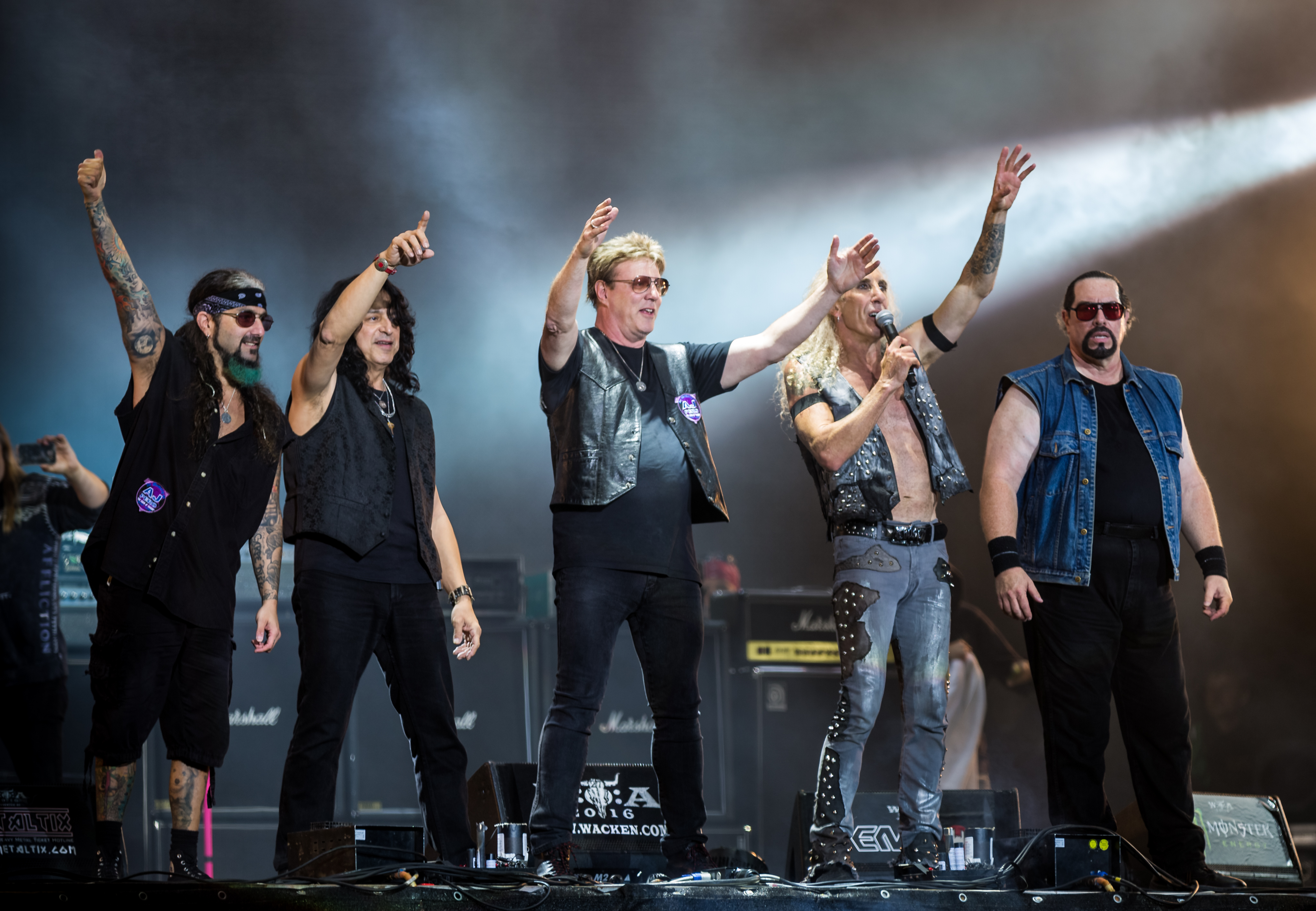
Two lineups of Twisted Sister in 2006 (top) and 2016 (bottom).

Twisted Sister is an American heavy metal band from Ho-Ho-Kus, New Jersey. Formed in late December 1972 as cover band Silver Star, the group changed its name to Twisted Sister in February 1973 and originally included lead vocalist Michael "Valentine" O'Neill, guitarists Jay Jay French and Billy "Diamond" Steiger, bassist Kenny Neill and drummer Mel "Starr" Anderson. The band took a short hiatus in December 1974, after O'Neill instigated a fight with Anderson and threatened to shoot the drummer. They returned early the following year with new vocalist Frank "Rick Prince" Karuba and guitarist Keith "Angel" Angelino (in place of Steiger), although both had left before the end of the year, with French and Angelino's replacement Eddie "Fingers" Ojeda taking over lead vocal duties temporarily before another short hiatus.

By February 1976, Twisted Sister had returned with new frontman Dee Snider and drummer Kevin John Grace. Tony Petri took over on drums a few months later. Neill left two years later in December 1978, with his place taken by Mark "The Animal" Mendoza. The band changed drummers three more times in the early 1980s, first when Richie Teeter replaced Petri in December 1980, followed by Joey Brighton in April 1981, and finally by Anthony "A. J." Pero in April 1982. The lineup of Snider, French, Ojeda, Mendoza and Pero released four studio albums between 1982 and 1985, before Pero left in 1986 to rejoin his former band Cities. He was replaced by Joey "Seven" Franco, who performed on the group's last album Love Is for Suckers before breaking up in early 1988, following Snider's departure in October 1987.

Twisted Sister reunited in 1998 to record "Heroes Are Hard to Find" for the film Strangeland, written and co-produced by Snider. The band reformed again to perform live for the first time in 14 years at New York Steel in November 2001, a benefit concert for organisations affected by the September 11 attacks. A more permanent reunion followed in 2003, spawning new studio recordings and live releases. The band retained the same lineup until March 2015, when Pero died of a heart attack while touring with Adrenaline Mob. Following the drummer's death, the band announced that it was to embark on a final tour before breaking up in 2016, enlisting Mike Portnoy to take over for (late) A.J. Pero. The final Twisted Sister show took place on November 12, 2016, in Monterrey, Mexico at the Corona Northside Rock Park Meeting Fest.

The band reunited on January 26, 2023 playing a 3 song set for their induction into the Metal Hall of Fame. The line up consisted of inductees Dee Snider, Jay Jay French and Mark Mendoza with Mike Portnoy filling in for inductee A.J. Pero and Keith Robert War filling in for inductee Eddie Ojeda. The band was scheduled to reunite again in 2024 for appearances at various Democrat political rallies in the 2024 election season.

The band announced their reunion in September 2025 for shows in 2026. The reunion would have marked the return of drummer Joey Franco, as well as new bassist Russell Pzütto. Mendoza was not included due to 'irreconcilable differences'.

On February 6, 2026, the band announced Snider's resignation on health grounds and the cancellation of the 50th anniversary tour. He was replaced by ex-Skid Row frontman Sebastian Bach.

== Members ==
=== Current lineup ===
Image	Name	Years active	Instruments	Release contributions
	Jay Jay French	1972–1988; 1998; 2001; 2003–2016; 2023; 2025–present	lead and rhythm guitars; backing vocals (also lead vocals from 1975 to 1976)	all Twisted Sister releases
	Eddie "Fingers" Ojeda	1975–1988; 1998; 2001; 2003–2016; 2025–present	lead and rhythm guitars; backing vocals (also lead vocals from 1975 to 1976)	all Twisted Sister releases
	Russell Pzütto	2025–present (touring 2013)	bass; backing vocals	none
	Sebastian Bach	2026–present	vocals	none
	Joey Cassata	2026–present	drums	none

=== Other members ===
Image	Name	Years active	Instruments	
	Kenny Neill	1973–1978	bass	Club Daze Volume 1: The Studio Sessions (1999)
	Mel "Starr" Anderson	1973–1975	drums	none
	Michael "Valentine" O'Neill	1973–1974	lead vocals	none
	Billy "Diamond" Steiger	1973–1974 (died 2015)	lead and rhythm guitars	none
	Keith "Angel" Angelino	1975 (died 1986)	lead and rhythm guitars	none
	Frank "Rick Prince" Karuba	1975 (died 2025)	lead vocals	none
	Kevin John Grace	1975–1976	drums	none
	Tony Petri	1976–1980 (died 2024)	drums	"I'll Never Grow Up, Now!" (1979); "Bad Boys (Of Rock N' Roll)" (1980); Ruff Cutts (1982); Live at Hammersmith (1994) – two tracks only; Club Daze Volume 1: The Studio Sessions (1999); Club Daze Volume II: Live in the Bars (2002); Live at Wacken: The Reunion (2003) – four bonus CD tracks only
	Dee Snider	1976–1988; 1998; 2001; 2003–2016; 2023; 2025–2026	lead vocals; occasional guitar	All Twisted Sister releases
	Mark "The Animal" Mendoza	1978–1988; 1998; 2001; 2003–2016; 2023	bass; backing vocals	All Twisted Sister releases
	Ritchie Teeter	1980–1981 (died 2012)	drums	none
	Joey Brighton	1981–1982 (died 2010)	drums	Ruff Cutts (1982); Club Daze Volume 1: The Studio Sessions (1999)
	Walt Woodward III	1982 (died 2010)	drums	none
	Anthony "A. J." Pero	1982–1986; 1998; 2001; 2003–2015 (until his death)	drums; percussion; backing vocals	all Twisted Sister releases from Under the Blade (1982) to Come Out and Play (1985), and from Live at Hammersmith (1994) to A Twisted X-Mas: Live in Las Vegas (2012)
	Joey "Seven" Franco	1986–1988; 2025	drums	Love Is for Suckers (1987); Feel Appeal: Love Is for Suckers Extras (2021)
	Mike Portnoy	2015–2016; 2023	drums; percussion; backing vocals	Metal Meltdown: Live from the Hard Rock Casino Las Vegas (2016)
	Keith Robert War	2023	lead and rhythm guitars; backing vocals	none

== Lineups ==
Period	Members	Studio releases
1973–1974	Michael O'Neill – lead vocals; Jay Jay French – guitars, backing vocals; Kenny Neill – bass; Billy Steiger – guitars; Mel Anderson– drums	
1974–1975	Jay Jay French – guitars, backing vocals; Kenny Neill – bass; Mel Anderson – drums	
1975	Frank Karuba – lead vocals; Jay Jay French – guitars, backing vocals; Keith Angelino – guitars; Kenny Neill – bass; Mel Anderson – drums	
1975	Jay Jay French – guitars, vocals; Keith Angelino – guitars; Kenny Neill – bass; Mel Anderson – drums	
1975	Jay Jay French – guitars, vocals; Eddie Ojeda – guitars, vocals; Kenny Neill – bass; Mel Anderson – drums	
1975–1976	Jay Jay French – guitars, vocals; Eddie Ojeda – guitars, vocals; Kenny Neill – bass; Kevin John Grace – drums	
1976	Dee Snider – lead vocals; Jay Jay French – guitars, backing vocals; Eddie Ojeda – guitars, backing vocals; Kenny Neill – bass; Kevin John Grace – drums	
1976–1978	Dee Snider – lead vocals; Jay Jay French – guitars, backing vocals; Eddie Ojeda – guitars, backing vocals; Kenny Neill – bass; Tony Petri – drums	
1978–1980	Dee Snider – lead vocals; Jay Jay French – guitars, backing vocals; Eddie Ojeda – guitars, backing vocals; Mark Mendoza – bass, backing vocals; Tony Petri – drums	Under the Blade (1982) – reissue and special edition only; Live at Hammersmith (1994) – two tracks only; Club Daze Volume II: Live in the Bars (2002) – two tracks only; Rock 'n' Roll Saviors - The Early Years - (2016)
1980–1981	Dee Snider – lead vocals; Jay Jay French – guitars, backing vocals; Eddie Ojeda – guitars, backing vocals; Mark Mendoza – bass, backing vocals; Ritchie Teeter – drums	
1981–1982	Dee Snider – lead vocals; Jay Jay French – guitars, backing vocals; Eddie Ojeda – guitars, backing vocals; Mark Mendoza – bass, backing vocals; Joey Brighton – drums	Under the Blade (1982) – special edition only
1982	Dee Snider – lead vocals; Jay Jay French – guitars, backing vocals; Eddie Ojeda – guitars, backing vocals; Mark Mendoza – bass, backing vocals; Walt Woodward III – drums	
1982–1986	Dee Snider – lead vocals; Jay Jay French – guitars, backing vocals; Eddie Ojeda – guitars, backing vocals; Mark Mendoza – bass, backing vocals; A. J. Pero – drums, backing vocals	Under the Blade (1982); You Can't Stop Rock 'n' Roll (1983); Stay Hungry (1984); Come Out and Play (1985); Live at Hammersmith (1994); Rock 'n' Roll Saviors - The Early Years - (2016)
1986–1988	Dee Snider – lead vocals; Jay Jay French – guitars, backing vocals; Eddie Ojeda – guitars, backing vocals; Mark Mendoza – bass, backing vocals; Joey Franco – drums	Love Is for Suckers (1987)
1988	Disbanded	
1988 (Reunion shows)	Dee Snider – lead vocals; Jay Jay French – guitars, backing vocals; Eddie Ojeda – guitars, backing vocals; Mark Mendoza – bass, backing vocals; Joey Franco - drums	
1988–1997	Disbanded	
1997 (Reunion shows)	Dee Snider – lead vocals; Jay Jay French – guitars, backing vocals; Eddie Ojeda – guitars, backing vocals; Mark Mendoza – bass, backing vocals; A. J. Pero – drums, backing vocals	
1997–2001	Disbanded	
2001 (Reunion shows)	Dee Snider – lead vocals; Jay Jay French – guitars, backing vocals; Eddie Ojeda – guitars, backing vocals; Mark Mendoza – bass, backing vocals; A. J. Pero – drums, backing vocals	Club Daze Volume II: Live in the Bars (2002)
2001–2002	Disbanded	
2002 (Reunion shows)	Dee Snider – lead vocals; Jay Jay French – guitars, backing vocals; Eddie Ojeda – guitars, backing vocals; Mark Mendoza – bass, backing vocals; A. J. Pero – drums, backing vocals	
2002–2003	Disbanded	
2003–2015	Dee Snider – lead vocals; Jay Jay French – guitars, backing vocals; Eddie Ojeda – guitars, backing vocals; Mark Mendoza – bass, backing vocals; A. J. Pero – drums, backing vocals	Still Hungry (2004); Live at Wacken: The Reunion (2005); A Twisted Christmas (2006); A Twisted Christmas - Live (2007); Live at the Astoria (2008); Live at the Marquee (2011)
2015–2016	Dee Snider – lead vocals; Jay Jay French – guitars, backing vocals; Eddie Ojeda – guitars, backing vocals; Mark Mendoza – bass, backing vocals; Mike Portnoy – drums, backing vocals	Metal Meltdown (2016)
2016–2023	Disbanded	
2023 (Reunion show)	Dee Snider – lead vocals; Jay Jay French – guitars, backing vocals; Keith Robert War – guitars, backing vocals; Mark Mendoza – bass, backing vocals; Mike Portnoy – drums, backing vocals	
2023–2025	Disbanded	
2025–2026	Dee Snider – lead vocals; Jay Jay French – guitars, backing vocals; Eddie Ojeda – guitars, backing vocals; Russell Pzütto – bass, backing vocals; Joey Franco – drums	
2026–present	Sebastian Bach – lead vocals; Jay Jay French – guitars, backing vocals; Eddie Ojeda – guitars, backing vocals; Russel Pzütto – bass, backing vocals; Joey Cassata – drums	
