= Twisted Sister discography =

- Studio albums: 7
- Extended plays: 2
- Live albums: 9
- Compilation albums: 9
- Singles: 17

This is the discography of American heavy metal band Twisted Sister.

== Albums ==
=== Studio albums ===
Title	Album details	Peak chart positions										Certifications
Title	Album details	US	AUS	CAN	FIN	GER	NOR	NZ	SWE	SWI	UK	Certifications
Under the Blade	Released: September 1982; Label: Secret; Formats: LP, MC	125 (Note: Charted when released in 1985.)	—	68	—	—	—	40	—	—	70	
You Can't Stop Rock 'n' Roll	Released: April 1983; Label: Atlantic, Secret; Formats: LP, MC	130	—	—	—	—	—	—	—	—	14	US: Gold
Stay Hungry	Released: May 10, 1984; Label: Atlantic; Formats: LP, MC	15	21	6	10	48	11	10	3	—	34	AUS: Platinum; CAN: 5× Platinum; NOR: Silver; NZ: Platinum; SWE: Platinum; US: 3× Platinum
Come Out and Play	Released: November 22, 1985; Label: Atlantic; Formats: CD, LP, MC	53	56	36	4	—	11	—	10	—	95	FIN: Gold; SWE: Gold; US: Gold
Love Is for Suckers	Released: July 3, 1987; Label: Atlantic; Formats: CD, LP, MC	74	82	78	16	59	11	—	43	17	67	
Still Hungry	Released: August 24, 2004; Label: Spitfire; Formats: CD, LP; Re-recording of Stay Hungry	—	—	—	—	—	—	—	—	—	—	
A Twisted Christmas	Released: October 17, 2006; Label: Razor & Tie, Demolition; Formats: CD	147	—	—	—	—	—	—	—	—	—	
"—" denotes releases that did not chart or were not released in that territory.

=== Live albums ===
Title	Album details
Live at Hammersmith	Released: October 3, 1994; Label: CMC International, Music for Nations; Formats: 2xLP, 2xMC
Club Daze Volume II: Live in the Bars	Released: September 16, 2002; Label: Spitfire; Formats: CD, MC
Live at Wacken: The Reunion	Released: June 28, 2005; Label: Eagle Vision; Formats: CD, CD+DVD
Live at the Astoria	Released: November 10, 2008; Label: DVE; Formats: CD+DVD
Live at the Marquee	Released: September 19, 2011; Label: Rhino Atlantic; Formats: CD
A Twisted X-Mas: Live in Las Vegas	Released: October 30, 2012; Label: Armoury; Formats: CD
Rock 'n' Roll Saviors -– The Early Years	Released: July 15, 2016; Label: Deadline Music; Formats: 3xCD, digital download
Metal Meltdown – Live from the Hard Rock Casino Las Vegas	Released: July 22, 2016; Label: Loud & Proud; Formats: CD+DVD
Donington	Released: August 12, 2022; Label: Deadline Music; Formats: CD

=== Compilation albums ===
Title	Album details
Big Hits and Nasty Cuts: The Best of Twisted Sister	Released: March 17, 1992; Label: Atlantic; Formats: CD, LP, MC
Club Daze Volume 1: The Studio Sessions	Released: October 1999; Label: Spitfire; Formats: CD, MC
We're Not Gonna Take It & Other Hits	Released: 2001; Label: Flashback; Formats: CD
The Essentials	Released: September 17, 2002; Label: Atlantic; Formats: CD
I Wanna Rock – The Ultimate Twisted Sister Collection	Released: 2005; Label: WEA; Formats: CD
The Best Of...	Released: November 2005; Label: Demolition; Formats: CD
The Best of the Atlantic Years	Released: August 26, 2016; Label: Atlantic; Formats: CD, digital download
Tear It Loose (Studio & Live) – Greatest Hits	Released: January 14, 2022; Label: Friday Music/Atlantic; Formats: 2xLP
Now Playing	Released: March 7, 2025; Label: Rhino/Atlantic; Formats: LP

== EPs ==
Title	EP details
Ruff Cutts	Released: July 23, 1982; Label: Secret; Formats: 12"
Feel Appeal: Love Is for Suckers Extras	Released: April 2, 2021; Label: Warner Music; Formats: digital download

== Singles ==
Title	Year	Peak chart positions										Certifications	Album
Title	Year	US	US Main	AUS	CAN	FIN	IRE	NOR	NZ	SWE	UK	Certifications	Album
"I'll Never Grow Up, Now!" / "Under the Blade"	1979	—	—	—	—	—	—	—	—	—	—		Under the Blade
"Bad Boys (Of Rock n' Roll)"	1980	—	—	—	—	—	—	—	—	—	—		Under the Blade
"I Am (I'm Me)"	1983	—	—	—	—	—	25	—	—	—	18		You Can't Stop Rock 'n' Roll
"The Kids Are Back"	1983	—	—	—	—	—	17	—	—	—	32		You Can't Stop Rock 'n' Roll
"You Can't Stop Rock 'n' Roll"	1983	—	—	—	—	—	25	—	—	—	43		You Can't Stop Rock 'n' Roll
"We're Not Gonna Take It"	1984	21	7	6	6	—	—	—	2	10	58	CAN: 8× Platinum; SWE: Gold; UK: Silver; US: Gold	Stay Hungry
"I Wanna Rock"	1984	68	35	43	44	—	—	5	10	—	93	CAN: 2× Platinum	Stay Hungry
"The Price"	1984	108	19	—	—	—	—	—	—	—	—		Stay Hungry
"Shoot 'Em Down" (promo-only)	1985	—	—	—	—	—	—	—	—	—	—		Under the Blade
"King of Fools"	1985	—	—	—	—	—	—	—	—	—	—		Come Out and Play
"Leader of the Pack"	1985	53	32	80	—	23	—	—	45	—	47		Come Out and Play
"You Want What We Got"	1986	—	—	—	—	—	—	—	—	—	163		Come Out and Play
"Be Chrool to Your Scuel"	1986	—	—	—	—	—	—	—	—	—	—		Come Out and Play
"Hot Love"	1987	—	31	—	—	—	—	—	—	—	—		Love Is for Suckers
"Love Is for Suckers" (promo-only)	1987	—	—	—	—	—	—	—	—	—	—		Love Is for Suckers
"Heroes Are Hard to Find" (promo-only)	1998	—	—	—	—	—	—	—	—	—	—		Strangeland (soundtrack)
"Sin City" (promo-only)	2001	—	—	—	—	—	—	—	—	—	—		Twisted Forever: A Tribute to the Legendary Twisted Sister
"—" denotes releases that did not chart or were not released in that territory.

== Videos ==
=== Video albums ===
- Stay Hungry Tour (1984)
- Come Out and Play (1985)
- Live at Wacken - The Reunion (2004)
- The Video Years (2007)
- A Twisted Christmas Live: A December To Remember (2007)
- Live At The Astoria (2008, recorded in 2004)
- Double Live: Northstage '82 & Ny Steel '01
- Metal Meltdown - Featuring Twisted Sister Live At The Hard Rock Casino - Las Vegas (2016)

=== Music videos ===
Year	Video	Director
1982	"Bad Boys (Of Rock 'N' Roll)"	
1982	"Under the Blade"	
1983	"I Am (I'm Me)"	
1983	"The Kids Are Back"	
1983	"You Can't Stop Rock 'n' Roll"	
1984	"We're Not Gonna Take It"	Marty Callner
1984	"I Wanna Rock"	Marty Callner
1984	"S.M.F."	
1985	"The Price"	
1985	"Leader of the Pack"	
1985	"Be Chrool to Your Scuel"	
1987	"Hot Love"	
2006	"Oh Come All Ye Faithful"	
2006	"Silver Bells"	
2007	"I'll Be Home For Christmas"	
2010	"30"	
