= Live at Wacken: The Reunion =

2005 live album by Twisted Sister

Video by Twisted Sister
- Released: June 28, 2005
- Recorded: August 2, 2003
- Genre: Heavy metal; glam metal
- Length: 105:00
- Label: Eagle Vision; Drakkar (Europe)
- Director: Dave Streicher
- Producer: Twisted Sister, Phil Carson, Jay Jay French, Mark Mendoza

Twisted Sister video chronology
Come Out and Play (1985)	Live at Wacken: The Reunion (2005)	The Video Years (2007)

Live at Wacken: The Reunion

Live album by Twisted Sister
- Released: June 28, 2005
- Recorded: 1980–2003
- Genre: Heavy metal
- Length: 42:49
- Label: Eagle Vision; Drakkar (Europe)
- Producer: Mark Mendoza, Jay Jay French

Twisted Sister chronology
Still Hungry (2004)	Live at Wacken: The Reunion (2005)	A Twisted Christmas (2006)

Professional ratings
Review scores
Source	Rating
Blabbermouth.net	8.5/10
Metal Hammer (GER)	7/7

Live at Wacken - The Reunion is a live album by American heavy metal band Twisted Sister, released on June 28, 2005.

The DVD features in-depth interviews with Dee Snider, Jay Jay French, Mark "Animal" Mendoza, Eddie Ojeda, and A.J. Pero, where the band members discuss the final days of the band in the 1980s, and the rebuilding process required to get Twisted Sister back on stage. The interviews are highlighted by never before seen performance and behind the scenes footage. Interspersed throughout the DVD are live performances from the band's 2003 Wacken Open Air Festival appearance. Concert clips include their most well known songs, including "We're Not Gonna Take It", "I Wanna Rock", "Stay Hungry", "The Price" and more.

The CD side of the DVD continues the reunion story by combining past and present versions Twisted Sister classics. Included are 5 never before released live performances from the early 1980s and 6 live performances from their reunion performance at the 2003 Wacken Open Air festival in Germany.

== Track listings ==
=== DVD ===
1. "Intro - What You Don’t Know (Sure Can’t Hurt You)"
2. "In the Beginning"
3. "The Final Show... 1987" (interviews)
4. "The Kids Are Back"
5. "Stay Hungry"
6. "The Speaks Reunion" (interviews)
7. "A Night for Jason" (interviews)
8. "Destroyer"
9. "Like a Knife in the Back"
10. "VH1 Behind the Music" (interviews)
11. "The New York Steel Benefit" (interviews)
12. "Under the Blade"
13. "Old School Returns" (interviews)
14. "You Can't Stop Rock 'n' Roll"
15. "The Fire Still Burns"
16. "The U.S.O. Tour of South Korea, April 2003" (interviews)
17. "Shoot 'Em Down"
18. "We’re Not Gonna Take It"
19. "Festivals" (interviews)
20. "The Price"
21. "Reflections" (interviews)
22. "Burn in Hell"
23. "I Wanna Rock"
24. "Intro of Band - S.M.F."
25. "Credits"

=== CD ===
Detroit, Portchester, NY, May 1980

1. "Bad Boys of Rock 'n' Roll" - 3:52
2. "Born to Be Wild" - 3:30
3. "I’ll Never Grow Up" - 4:38
4. "You Know I Cry" - 5:33

Marquee, London, UK, December 1982

5. "You Can’t Stop Rock 'n' Roll" - 4:20

Wacken Open Air, Germany, August 2, 2003

6. "What You Don’t Know (Sure Can’t Hurt You)" - 4:45
7. "The Kids Are Back" - 2:55
8. "Stay Hungry" - 3:14
9. "Knife in the Back" - 2:50
10. "I Am, I'm Me" - 3:51
11. "The Fire Still Burns" - 3:21
