= Big Hits and Nasty Cuts =

Big Hits and Nasty Cuts: The Best of Twisted Sister

Compilation album by Twisted Sister
- Released: March 17, 1992
- Recorded: 1979–1984
- Genre: Heavy metal; glam metal
- Length: 69:02
- Label: Atlantic (US); WEA International Inc. (rest of the world)
- Compiler: Jay Jay French, Mark Mendoza

Twisted Sister chronology
Love Is for Suckers (1987)	Big Hits and Nasty Cuts: The Best of Twisted Sister (1992)	Live at Hammersmith (1994)

Big Hits and Nasty Cuts: The Best of Twisted Sister is a greatest hits compilation by American heavy metal band, Twisted Sister. It was released on March 17, 1992 by Atlantic Records for the United States and on March 30 by WEA International Inc. for the rest of the world. The track list consists solely of songs from their first three albums, omitting any material from Come Out and Play and Love Is for Suckers, except outside of the United States where "Bad Boys of Rock 'n' Roll" was replaced with "Be Chrool to Your Scuel" from Come Out and Play.

The album received a Parental Advisory sticker for the live tracks, which contain some profanity.

== Background ==
Twisted Sister frontman Dee Snider was against the release of the compilation, citing it as nothing more than Atlantic Records' attempt to make profit off the band's back catalogue. He told The Morning Call in 1992, "I had no control at all, I told them I didn't want it out. I said, 'Are you getting letters or something? Is there some massive demand for a Twisted Sister package?' I know exactly why they're doing it... to make a few dollars to try and bolster Atlantic's sagging sales. They've had horrendous sales the past few years, so they're releasing everything they have in best ofs. It doesn't cost anything. It's pure profit!"

Guitarist Jay Jay French said that, "to the label's credit", Atlantic asked the band for their involvement; French said they agreed because a compilation helmed solely by Atlantic would be inferior in quality. Bassist Mark Mendoza said the first half of the album is an obvious selection of "what we felt were the most important songs", whereas the live material on the second half "was from a club date in England. Atlantic had owned those tapes for a quite a while, so we just used them."

== Critical reception ==
Professional ratings
Review scores
Source	Rating
AllMusic	4.5/5 stars
Collector's Guide to Heavy Metal	5/10
Select	2/5 stars

While highlighting Big Hits and Nasty Cuts for containing Twisted Sister's only British hit, "I Am (I'm Me)", reviewer Marilla Blellock of Select opined that the band "made rock 'n' roll for the young school rebel" and "wrote big dumb songs which sneered at parents, growing up, and rules – and they were loud, boisterous and empty." In 1992, Howard Cohen of The Miami Herald included it at number 16 in his list of 25 landmark heavy metal albums. Cohen noted how the live tracks, including the "incredibly rude" Rolling Stones cover "in which Snider manages to out-obnoxious Ted Nugent", "should continue to clear a room of unwanted pests. Or enliven a party, whatever the case may be."

Retrospectively, Stephen Thomas Erlewine of AllMusic believed the five live tracks "are of questionable quality", adding that they were included to entice "hardcore Sister collectors", but praised the overall album for remaining "an excellent summation of the group's career."

== Release history ==
Region	Date	Edition(s)	Format(s)	Label(s)	Ref.
North America	March 17, 1992	Standard	CD; cassette	Atlantic	
Europe	March 30, 1992	Standard	CD; cassette; LP	WEA	
Japan	April 25, 1992	Standard	CD	Atlantic	
Europe	November 8, 1993	Reissue	CD; cassette	WEA	

== Track listing ==
1. "We're Not Gonna Take It" - 3:39
2. "I Wanna Rock" - 3:03
3. "I Am (I'm Me)" - 3:35
4. "The Price" - 3:49
5. "You Can't Stop Rock 'n' Roll" - 4:42
6. "The Kids Are Back" - 3:17
7. "Shoot 'Em Down" - 3:54
8. "Under the Blade" - 4:40
9. "I'll Never Grow Up, Now!" - 4:08
10. "Bad Boys (Of Rock 'n' Roll)" - 3:19
11. "What You Don't Know (Sure Can Hurt You)" (live) - 5:09 (Live at the Marquee Club, London, UK - March 5th 1983)
12. "Destroyer" (live) - 4:37 (Live at the Marquee Club, London, UK - March 5th 1983)
13. "Tear It Loose" (live) - 3:05 (Live at the Marquee Club, London, UK - March 5th 1983)
14. "Run for Your Life" (live) - 3:38 (US version only) (Live at the Marquee Club, London, UK - March 5th 1983)
15. "It's Only Rock 'n' Roll" (live) - 10:12 (Live at the Marquee Club, London, UK - March 5th 1983)
16. "Let the Good Times Roll" / "Feel So Fine" (live) - 4:15 (Live at the Marquee Club, London, UK - March 5th 1983)

== Credits ==
=== Twisted Sister ===
- Dee Snider - lead vocals
- Eddie "Fingers" Ojeda - lead & rhythm guitars
- Jay Jay French - rhythm & lead guitars
- Mark "The Animal" Mendoza - bass
- A. J. Pero - drums
