= The Essentials (Twisted Sister album) =

Compilation album by Twisted Sister
- Released: September 17, 2002
- Genre: Heavy metal; glam metal
- Length: 46:36
- Label: Warner Music Group

Twisted Sister chronology
Club Daze Volume II: Live in the Bars (2001)	The Essentials (2002)	Still Hungry (2004)

Professional ratings
Review scores
Source	Rating
AllMusic	4/5 stars

The Essentials is a compilation album by American heavy metal band Twisted Sister, released in 2002.

== Track listing ==
1. "We're Not Gonna Take It" - 3:44
2. "I Wanna Rock" - 3:06
3. "Leader of the Pack" - 3:44
4. "You Can't Stop Rock 'n' Roll" - 4:40
5. "Stay Hungry" - 3:03
6. "Under the Blade" - 4:39
7. "Come Out and Play" - 4:55
8. "Love Is for Suckers" - 3:25
9. "I Believe in Rock 'n' Roll" - 4:03
10. "The Kids Are Back" - 3:16
11. "I'll Never Grow Up, Now!" - 4:09
12. "Shoot 'Em Down" - 3:52

== Credits ==
=== Twisted Sister ===
- Dee Snider - lead vocals
- Eddie "Fingers" Ojeda - lead & rhythm guitars
- Jay Jay French - rhythm & lead guitars
- Mark "The Animal" Mendoza - bass
- A. J. Pero - drums
- Joey "Seven" Franco - drums on "Love Is for Suckers"
