= Live at Hammersmith (Twisted Sister album) =

Live album by Twisted Sister
- Released: October 3, 1994
- Recorded: June 15, 1984
- Venue: Hammersmith Odeon (London)
- Genre: Heavy metal; glam metal
- Length: 69:01
- Label: Music for Nations (UK); CMC International (North America); SPV/Steamhammer (Europe)
- Producer: Mark Mendoza, Jay Jay French

Twisted Sister chronology
Big Hits and Nasty Cuts: The Best of Twisted Sister (1992)	Live at Hammersmith (1994)	Club Daze Volume 1: The Studio Sessions (1999)

Professional ratings
Review scores
Source	Rating
AllMusic	2.5/5 stars
Collector's Guide to Heavy Metal	7/10

Live at Hammersmith is a live album by American heavy metal band Twisted Sister, released on October 3, 1994. It was recorded on June 15, 1984, at the Hammersmith Odeon in London, England.

== Track listing ==
All songs written by Dee Snider except where noted.

CD 1

1. "What You Don't Know (Sure Can Hurt You)" – 4:43
2. "The Kids Are Back" – 2:49
3. "Stay Hungry" – 5:09
4. "Destroyer" – 4:10
5. "We're Not Gonna Take It" – 3:17
6. "You Can't Stop Rock 'n' Roll" – 7:23
7. "Like a Knife in the Back" – 2:47
8. "Shoot 'em Down" – 3:19
9. "Under the Blade" – 4:35

CD 2

1. "Burn in Hell" – 5:49
2. "I Am (I'm Me)" – 5:25
3. "I Wanna Rock" – 13:05
4. "S.M.F." – 7:27
5. "We're Gonna Make It" 4:20
6. "Jailhouse Rock" (Jerry Leiber, Mike Stoller) (live at Detroit, Port Chester, New York, 1979) – 3:17
7. "Train Kept a-Rollin'" (Tiny Bradshaw) (live at Detroit, Port Chester, New York, 1979) – 10:06

== Credits ==
=== Twisted Sister ===
- Dee Snider – lead vocals
- Eddie "Fingers" Ojeda – lead & rhythm guitars
- Jay Jay French – rhythm & lead guitars, backing vocals, executive producer
- Mark "The Animal" Mendoza – bass, backing vocals, producer, mixing
- A. J. Pero – drums, percussion
- Tony Petri – drums on "Jailhouse Rock" and "Train Kept a Rollin'"

=== Production ===
- Charlie Barreca – live sound mixing
- Denny McNerney – engineer, mixing

== Charts ==
Chart (1994)	Peak position
UK Rock & Metal Albums (OCC)	35
