= Love Is for Suckers =

Studio album by Twisted Sister
- Released: July 3, 1987
- Studio: Atlantic (New York City)
- Genres: Heavy metal; pop metal
- Length: 38:07
- Label: Atlantic
- Producer: Beau Hill

Twisted Sister chronology
Come Out and Play (1985)	Love Is for Suckers (1987)	Big Hits and Nasty Cuts (1992)

Singles from Love Is for Suckers
- 1. "Hot Love" Released: June 26, 1987

Love Is for Suckers is the fifth studio album by the American heavy metal band Twisted Sister. It was released by Atlantic Records on July 3, 1987. It was the band's last album before their breakup and subsequent reunion and release of Still Hungry in 2004. It is also their last album to be composed of entirely new, original material.

== Overview ==
The sound of the album was strongly influenced by glam metal, and was one of the causes of conflict which led to the band splitting after its release. The band got rid of the more extreme elements of their look, to "fit in with every other hair metal band out there at that time". According to interviews contained in the Live at Wacken DVD and in Snider's autobiography, the material was originally meant to be a solo album by Twisted Sister's lead singer, Dee Snider, but the label pushed for it to be released under the Twisted Sister name instead. The tour for the album lasted just over one month and ended in Minneapolis, Minnesota on October 10, 1987. Two days later, on October 12, 1987, vocalist Dee Snider announced his departure from the band.

All the classic-era band members took part in recording sessions for the album, except drummer A. J. Pero, who left the band in July 1986 and was replaced by Joey Franco. According to the album's producer Beau Hill, guitarist Reb Beach played almost all of the guitars on the album. Hill had Beach, Ojeda and French all play the lead, rhythm and solo guitar parts of a song and he would then select the best performances. Although he wanted to use Twisted Sister's two guitarists where possible, Hill found that Beach, being "such an incredible guitar player", often provided the "strongest and most compelling performance".

No songs from this album appeared on the band's 1992 greatest hits album Big Hits and Nasty Cuts. It would be Twisted Sister's final studio album of original material, as all albums since have been compilations, live albums or re-recordings of already written material.

Seven of the album's songs were played live during the brief 1987 tour. Snider has stated that he likes many of the songs on the album, vocally. However he feels that if they play any of them live, it may bring back bad memories for the band. In 2012, the band introduced "Wake Up (The Sleeping Giant)" into their set, following demands from fans for material to be included from all of the band's studio albums.

In a 1987 interview with Record Mirror, Snider stated, "We haven't done many love songs before. Most of our songs have been about rebellion, but on Love Is for Suckers the songs are mainly about love, lust and sex. It's a very horny album. I get pretty excited every time I hear it." At the time, Snider considered the album to be "more to our roots than previous records have been". He said, "I realised that the original concept for Twisted Sister was to be half heavy metal and half glam/glitter rock. As the years went on, we left the glitter/glam music behind and became more and more just heavy metal. So I went back listening to my early influences – Alice Cooper, T. Rex, Slade and others – to get the band back to its roots."

In a 2009 interview by Ruben Mosqueda, Snider spoke of his thoughts on the album:

"There's some great stuff on there man! The thing is, that was supposed to be my first solo album. The thing was the record company and management pressured me into making it a Twisted Sister record. There's some stuff that was in the Twisted Sister vein but it was supposed to be a solo record, that album was meant to give the band the break we needed. I felt that by releasing a solo album I could put that out there, get it out my system, and then after a short break we could regroup and work on a new album. The recording, the promotion and touring of Love Is for Suckers went on to kill the band. Management and the record company in their infinite wisdom know best. Oh let's put five guys who can't stand each other in a studio for three months!"

In 2012, Dee Snider commented to an audience at the annual concert festival in Dessel Belgium, known as the Graspop Metal Meeting, "Now we have been accused in the past of not playing stuff from all of our albums, so this year we added one song from the Love Is for Suckers record to the set [...] for those who know in the 80s, there was a little problem in Washington with censorship and this one was a big middle finger to Washington D.C. It's called "Wake Up (the Sleeping Giant)."" The band then performed that song.

== Critical reception ==
Professional ratings
Review scores
Source	Rating
AllMusic	2/5 stars
Collector's Guide to Heavy Metal	4/10
Los Angeles Times	3/5 stars
The Record	1/4 stars

Upon its release, Billboard wrote: "Longtime New York-based rockers stumbled with last release but have managed to catch their balance on this one, with a new producer and new attitude. Album is chock-full of sturdy, straightforward cuts." Sharon Liveten of the Los Angeles Times wrote: "On its fifth album, Twisted Sister doesn't tromp off into uncharted territory. It's anthemic, occasionally repetitive and self-derivative. That said, Love Is for Suckers is a darned good album. The guitar work is flashy but doesn't resort to clichéd posturing and Dee Snider's vocals are in fine, sneering form."

Robin Welles of The Press-Courier described Love Is for Suckers as "a screamer of an album". Pete Bishop of the Pittsburgh Press commented: "This is cliche-cluttered, "commercial" heavy metal designed for instant acceptance. Seven of the cuts are the same wham-bam-party-hearty stuff Twisted Sister and so many others have defrosted and reheated ad nauseam." He selected "Hot Love", "One Bad Habit" and "You Are All That I Need" as "the class of the disc because they dare to differ from the formula and because Twisted Sister performs them well."

Michael Dowding of The Boston Globe wrote: "Unfortunately, this album sounds like a band in decline. There's still enough thump and screech to keep the Saturday night party going, but don't look for any development or innovation. For fans, the best cuts include "Wake Up" and "One Bad Habit". For many other listeners, though, this is an album to avoid." Barbara Jaeger of The Record wrote: "The 10 songs on this collection sound like every other song the band has done. Underscoring the overwrought vocals of Dee Snider are screechy guitars and thunderous drums. The songs, with their sophomoric lyrics, cover the usual heavy-metal topics. So, if you're looking for something new, forget about this one." Keith Carman from Exclaim!, gave the album a highly negative review, stating, "This isn't even for suckers; it just sucks."

== Track listing ==
All tracks are written by Dee Snider, except where noted.

Side one
No.	Title	Writer(s)	Length
1.	"Wake Up (The Sleeping Giant)"		4:19
2.	"Hot Love"		3:28
3.	"Love Is for Suckers" (Poison Dollys cover)	Marky Carter, Dee Snider	3:25
4.	"I'm So Hot for You"		4:05
5.	"Tonight"		3:51

Side two
No.	Title	Writer(s)	Length
6.	"Me and the Boys"		3:52
7.	"One Bad Habit"		3:18
8.	"I Want This Night (To Last Forever)"	Mark Tanner, Marty Wagner, Dee Snider	4:18
9.	"You Are All That I Need"		4:17
10.	"Yeah Right"		3:14

1999 Spitfire Records reissue bonus tracks
No.	Title	Length
11.	"Feel Appeal"	3:19
12.	"Statutory Date"	3:11
13.	"If That's What You Want"	4:25
14.	"I Will Win"	3:29

Note: the reissue bonus tracks were later released as a separate EP in 2021 titled: Feel Appeal: Love Is for Suckers Extras.

== Personnel ==
=== Twisted Sister ===
- Dee Snider – lead vocals
- Eddie "Fingers" Ojeda – lead & rhythm guitar, backing vocals
- Jay Jay French – rhythm & lead guitar, backing vocals
- Mark "The Animal" Mendoza – bass, backing vocals
- Joey "Seven" Franco – drums, percussion, backing vocals

=== Additional musicians ===
- Reb Beach – additional guitars, additional shouts
- Beau Hill – keyboards, backing vocals
- The New West Horns – horns
- Jimmy Chalfant, Steve Whiteman, Kip Winger – backing vocals
- Bob Gamm, Gary Kris, B. Smith, Chris Cintron, Joe Gerber, Jodie Segall, Peter Love, Luke Perry – additional shouts

=== Production ===
- Beau Hill – producer, engineer
- Twisted Sister, Beau Hill, Reb Beach, Ronni Le Tekrø – arrangements
- Stephen Benben – engineer
- Ira McLaughlin – assistant engineer
- Ted Jensen – mastering at Sterling Sound, New York
- Bob Defrin – art direction
- Frank Moscati – photography
- Dee Snider – cover concept

== Charts ==
Chart (1987)	Peak position
Australian Albums (Kent Music Report)	82
Canada Top Albums/CDs (RPM)	78
Finnish Albums (The Official Finnish Charts)	16
German Albums (Offizielle Top 100)	59
Norwegian Albums (VG-lista)	11
Swedish Albums (Sverigetopplistan)	43
Swiss Albums (Schweizer Hitparade)	17
UK Albums (Official Charts)	57
US Billboard 200	74
US Cash Box Top 100 Albums	60
US AOR Albums (Radio & Records)	40
