= A Twisted Christmas =

Studio album by Twisted Sister
- Released: October 17, 2006
- Recorded: June–August 2006
- Studios: Audio Magick, West Babylon, New York
- Genres: Christmas; heavy metal; glam metal
- Length: 41:50
- Label: Razor & Tie
- Producers: Mark Mendoza, Jay Jay French

Twisted Sister chronology
Live at Wacken: The Reunion (2005)	A Twisted Christmas (2006)	Live at The Astoria (2008)

A Twisted Christmas is the seventh studio album by American heavy metal band Twisted Sister, released on October 17, 2006. The album features classic Christmas songs, performed as heavy metal and glam metal versions, often featuring lyrical changes.

The holiday carol "Oh Come All Ye Faithful", which heavily inspired the band's popular song "We're Not Gonna Take It", is recorded in a style exactly like the Twisted Sister hit. The group's take on the carol has become one of their best-known songs since their 1980s heyday, with Twisted Sister creating a comedic music video involving the band members crashing a holiday celebration in a bickering couple's home.

== Premise and inspiration ==
Although not properly a concept album, the album begins with a version of "Have Yourself a Merry Little Christmas" done in the style of traditional pop music that's interrupted by a bit of banter by the group's members. Things then segue into the band's standard heavy metal style, though incorporating festive elements such as the tolling sounds of bells. Track "Heavy Metal Christmas (The Twelve Days of Christmas)", including a section known as "We Wish You a Twisted Christmas", closes out the album in a burst of clapping and cheers.

"Oh Come All Ye Faithful" closely follows what the band did with their hit "We're Not Gonna Take It". Significant elements of their popular song took inspiration from the carol. The song was performed on The Tonight Show with Jay Leno on December 13, 2006.

Parts of the guitar riff to "White Christmas" seem to be based on "I Wanna Rock", another Twisted Sister song, while its ending sounds similar to that of "S.M.F.", both were other Twisted Sister songs which also appeared on their 1984 Stay Hungry album. Parts of the guitar riff on "Silver Bells" is based on "Problem Child" by AC/DC. Some of the guitar riffs on "Let It Snow" are based on Black Sabbath's "Children of the Grave," although the intro sounds rather similar to "Rock and Roll Saviors" which was a song the band had during their club days. Some of the guitar riffs from "Deck the Halls" are based on "The Boys Are Back in Town" by Thin Lizzy. Also, the guitar riffs on the song "I Saw Mommy Kissing Santa Claus" are based on "You've Got Another Thing Comin'" by Judas Priest.

Metal star Ozzy Osbourne's influence on the group and its music is name-checked in closing number "Heavy Metal Christmas (The Twelve Days of Christmas)": with the promised gifts being "twelve silver crosses, eleven black mascaras, ten pairs of platforms, nine tattered t-shirts, eight pentagrams, seven leather jackets, six cans of hairspray, five skull earrings, four quarts of Jack, three studded belts, two pairs of spandex pants, and a tattoo of Ozzy".

== Recording and release ==
The album was recorded from June to August 2006. The band produced the release themselves.

Two music videos were made for "Oh Come All Ye Faithful". The first one follows the same style of the band's landmark videos "We're Not Gonna Take It" and "I Wanna Rock", as a married couple celebrate Christmas when the wife discovers that her husband's gift to her is a CD copy of A Twisted Christmas. She then starts to rant about the present until Snider and the band appear behind her. Her lines then are a nod to the video of "We're Not Gonna Take It" where a father scolds his son with the exact same words.

The second video version used the radio edit of the track. It is a short, animated feature with the band taking over Santa's workshop and using his sleigh to drop off Twisted Sister merchandise and cans of hairspray to children.

The music video for "Silver Bells" is the sequel to the first "Oh Come All Ye Faithful" video, as the couple are paid a visit by numerous guests while the band performs live on television. The couple's new baby's head is replaced by the faces of various band members singing.

Twisted Sister also filmed a studio performance of "Heavy Metal Christmas" for GameTap. Unusually, this video featured frontman Snider without his makeup.

The album has been reissued by Rhino Entertainment to streaming services in 2020, due to the Razor & Tie label shuttered back in 2018.

The bonus track version have White Christmas featuring Doro Pesch instead of not.

== Reception ==
Professional ratings
Review scores
Source	Rating
AllMusic	3.5/5 stars
Entertainment Weekly	D+
Metal Hammer (GER)	2/7

Music critic James C. Monger praised the release for the publication AllMusic. Monger remarked that the band's members "filter the beloved Christmas carol" tradition "through the same makeup-smeared sieve" that brought them earlier success. Arguing that Christmas albums "need to either be pretty good, horrifically terrible, or completely original to cause even the jolliest head to turn", he wrote that Twisted Christmas "manages to achieve all three" and constitutes a "collection of yuletide classics".

== Track listing ==
No.	Title	Writer(s)	Length
1.	"Have Yourself a Merry Little Christmas"	Hugh Martin, Ralph Blane	4:48
2.	"Oh Come All Ye Faithful"	Traditional	4:40
3.	"White Christmas"	Irving Berlin	3:56
4.	"I'll Be Home for Christmas"	Walter Kent, Buck Ram, Kim Gannon	4:08
5.	"Silver Bells"	Jay Livingston, Ray Evans	5:05
6.	"I Saw Mommy Kissing Santa Claus"	Tommie Connor	3:39
7.	"Let It Snow, Let It Snow, Let It Snow"	Jule Styne, Sammy Cahn	3:09
8.	"Deck the Halls"	Traditional	2:52
9.	"The Christmas Song (Chestnuts Roasting on an Open Fire)"	Robert Wells, Mel Tormé	3:40
10.	"Heavy Metal Christmas (The Twelve Days of Christmas)"	Traditional, lyrics by Twisted Sister	5:14
11.	"We Wish You a Twisted Christmas" (hidden track)	Traditional	0:36

Bonus track
No.	Title	Writer(s)	Length
1.	"White Christmas (Eddie Ojeda vocals version)"	Irving Berlin	4:02

== Personnel ==
=== Twisted Sister ===
- Dee Snider – lead vocals
- Jay Jay French – guitars, backing vocals
- Eddie "Fingers" Ojeda – guitars, backing vocals
- Mark "The Animal" Mendoza – bass, backing vocals
- A. J. Pero – drums, backing vocals

=== Additional musicians ===
- Lita Ford – co-lead vocals on "I'll Be Home for Christmas"
- Doro Pesch – backing vocals on "White Christmas"
- Brian Bunce – Trumpet on “Have Yourself a Merry little Christmas”

=== Production ===
- Jay Jay French – executive producer
- Mark "The Animal" Mendoza – producer, mixing, mastering
- Denny McNerney – engineer, mixing, mastering
- George Marshall – assistant engineer
- David Wong – assistant engineer

== Charts ==
Chart (2006)	Peak position
US Billboard 200	147
US Top Holiday Albums (Billboard)	27

== See also ==
- 2006 in music
- Christmas music
- Twisted Sister discography
