= Club Daze Volume II: Live in the Bars =

Live album by Twisted Sister
- Released: September 16, 2002
- Recorded: 1979, 1980, 2001
- Studio: Pie Studios, Glen Cove, New York (new studio tracks)
- Genre: Heavy metal; glam metal
- Length: 54:13
- Label: Spitfire
- Producer: Jay Jay French, Mark Mendoza

Twisted Sister chronology
Club Daze Volume 1: The Studio Sessions (1999)	Club Daze Volume II: Live in the Bars (2002)	The Essentials (2002)

Professional ratings
Review scores
Source	Rating
AllMusic	2.5/5 stars

Club Daze Volume II: Live in the Bars is a live album by the American heavy metal band Twisted Sister, released in 2002. The album contains live performances recorded for radio shows in 1979–1980 and two previously unreleased studio tracks. The studio tracks were written and demoed during the recording sessions for Stay Hungry (1984) and completed by the classic line-up in 2001.

== Track listing ==
No.	Title	Writer(s)	Origin	Length
1.	"Never Say Never"	Dee Snider	2001 studio recording	2:20
2.	"Blastin' Fast & Loud"	Snider	2001 studio recording	3:01
3.	"Follow Me"	Jay Jay French	Unbroadcasted radio show on Halloween 1979	3:30
4.	"Under the Blade"	Snider	Unbroadcasted radio show on Halloween 1979	5:02
5.	"Lady's Boy"	Snider	Unbroadcasted radio show on Halloween 1979	5:10
6.	"Come Back"	Snider	Unbroadcasted radio show on Halloween 1979	6:55
7.	"Can't Stand Still"	French	Unbroadcasted radio show on Halloween 1979	4:49
8.	"Honey, Look Three Times"	Snider	Unbroadcasted radio show on Halloween 1979	4:12
9.	"You Know I Cry"	Snider	Unbroadcasted radio show on Halloween 1979	5:52
10.	"Without You"	Snider	Radio sessions for WLIR & WBAB	2:28
11.	"Plastic Money"	Snider	Radio sessions for WLIR & WBAB	4:10
12.	"Long Tall Sally"	Enotris Johnson, Robert Blackwell, Richard Penniman	Radio sessions for WLIR & WBAB	2:25
13.	"Johnny B. Goode"	Chuck Berry	Radio sessions for WLIR & WBAB	4:20

- Tracks 10–13: From off the air, first generation cassette copies.

== Personnel ==
=== Twisted Sister ===
- Dee Snider – lead vocals
- Jay Jay French – guitars, backing vocals, lead vocals on "Can't Stand Still", producer
- Eddie Ojeda – guitars, backing vocals
- Mark Mendoza – bass, backing vocals, producer, engineer, mixing
- Tony Petri – drums, percussion
- A. J. Pero – drums on tracks 1 and 2

=== Production ===
- Denny McNearney – studio tracks engineer, mixing, digital mastering
