= You Can't Stop Rock 'n' Roll =

Studio album by Twisted Sister
- Released: April 1983
- Recorded: Early 1983
- Studio: Sol (Cookham)
- Genre: Heavy metal
- Length: 37:53
- Label: Atlantic
- Producer: Stuart Epps

Twisted Sister chronology
Under the Blade (1982)	You Can't Stop Rock 'n' Roll (1983)	Stay Hungry (1984)

Singles from You Can't Stop Rock 'n' Roll
- 1. "I Am (I'm Me)" Released: March 1983; 2. "The Kids Are Back" Released: May 1983; 3. "You Can't Stop Rock 'n' Roll" Released: August 1983

Professional ratings
Review scores
Source	Rating
AllMusic	4/5 stars
Collector's Guide to Heavy Metal	8/10
Kerrang!	(very favorable)

You Can't Stop Rock 'n' Roll is the second studio album by American heavy metal band Twisted Sister, released in April 1983 in the UK and on June 27, 1983 in the US.

The songs "I Am (I'm Me)", "The Kids Are Back" and the album's title track were released as singles. The album was certified as a Gold Album by RIAA in November 1995, for selling over 500,000 copies in the USA. Metal-rules.com put the album in their list of "The Top 100 Heavy Metal Albums" and on their list of "The Top 50 Glam Metal Albums".

The title track is a new recording of the track "Can't Stop Rock and Roll" which appeared on the compilation "Son of Homegrown" in 1982.

== Track listing ==
All tracks are written by Dee Snider.

Side one
No.	Title	Length
1.	"The Kids Are Back"	3:16
2.	"Like a Knife in the Back"	3:03
3.	"Ride to Live, Live to Ride"	4:04
4.	"I Am (I'm Me)"	3:34
5.	"The Power and the Glory"	4:20

Side two
No.	Title	Length
6.	"We're Gonna Make It"	3:44
7.	"I've Had Enough"	4:02
8.	"I'll Take You Alive"	3:08
9.	"You're Not Alone (Suzette's Song)"	4:02
10.	"You Can't Stop Rock 'n' Roll"	4:40

Re-release bonus tracks
No.	Title	Length
11.	"One Man Woman"	3:09
12.	"Four Barrel Heart of Love"	3:04
13.	"Feel the Power"	3:12

== Personnel ==
=== Twisted Sister ===
- Dee Snider – lead and backing vocals
- Jay Jay French – guitar, backing vocals
- Eddie "Fingers" Ojeda – guitar, backing vocals
- Mark "The Animal" Mendoza – bass, backing vocals, studio assistant
- A. J. Pero – drums, backing vocals

=== Production ===
- Stuart Epps – producer, engineer, mixing

== Charts ==
Chart (1983)	Peak position
UK Albums (OCC)	14
US Billboard 200	130

== Certifications ==
Region	Certification	Certified units/sales
United States (RIAA)	Gold	500,000^{^}
^{^} Shipments figures based on certification alone.

== In popular culture ==
- In series two of Brainiac: Science Abuse, the song "You Can't Stop Rock 'n' Roll" was used in a recurring experiment to show what things could be used to "stop rock 'n' roll". The experiment would consist of a stereo playing the song being destroyed in an overly extreme fashion using various chemicals, objects and explosives to which the presenter would then humorously declare that you can in fact "stop rock 'n' roll" with said method.
- In the 2010 film Jackass 3D, "The Kids Are Back" is played during the opening credits.
