= You Can't Stop Rock 'n' Roll (song) =

1983 song by Twisted Sister

Single by Twisted Sister

from the album You Can't Stop Rock 'n' Roll
- B-side: "Let The Good Times Roll"/"Feel So Fine"
- Released: August 12, 1983
- Genre: Heavy metal
- Length: 4:41 (album version); 3:55 (edit)
- Label: Atlantic
- Songwriter: Dee Snider
- Producer: Stuart Epps

Twisted Sister singles chronology
"The Kids Are Back" (1983)	"You Can't Stop Rock 'n' Roll" (1983)	"We're Not Gonna Take It" (1984)

"You Can't Stop Rock 'n' Roll" is a song by American heavy metal band Twisted Sister, released on August 12, 1983 as the third and final single from their album of the same name. The song was written by Dee Snider and produced by Stuart Epps. "You Can't Stop Rock 'n' Roll" reached number 43 in the UK Singles Chart and remained in the top 75 for four weeks.

== Background ==
Snider wrote "You Can't Stop Rock 'n' Roll" in 1981 and it was originally recorded for the band's debut album, Under the Blade, in 1982. The album was originally going to be named after the song, but Martin Hooker, the head of the band's label, Secret Records, ultimately decided against the name and convinced the band to change it. "You Can't Stop Rock 'n' Roll" was also removed from the album, but was re-recorded and included on the band's second studio album in 1983, which was given the same name. In 2023, Snider picked it as his favorite Twisted Sister song and stated, "Between the message, the metallic sound and the anthemic nature of the song, it best captures all that Twisted Sister was."

== Music video ==
The song's music video was directed by Arthur Ellis for Limelight Films and he also came up with the plot idea. Snider recalled in his 2012 autobiography Shut Up and Give Me the Mic: A Twisted Memoir, "[The] story line [was] about the Taste Squad, an organization whose sole purpose was to monitor and track the activities of Twisted Sister. Ultimately, the band's nemesis would be 'converted' to heavy metal and the ways of the band. With no idea as to what constituted a 'rock video', we ran with Arthur's idea. He seemed to get our overall attitude. The video showed us both with and without makeup, which we liked, and it had a sense of humor."

== Critical reception ==
Upon its release as a single, Dave Dickson of Kerrang! noted "You Can't Stop Rock 'n' Roll" "doesn't possess quite the same 'SingalongaDee' appeal" of "I Am (I'm Me)", but added it was "a marvellous ditty nonetheless, with some furious fret-burning courtesy of Jay Jay". Allan McQuillan of the Western Daily Press described it as "simple, honest heavy raucous rock" and added, "You can't stop Dee Snider and the boys bashing your ears in a frenzy of heavy rock excitement." Peter Trollope of the Liverpool Echo wrote, "Makes Ritchie's boys look like wimps. Meat 'n' muscle with Dee Snider in full swing!"

Eleanor Levy of Record Mirror considered it "more of the same" from Twisted Sister and added, "Listen to it with a straight face if you can." Lynn Hanna of Number One stated, "Unfortunately this isn't inspired, even by Twisted Sister's standards. This guitar break sounds like someone's stepped on the cat. Heavy as lead."

== Track listing ==
7–inch single (UK)

1. "You Can't Stop Rock 'n' Roll" – 4:41
2. "Let The Good Times Roll"/"Feel So Fine" (Recorded live at the Marquee) – 4:16

7–inch single (Australia)

1. "You Can't Stop Rock 'n' Roll" – 4:41
2. "Ride to Live, Live to Ride" – 4:04

12–inch single (UK)

1. "You Can't Stop Rock 'n' Roll" – 4:41
2. "Feel the Power" – 3:15
3. "Four Barrel Heart of Love" – 3:05
4. "One Man Woman" – 3:11

12–inch promotional single #1 (US)

1. "You Can't Stop Rock 'n' Roll" – 4:53
2. "You Can't Stop Rock 'n' Roll" – 4:53

12–inch promotional single #2 (US)

1. "You Can't Stop Rock 'n' Roll" (Edited Version) – 3:55
2. "The Kids Are Back" – 3:16

== Personnel ==
Twisted Sister

- Dee Snider – lead vocals, backing vocals
- Jay Jay French – guitars, backing vocals
- Eddie "Fingers" Ojeda – guitars, backing vocals
- Mark "The Animal" Mendoza – bass, backing vocals
- A. J. Pero – drums, backing vocals

Production

- Stuart Epps – production (all tracks), engineering (all studio tracks), mixing (all tracks)
- Mark "The Animal" Mendoza – studio assistance (all tracks)
- Charles Barreca – live sound engineering ("Let the Good Times Roll"/"Feel So Fine")
- Phil Harding – engineering ("Let the Good Times Roll"/"Feel So Fine")

Other

- Ray Palmer – photography (band photo)

== Charts ==
Chart (1983)	Peak position
Ireland (IRMA)	25
UK Singles (Official Charts)	43
UK Heavy Metal Singles (MRIB)	4
