= Hot Love =

Hot Love may refer to:

- "Hot Love" (T. Rex song)
- "Hot Love" (Five Star song)
- "Hot Love" (Twisted Sister song)
- "Hot Love", a song by Cheap Trick
- Hot Love, a film by German director Jörg Buttgereit
