= Club Daze Volume 1: The Studio Sessions =

Compilation album by Twisted Sister
- Released: 1999
- Recorded: 1978–1981
- Genre: Heavy metal; glam metal
- Length: 55:12
- Label: Spitfire
- Producer: Jay Jay French, Mark Mendoza

Twisted Sister chronology
Live at Hammersmith (1994)	Club Daze Volume 1: The Studio Sessions (1999)	Club Daze Volume II: Live in the Bars (2001)

Professional ratings
Review scores
Source	Rating
AllMusic	4/5 stars
Collector's Guide to Heavy Metal	5/10

Club Daze Volume 1: The Studio Sessions is a compilation album of Twisted Sister's early studio recordings from music tracks dating back to 1978 to 1981. It was released in 1999 and re-issued in 2001.

== Track listing ==
All songs written by Dee Snider, unless otherwise noted

1. "Come Back" - 6:30
2. "Pay the Price" - 4:28
3. "Rock 'n' Roll Saviors" - 4:37
4. "High Steppin'" - 2:45
5. "Big Gun" - 4:02
6. "T.V. Wife" (Jay Jay French) - 4:01
7. "Can't Stand Still" (French) - 3:45
8. "Follow Me" (French) - 3:52
9. "Lady's Boy" - 4:20
10. "I'll Never Grow Up, Now" - 4:11
11. "Leader of the Pack" (Ellie Greenwich, Shadow Morton, Jeff Barry) - 3:54
12. "Under the Blade" - 4:29
13. "Shoot 'Em Down" - 3:43

Tracks 1–8 are studio recordings from 1978, tracks 9–12 from 1979, track 13 from 1981

=== Additional track information ===
- "Come Back" and "Rock 'n' Roll Saviors" were re-recorded and re-released on Still Hungry in 2004.
- "Lady's Boy" was originally released on the single Bad Boys (of Rock 'n' Roll) in 1980.
- "I'll Never Grow Up, Now" was originally released edited on the single I'll Never Grow Up, Now in 1979, although the version here is the version from "Steel Crazy compilation 1982 and about 15 seconds longer than original single version.
- These versions of "Leader of the Pack", "Under the Blade" and "Shoot 'Em Down" were originally released on the EP Ruff Cuts in 1982, "Under the Blade" and "Shoot 'Em Down" are recorded with incorrect speed ( direct 7 inch rip) so they are about ten seconds shorter than the versions on Ruff Cuts.

== Personnel ==
- Dee Snider - vocals
- Jay Jay French - guitars, backing vocals
- Eddie Ojeda - guitars, backing vocals
- Kenneth Harrison Neill - bass on tracks 1–8
- Mark Mendoza - bass on tracks 9–13
- Tony Petri - drums on tracks 1–12
- Joey Brighton - drums on track 13
- Denny McNearney - digital mastering
