= I Am (I'm Me) =

1983 song by Twisted Sister

Single by Twisted Sister

from the album You Can't Stop Rock 'n' Roll
- Released: March 1983
- Genre: Heavy metal; glam metal
- Length: 3:36
- Label: Atlantic
- Songwriter(s): Dee Snider
- Producer(s): Stuart Epps

Twisted Sister singles chronology
"Bad Boys (Of Rock N' Roll)" (1980)	"I Am (I'm Me)" (1983)	"The Kids Are Back" (1983)

"I Am (I'm Me)" is a song by American heavy metal band Twisted Sister, released in March 1983 as the lead single from their second studio album, You Can't Stop Rock 'n' Roll. The song was written by Dee Snider and produced by Stuart Epps. "I Am (I'm Me)" was Twisted Sister's first chart hit, reaching number 18 in the UK Singles Chart. It was their highest-charting entry in the UK and remained in the top 75 for nine weeks.

== Background ==
In a 2016 interview with Songfacts, Snider singled out "I Am (I'm Me)" as one Twisted Sister song which he felt deserved more attention. He recalled, "'I Am (I'm Me)' should have gotten a lot more [attention]. It was our first hit in England, but it never got released in the States, and it could have been as big as 'We're Not Gonna Take It' as a rock anthem. And it's one of my favorite songs statement-wise."

== Release ==
"I Am (I'm Me)" was Twisted Sister's debut single on Atlantic and preceded the release of its parent album, You Can't Stop Rock 'n' Roll. It was the label's senior vice president, Phil Carson, who signed the band to the label after seeing them perform live and, after then receiving a demo tape from them, identified "I Am (I'm Me)", among others, as a potential hit. The band soon began recording You Can't Stop Rock 'n' Roll at Sol Studios in Cookham, England, and as recording approached completion, Carson devised a plan to give them their commercial breakthrough by releasing "I Am (I'm Me)" as a single. To provide some B-sides without sourcing songs from the upcoming album, Carson arranged for the band to perform two shows at London's Marquee Club on March 5 and 6, 1983. Three live recordings would be produced for the single: "Sin After Sin" for both the 7-inch and 12-inch releases and "Destroyer" and "It's Only Rock 'n' Roll" for the 12-inch release. The single was a success, reaching number 18 in the UK Singles Chart.

== Promotion ==
In April 1983, the band embarked on a 12-date UK tour to promote both the single and the new album. As the song climbed the UK charts, the band performed it on Top of the Pops. Their appearance on the show, in full makeup, resulted in the BBC receiving a number of complaints from viewers. Snider recalled in his 2012 autobiography Shut Up and Give Me the Mic: A Twisted Memoir, "Despite the fact that we were on with Boy George and Culture Club, the TOTP viewers were mortified by our appearance and demeanor. Of course the metal fans loved having one of their own on the show for a change."

== Critical reception ==
Upon its release as a single, Pete Makowski of Kerrang! stated, "With the raw, basic but powerful production of Stuart Epps, the band have finally been able to transfer that OTT energy onto plastic. 'I Am (I'm Me)' is an obligatory stab at the commercial market and with a good video they could crack it." He also noted that, whereas "I Am (I'm Me)" "sound[ed] like the acceptable face of glitter", it was the live tracks included on the 12-inch single where "these grotesque gargoyles of randy rock deliver straight from the hip with a non stop blitzkrieg of noize and expletives deleted straight from the Marquee desk". Kimberley Leston of Smash Hits called it "sweaty rock for the lads delivered by a gruesome-looking bunch in extremely ungainly togs". Jim Reid of Record Mirror wrote, "People get paid quite good money to drill the roads. My advice to Twisted Sister, grab a pneumatic pretty damn quick, it'll make a sweeter sound than this record and pays a lot beter than the royalties from five record sales."

== Track listing ==
7–inch single (UK and Europe)

1. "I Am (I'm Me)" – 3:36
2. "Sin After Sin" (Recorded live at the Marquee, 5/6 March 1983) – 3:26

12–inch single (UK and Europe)

1. "I Am (I'm Me)" – 3:36
2. "Sin After Sin" (Recorded live at the Marquee, 5/6 March 1983) – 3:26
3. "Destroyer" (Recorded live at the Marquee, 5/6 March 1983) – 4:23
4. "It's Only Rock 'n' Roll" (Recorded live at the Marquee, 5/6 March 1983) – 11:09

== Personnel ==
Twisted Sister

- Dee Snider – lead vocals, backing vocals
- Jay Jay French – guitars, backing vocals
- Eddie "Fingers" Ojeda – guitars, backing vocals
- Mark "The Animal" Mendoza – bass, backing vocals
- A. J. Pero – drums, backing vocals

Production

- Stuart Epps – production (all tracks), engineering ("I Am (I'm Me)" only), mixing (all tracks)
- Mark "The Animal" Mendoza – studio assistance (all tracks)
- Charles Barreca – live sound engineering ("Sin After Sin", "Destroyer" and "It's Only Rock 'n' Roll")
- Phil Harding – engineering ("Sin After Sin", "Destroyer" and "It's Only Rock 'n' Roll")

Other

- Ross Halfin – front sleeve photography (7-inch single)
- Fin Costello – back sleeve photography (7-inch single), photography (12-inch single)
- Suzette Guilot Snider – costume and makeup design

== Charts ==
Chart (1983)	Peak position
Ireland (IRMA)	25
UK Singles (OCC)	18
UK Heavy Metal Singles (MRIB)	1
