= Still Hungry (Twisted Sister album) =

Studio album of re-recorded songs by Twisted Sister
- Released: October 19, 2004
- Recorded: January–July 2004
- Studios: Pie Studios, Glen Cove, New York
- Genres: Heavy metal, hard rock, glam metal
- Length: 71:26
- Labels: Spitfire (US); Drakkar (Europe); Armoury (Japan); Rhino (Reissue)
- Producers: Mark Mendoza, Jay Jay French, Phil Carson

Twisted Sister chronology
The Essentials (2002)	Still Hungry (2004)	Live at Wacken: The Reunion (2005)

Still Hungry is the sixth studio album by the American heavy metal band Twisted Sister, released on October 19, 2004.

It is a re-recording of the 1984 album Stay Hungry, with seven bonus tracks, recorded with a more rough-edged sound than the 1984 record which the band had always felt was too slick and didn’t reflect their creative vision. "Never Say Never" and "Blastin' Fast & Loud", were demoed during the original 1984 sessions, completed by the classic line-up in 2001 and recorded for the release of Club Daze Volume II: Live in the Bars in 2002. "Come Back", "Plastic Money", "You Know I Cry" and "Rock 'n' Roll Saviors" are brand new 2004 studio tracks. "Heroes Are Hard to Find" was originally recorded and released in 1998 by the reunited band for the soundtrack of Strangeland, a horror movie written by and starring frontman Dee Snider based on the character Captain Howdy from "Horror-Teria".

The version of "I Wanna Rock" from this album is featured in the video games Guitar Hero Encore: Rocks the 80s (2007) and Burnout Paradise (2008).

British rock band Cryogen have a song on their first album Daylight named “Still Hungry”, which they have confirmed is a reference to this album.

== Reception ==
Professional ratings
Review scores
Source	Rating
AllMusic	3.5/5 stars
Brave Words & Bloody Knuckles	9.0/10
Classic Rock	3/5 stars

Alex Henderson of AllMusic suggested that casual listeners "start out with Stay Hungry, not Still Hungry", but he also added: "for collectors and hardcore fans, Still Hungry paints an enjoyable, interesting picture of the sound that Snider and friends originally had in mind for their most famous album."

== Track listing ==
All tracks are written by Dee Snider, except "Heroes Are Hard to Find" by Dee Snider and Bernie Tormé.

Track Listing
No.	Title	Length
1.	"Stay Hungry"	3:14
2.	"We're Not Gonna Take It"	4:36
3.	"Burn in Hell"	5:37
4.	"Horror-Teria (The Beginning): a) Captain Howdy b) Street Justice"	8:42
5.	"I Wanna Rock"	3:15
6.	"The Price"	4:08
7.	"Don't Let Me Down"	4:45
8.	"The Beast"	3:25
9.	"S.M.F."	3:28

Bonus tracks
No.	Title	Length
10.	"Never Say Never"	2:19
11.	"Blastin' Fast & Loud"	3:00
12.	"Come Back"	6:25
13.	"Plastic Money"	4:05
14.	"You Know I Cry"	4:21
15.	"Rock 'n' Roll Saviors"	5:04
16.	"Heroes Are Hard to Find"	5:00

== Personnel ==
=== Twisted Sister ===
- Dee Snider - lead vocals
- Eddie "Fingers" Ojeda - guitars, backing vocals
- Jay Jay French - guitars, backing vocals
- Mark "The Animal" Mendoza - bass, backing vocals
- A. J. Pero - drums, percussion, backing vocals

=== Production ===
- Jay Jay French - executive producer
- Mark "The Animal" Mendoza - producer, mixing
- Danny McNerney - engineer, mixing
- Dylan Ely - assistant engineer
- Joe Lambert - mastering
- Phil Carson - executive producer

== Charts ==
Chart (2008)	Peak position
UK Independent Albums (Official Charts)	18
UK Rock & Metal Albums (Official Charts)	28
