= Scarecrow (band) =

American heavy metal band

- Origin: New York City, United States
- Genre: Heavy metal
- Years active: 1989–present
- Labels: TILT Entertainment, Spectra Records, Redlight Records, Pavement Music
- Members: John Blaze
- Past members: James Harris; Eddie Ojeda; Rickie Panzica; Jimmy Quinn; Bobby Marks; T. J. Jordan; Rex Lengyel; David Leitner; Billy Childs
- Website: http://www.scarecrowband.com

Scarecrow is an American heavy metal band from New York City, formed in 1989. The band was founded by John Blaze. The band also featured former Twisted Sister guitarist Eddie Ojeda and enjoyed limited success in the USA during the explosion of glam metal in the late 1980s. Scarecrow has released three studio albums to date.

In 2026, the band released a single, Twisted, which was nominated for Song of the Year in the metal/alternative category at the 12th Annual Josie Music Awards.

== Discography ==
=== Albums ===
- Scarecrow (1992)
- A Touch of Madness (1995)
- Blood, Sweat and 20 Years (2012)

=== Singles ===
- TWISTED (2026)
