= Ruff Cutts =

1982 EP by Twisted Sister

EP by Twisted Sister
- Released: July 23, 1982
- Length: 18:12
- Label: Secret
- Producers: Twisted Sister; Eddie Kramer

Twisted Sister chronology
Ruff Cutts (1982)	Under the Blade (1982)

Ruff Cutts is an EP by American heavy metal band Twisted Sister, released by Secret in 1982.

In 2011, the complete EP was remastered and included as bonus tracks on the 2011 Eagle Rock Entertainment special edition CD/DVD release of Under the Blade.

== Background ==
Ruff Cutts was released in the UK only by the independent label Secret Records, who signed the band in 1982. While the band were in England recording their debut album, Under the Blade, the head of the label, Martin Hooker, proposed capitalising on some of the band's buzz in the British music press by releasing an EP to "cope with demand for Twisted Sister product" and provide "a taster of what's to come" on their debut album. Snider recalled in his 2012 autobiography, Shut Up and Give Me the Mic: A Twisted Memoir, "Happy to get any product out into the marketplace, we readily agreed."

The EP contained four demo tracks, all of which had appeared on a demo tape given by the band to Secret Records prior to signing with them. "What You Don't Know" and "Shoot 'Em Down" were recorded at Bolognese Studios, Merrick, New York, in 1981, with Twisted Sister producing themselves and Denny McNerny as engineer. "Under the Blade" and "Leader of the Pack" were recorded at Electric Lady Studios in Greenwich Village, with Eddie Kramer as the producer, in November 1979. All of the tracks except "Leader of the Pack" were re-recorded for Under the Blade. The band re-recorded "Leader of the Pack" in 1985 for their fourth studio album Come Out and Play.

Ruff Cutts was released in late July 1982. The marketing campaign for the EP included fly-posting, consumer press advertising, t-shirt badges and point of sale material. Ruff Cutts failed to enter the UK Singles Chart, but did reach number 2 in the UK Heavy Metal Singles chart, compiled by MRIB, in August 1982.

== Critical reception ==
Professional ratings
Review scores
Source	Rating
AllMusic	3/5 stars

Upon its release, Dave Dickson of Kerrang! wrote, "At last! Twisted Sister vinyl available in the UK. Miss this at your peril, a four-track EP of medulla-mashing metal. These ditties are about as subtle as a poke in the eye. Glorious stuff." Edwin Pouncey of Sounds called the EP a "pleasant surprise" and "remarkably entertaining". He continued, "Although it's a basic diet of hard rock supplemented by the expected bouts of macho puffing and panting, screaming and yelling, etc, the showmanship present gives you a pretty clear idea of just how much fun a night out with the Twisted Sisters could be." Robin Smith of Record Mirror noted Twisted Sister's "good repute based largely on outlandish stage shows", but felt Ruff Cutts "doesn't commit that excitement to vinyl" and was "a little tame" as a result. In a retrospective review, Eduardo Rivadavia of AllMusic called Ruff Cutts "a right corker", with the "vicious" "Under the Blade" and "punchy" "Shoot 'Em Down". He was less impressed with the cover of "Leader of the Pack", calling it "painfully saccharine".

== Track listing ==
All songs written by Dee Snider except "Leader of the Pack" by Ellie Greenwich, Shadow Morton and Jeff Barry.

Side one

1. "What You Don't Know" – 5:34
2. "Shoot 'Em Down" – 3:59

Side two

1. "Under the Blade" – 4:41
2. "Leader of the Pack" – 3:58

== Personnel ==
Twisted Sister

- Dee Snider – lead vocals
- Jay Jay French – guitars, backing vocals
- Eddie Ojeda – guitars, backing vocals
- Mark "The Animal" Mendoza – bass

Additional musicians

- Joey Brighton – drums ("What You Don't Know" and "Shoot 'Em Down")
- Tony Petri – drums ("Under the Blade" and "Leader of the Pack")

Production

- Twisted Sister – production ("What You Don't Know" and "Shoot 'Em Down")
- Eddie Kramer – production ("Under the Blade" and "Leader of the Pack")
- Denny McNerny – engineering ("What You Don't Know" and "Shoot 'Em Down")
- Charlie Barreca – soundman

Other

- Michael Kagen – photography

== Charts ==
Chart (1982)	Peak position
UK Heavy Metal Singles (MRIB)	2
