= New York Steel =

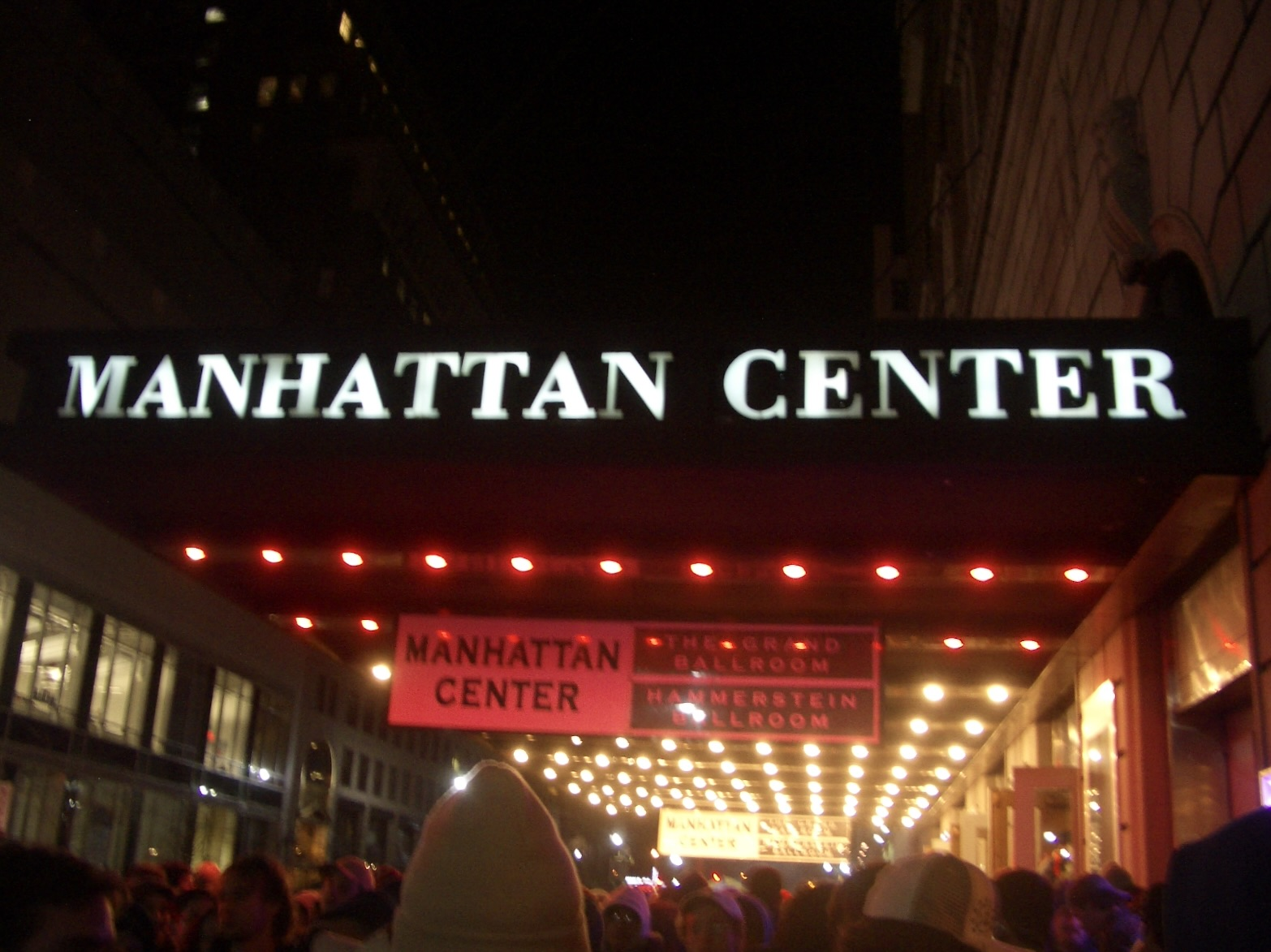
Hammerstein Ballroom

New York Steel was a benefit concert emceed by Eddie Trunk and Mike Piazza, featuring heavy metal musicians, that took place on November 28, 2001, at Hammerstein Ballroom in New York City in response to the September 11, 2001 attacks.

Twisted Sister headlined, returning to the stage together for the first time in 14 years. The sold-out show raised an estimated $90,000 for the New York Police and Fire Widows' and Children's Benefit Fund.

== Participants ==
- Twisted Sister
- Anthrax
- Ace Frehley
- Sebastian Bach
- Overkill
