= Phil Carson =

Senior Vice President of Atlantic Records

Phil Carson is an English former record label owner and London-based Senior Vice President of Atlantic Records from 1968 to 1985. He is known for his association with several rock bands, including Led Zeppelin, Yes, AC/DC, and Twisted Sister.

Born in London, he was playing bass guitar in a school band eventually being tapped to play bass for Dusty Springfield. Gravitating toward the business side of music, Carson started at Swedish record label Olga Records. Nesuhi Ertegun hired Carson to run Atlantic in the UK. He cites the Ertegun brothers as mentors, particularly Ahmet, with whom he eventually co-produced The Honeydrippers album.

Carson spent considerable time touring with bands he represented, most notably Led Zeppelin. He performed onstage with Led Zeppelin and AC/DC. Carson had a close working relationship with AC/DC, being the only record executive thanked by name on original pressings of “Back in Black” and “For Those About to Rock”.

After leaving Atlantic records, he started a management company with clients who have included Jimmy Page, Robert Plant, Paul Rodgers, Yes, Motorhead, Bonham, Asia, Foreigner, Ben E. King, Bad Company, and others. This is where Carson assembled The Firm, the super group featuring Jimmy Page and Paul Rodgers.

Carson moved to the US in 1989 to run JVC’s Victory Music. He then headed up the music department at The Shooting Gallery an independent film studio. Here Carson curated the soundtrack for some award-winning films. Carson was also the responsible for the reformation of the progressive rock band Emerson, Lake & Palmer in 1991, which had been disbanded since 1979. Since the early 1990s, Carson has kept a few clients in his management roster including Foreigner and Dee Snider.
