= Hot Love (Twisted Sister song) =

Single by Twisted Sister

from the album Love Is for Suckers
- B-side: "Tonight"
- Released: June 26, 1987
- Genre: Pop metal
- Length: 3:45
- Label: Atlantic
- Songwriter: Dee Snider
- Producer: Beau Hill

Twisted Sister singles chronology
"Leader of the Pack" (1985)	"Hot Love" (1987)	"Love Is for Suckers" (1987)

"Hot Love" is a song by the American heavy metal band Twisted Sister, released on June 26, 1987 as the lead single from their fifth studio album, Love Is for Suckers. It was written by frontman Dee Snider and produced by Beau Hill. The song reached No. 31 on the US Billboard Album Rock Tracks chart, making it the band's last single to chart anywhere in the world.

"Hot Love" was released in North America, Europe, Australia and Japan. The B-side, "Tonight", was taken from Love Is for Suckers.

== Music video ==
The song's music video was directed by Jon Small. It achieved medium rotation on MTV. The video features the band without both their trademark makeup and the slapstick comedy elements of some of their earlier videos. Snider told the Los Angeles Times Syndicate in 1987, "With the image in videos we had, people started saying we were a joke. So we dropped the makeup and deliberately didn't do a funny video. [It's] a basic rock 'n' roll video."

The video was filmed in various places on Long Island, including the old Pathmark Mall shopping center on Deer Park Avenue in North Babylon which has since been demolished and is now an Aldi and Planet Fitness.

== Critical reception ==
On its release, Cash Box said, "The drums sound like they were recorded in an airplane hangar and there's enough guitar brawn here to strong arm even the toughest ears. All of the sonic boom, though, is in the service of a truly engaging pop song." Billboard commented, "Dee and the boys deliver an incisive rock number that buoys their instinctive delivery with much commercial appeal."

Chicago Tribune said of the song in a review of Love Is for Suckers, "The best song on the album, 'Hot Love,' is deep-fried in committed drumming and fluent guitars that don't overwhelm melody. It's the best Twisted Sister tune since 'We're Not Gonna Take It'." The Washington Post said "Twisted Sister's raw image was totally out of sync with the melodic 'Hot Love,' an obvious attempt to break into the mainstream market." Greg Prato of AllMusic retrospectively described "Hot Love" as a stand-out on Love Is for Suckers.

== Formats ==
7" single

1. "Hot Love" - 3:45
2. "Tonight" - 3:51

7" single (US promo)

1. "Hot Love" - 3:45
2. "Hot Love" - 3:45

12" single (US promo)

1. "Hot Love (Vocal/LP Version)" - 3:44
2. "Hot Love (Vocal/LP Version)" - 3:44

== Charts ==
Chart (1987)	Peak position
US Billboard Album Rock Tracks	31
US AOR Tracks (Radio & Records)	40
