= Twisted Sister =

American heavy metal and glam rock band

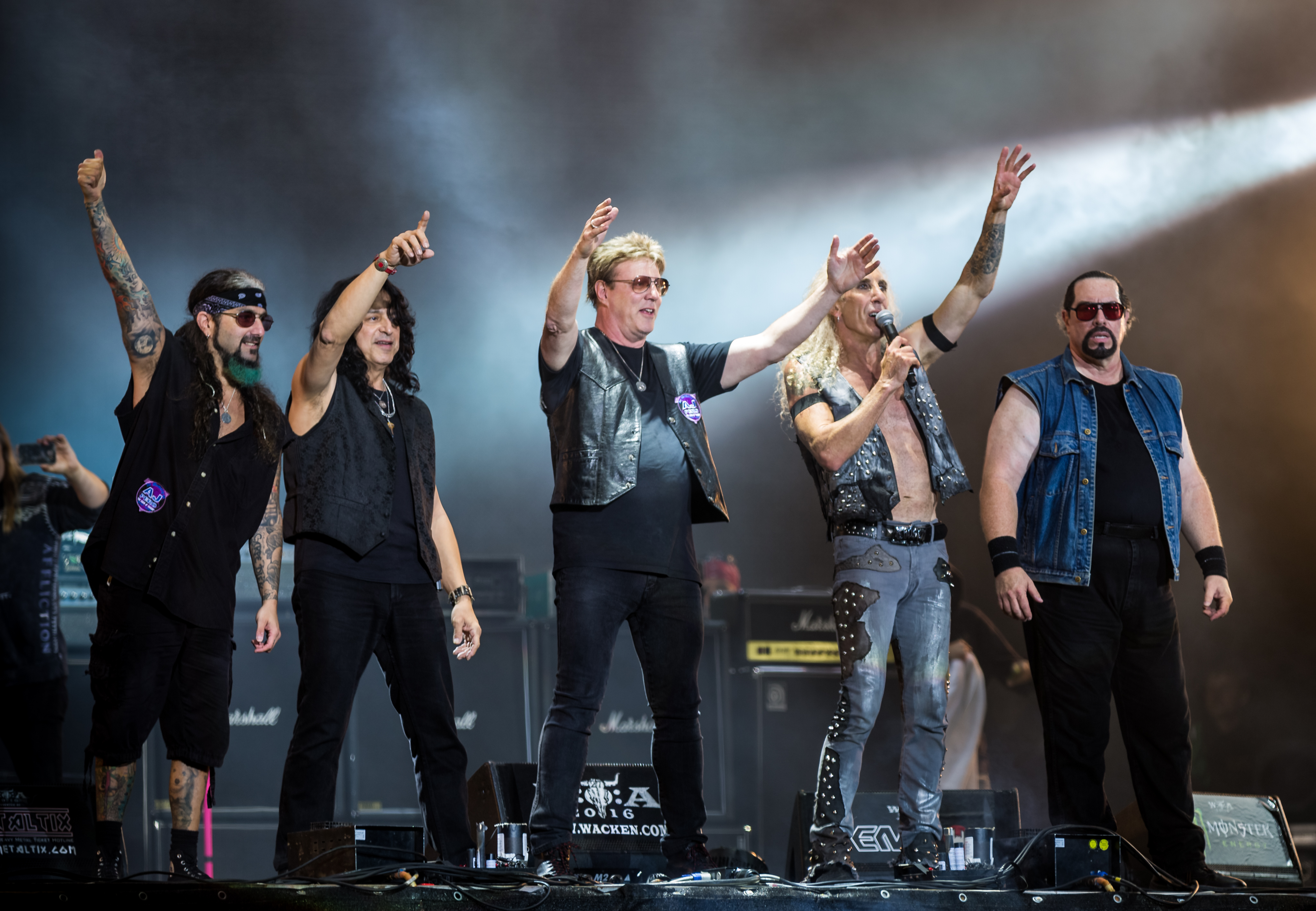
- Twisted Sister at Wacken Open Air 2016

Background information
- Also known as: Silverstar (1972–1973); Bent Brother (1973–1976); Twisted Sister featuring Sebastian Bach (2026–present)
- Origin: Ho-Ho-Kus, New Jersey, U.S.
- Genres: Heavy metal; glam metal; hard rock; shock rock
- Years active: 1972–1988; 1998; 2000; 2001; 2003–2016; 2023; 2025–present
- Labels: Secret; Atlantic; Spitfire; Razor & Tie
- Members: Jay Jay French; Eddie "Fingers" Ojeda; Russell Pzütto; Sebastian Bach; Joey Cassata
- Past members: Dee Snider; Mark "The Animal" Mendoza; A. J. Pero; Joey Franco; See List of Twisted Sister members for others
- Website: twistedsister.com
- Logo
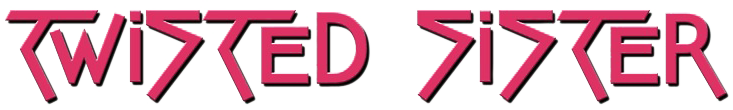

Twisted Sister is an American heavy metal band formed in 1972 in Ho-Ho-Kus, New Jersey, and later based on Long Island, New York. Their best-known songs include "We're Not Gonna Take It" and "I Wanna Rock", both of which were associated with music videos noted for their sense of slapstick humour. Besides their music, the band is equally remembered for their hairstyles and for wearing androgynous clothing and makeup, leading to their categorization in the hair metal scene of the 1980s.

Twisted Sister evolved from a band named Silver Star, and experienced several membership changes before settling on the classic lineup of Jay Jay French (guitars), Eddie "Fingers" Ojeda (guitars), Dee Snider (lead vocals), Mark "The Animal" Mendoza (bass), and A. J. Pero (drums) in 1982. It was this lineup which recorded the band's first four albums. Twisted Sister's first two albums, Under the Blade (1982) and You Can't Stop Rock 'n' Roll (1983), were critically well-received and earned the band underground popularity. The band achieved mainstream success with their third album, Stay Hungry (1984), and its single "We're Not Gonna Take It", which was their only Top 40 hit on the Billboard Hot 100. Their next two albums, Come Out and Play (1985) and Love Is for Suckers (1987), did not match the success of Stay Hungry, and Twisted Sister disbanded in 1988.

During the late 1990s and early 2000s, the band played a series of one-time shows before reuniting more permanently in 2003. They released two more albums, Still Hungry (2004), a re-recording of their third album, and a Christmas album, A Twisted Christmas (2006). Following Pero's death in 2015, the band embarked on a farewell tour and subsequently separated again after completing the tour in 2016. They announced another reunion in September 2025, but their planned tour dates were cancelled in February 2026 due to Snider's health issues, which resulted in his departure from the band. In the following month, it was announced that Twisted Sister will continue as a band, with former Skid Row singer Sebastian Bach filling in for Snider.

In 2013, Corey Deiterman of The Houston Press placed Twisted Sister eighth on his list of "The 10 Worst Metal Bands of the '80s". Conversely, two years later Twisted Sister was ranked at No. 73 on VH1's list of "100 greatest artists of hard rock" in 2015. One year later, the staff of Loudwire named them the 43rd-best metal band of all time. In 2020, Jeff Mezydlo of Yardbarker included them in his list of "the 20 greatest hair metal bands of all time", placing them third.

== History ==
=== Early days (1972–1976) ===
In late December 1972, Manhattan resident John Segall (who later renamed himself "Jay Jay French") auditioned for, and was asked to join, the "glitter band" Silver Star from Ho-Ho-Kus, New Jersey. Silver Star was formed by drummer Mel Anderson ("Mel Star") as the "New Jersey version of the New York Dolls", consisting of Billy Diamond (lead guitar), Wayne Brown (lead vocals and guitar), Tony Bunn (bass) and Steve Guarino (keyboards). Michael O'Neill took over the lead vocals from Brown, who had left; Segall hated the name "Silver Star", and pushed to have it changed. O'Neill came up with the name "Twisted Sister" at a rehearsal on Valentine's Day in 1973. Along with the name change came stylistic changes that eventually spurred several members to leave the band, amicably, including Bunn and Guarino; Diamond, Star, Segall (now "Johnny Heartbreaker", soon to change his name permanently to "Jay Jay French"), and new bass player Kenneth Harrison Neill made-up the next lineup of Twisted Sister.

The band found work immediately, and started playing six nights a week. They secured a residency at the Mad Hatter in East Quogue, New York, for the summer of 1973 and played 78 shows there, and another 27 shows elsewhere, for a total of 105 shows from Memorial Day to Labor Day. By December 1974, Jay Jay had already played nearly 600 nights and about 3,000 performances, as the band played five 40-minute shows per night (each with costume changes) some ending as late as 8 AM, the following morning. At this point, the band broke-up and a second iteration brought in a new lead singer (Rick Prince) and guitar player (Keith Angel). After Prince failed to show for a rehearsal in early 1975, Jay Jay took over the lead vocals and management duties. The band split up after Labor Day weekend 1975. In October 1975, the fourth version of the band started to play the club circuit. Jay Jay hired a former high school friend named Eddie Ojeda, who joined as co-lead singer and second guitarist, and got drummer Kevin John Grace after reading an ad that Kevin had put in the Village Voice. Bassist Neill remained and completed the lineup. The band followed a more glam rock direction, influenced by David Bowie, Slade, Mott the Hoople, the Rolling Stones, and the New York Dolls. They played at local clubs, but floundered in relative obscurity.

=== Club days (1976–1982) ===
In February 1976, at the suggestion of the band's agent, Kevin Brenner, Jay Jay was told that the band could only go so far without being able to play Led Zeppelin cover songs and urged Jay Jay to hire Danny Snider (Dee Snider), who had been in the bands Peacock and Heathen. Danny changed his name to Dee at Jay Jay's suggestion and thus began line up number six of Twisted Sister. This version lasted just six weeks, with drummer Grace departing. The group took a heavier musical direction in April 1976 with the addition of new drummer Tony Petri, who was heavily influenced by Black Sabbath, Led Zeppelin, Slade, and Alice Cooper. In 1978 Neill became a born-again Christian after a stint in rehab for alcoholism; his parish, however, objected to his participation in the band, which they deemed to be Satanic. After his departure, the band recruited Dictators bassist Mark Mendoza to replace him.

The band moved in a more heavy metal direction in 1978, when the group began to record its demos. Two of their demos found their way to compilation albums by New York classic rock radio station WBAB, and were later re-recorded for the band's first two albums.

Having audience participation in the "Sweet Jane Gong Show" and the "Death to Disco" stage routines became legendary. The band broke attendance records at large halls in the Tri-State Area and its growing fan base began to take the name "S.M.F.F.O.T.S.", for Sick Motherfucking Friends Of Twisted Sister, later shortened to "S.M.F." for "Sick Mother Fuckers". NME reported that Twisted Sister had sold out the 3,000 capacity New York Palladium for a March 16 show without a recording contract or radio airplay. Fan hysteria and the seemingly "lost art of entertainment" soon became the hallmark of a TS show. After selling out the Palladium, the group began aggressively pursuing a recording contract, with an aim to get out of the club circuit before its impending collapse due to the upcoming change of the drinking age from 18 to 21.

The band went through three more line up changes between 1979 and 1982. Drummer Joey Brighton replaced Tony Petri, former Dictators drummer Richie Teeter replaced Brighton and, finally, on April 1, 1982, AJ Pero replaced Teeter. Future Shark Island and The Scream drummer Walt Woodward III was also in the band for three days in 1982.

The band started its own T-shirt company and record label. The group released two singles that eventually made it over to the UK and caught the attention of Martin Hooker, the president of indie label Secret Records, a small British label that was mainly a punk outlet. Jay Jay remained as manager through 1981 at which time he hired Mark Puma, a local promoter, to manage the band. This lineup (Dee Snider, Jay Jay French, Eddie Ojeda, Mark Mendoza and A.J. Pero) is considered the "official Twisted Sister line up" because this version is responsible for almost all the studio albums, singles, videos and DVDs. On the suggestion of two reporters from Sounds and Kerrang! magazines, Twisted Sister left New York to find a label in the UK. There, in April 1982, they were finally signed by Secret Records. The band also took $22,000 to the UK to appear on the show The Tube.

=== First two albums (1982–1984) ===
In July 1982, the group released its first EP, Ruff Cutts, on the Secret Records label, still featuring Tony Petri on the drums. This was followed shortly by the group's first studio album, Under the Blade, produced by Pete Way of UFO. Despite rather low production quality, the album was an underground hit in the UK, providing the band with sufficient name recognition to open for such metal acts as Motörhead. The album had an overall raw metal sound and included "Tear It Loose", a very fast speed-metal song featuring a guitar solo by "Fast" Eddie Clarke of Motörhead. Another single, the future hit "We're Not Gonna Take It", was planned for release, but Secret Records went out of business before Snider was able to complete the lyrics.

After that appearance on the music TV program The Tube, Atlantic Records approached the band and signed them. Atlantic was one of the labels that had turned Twisted Sister down in the Club Days period. The band's first LP under Atlantic, You Can't Stop Rock 'n' Roll, produced by Stuart Epps, was released in 1983 and included the UK No. 18 hit "I Am (I'm Me)". From a production standpoint, the album sounded better than its predecessor, and it was every bit as heavy. Upon the success of the album the company decided to promote the band more heavily. A music video was made for the title track of You Can't Stop Rock'n'Roll, which was to become the first of a series of comedic videos that popularized the band.

=== Mainstream popularity (1984–1985) ===
International fame came for Twisted Sister when the band's third LP, Stay Hungry, hit the stores on May 10, 1984. During the successful tour, a young Metallica supported the band. Stay Hungry sold more than two million copies by the summer of 1985, and went on to sell more than three million in subsequent years. It remains the band's biggest success.

Videos of hit singles "We're Not Gonna Take It" (No. 21 hit in the United States) and "I Wanna Rock" (No. 68 in the United States) found major popularity on MTV. The comedy film Pee-wee's Big Adventure had the band in a brief cameo appearance making a fictional video for "Burn In Hell" on the Warner Bros. backlot only to be interrupted by Pee-wee Herman passing through.

The band’s comedic videos featured slapstick violence against parents and teachers, which led to criticism. Twisted Sister was singled out by the Parents Music Resource Center in 1985. Their songs "Under the Blade" and "We're Not Gonna Take It" were specifically mentioned in the associated Senate hearings. Snider, along with John Denver and Frank Zappa, testified before a senate committee during these hearings on September 19, 1985.

Frontman Dee Snider recalled learning that Stay Hungry had gone platinum while on tour with Y&T and Lita Ford as support acts, with the band and crew chanting "Platinum! Platinum! Platinum!" at soundcheck. Guitarist Jay Jay French later reflected that MTV exposure was double-edged: "MTV did us the biggest disservice on the planet. It gave us this super-Technicolor, larger-than-life thing in America. And it was overwhelming." MTV executive Rick Krim observed that the band's videos "had the same vibe to them," noting that at a certain point that consistency simply became "what Twisted Sister is" — which, he said, was what the band wanted.

=== Decline and fall (1985–1988) ===
On November 9, 1985, the band released its fourth studio album, Come Out and Play, produced by Dieter Dierks. It was not nearly as successful as its predecessor, although it did earn the band a gold certification for sales of 500,000 copies. Some speculate that the failure was partly due to MTV choosing not to air the video for "Be Chrool to Your Scuel" on the grounds that it was graphically offensive. The song featured such guests as Alice Cooper (who also stars in the video), Brian Setzer, Clarence Clemons and Billy Joel. The tour supporting the album was a near fiasco, with low attendance and many cancelled dates. Not even Atlantic's re-release of a remixed Under the Blade helped the band recover its popularity. Come Out and Play was one of the first CDs to go out of print.

After the tour, Pero left to rejoin Cities. He was replaced by ex-Good Rats drummer Joey "Seven" Franco. The nickname "Seven" comes from his being the band's seventh drummer.

In 1986, Snider embarked on a solo project, reportedly approaching future Iron Maiden guitarist Janick Gers, but this did not work out. Janick recalls it as follows: "He rang me up and we talked but I remember saying, 'There is no way in this world that I am putting on make up or anything like that, I'm just not into that shit.' But we had a chat and he seemed like a nice enough guy. But I never heard back from him."

Snider then recorded an album with Franco programming the drum machine and featuring several session musicians such as Reb Beach on guitar and Kip Winger (just before they formed Winger) and Steve Whiteman of Kix. Atlantic Records refused to release it unless it was labeled as a Twisted Sister album. So, on August 13, 1987 Love Is for Suckers made its debut. Although the band had not played in the recording sessions, it was mentioned on the album cover as if the group had, and the band did play some of the songs in subsequent shows. Beau Hill's production gave the album a very polished pop metal sound. The band's members had also removed the makeup that they had been wearing since their early days. The music video for the lead single "Hot Love", featuring the band members without their makeup, had moderate success on MTV. Commercially though, the album was a complete failure and many of the band's metal fans were disappointed with the pop sound.

On October 12, 1987, almost two months after the release of Love Is for Suckers, Snider left the band, the record label cancelled its contract, and Twisted Sister disbanded. The public announcement of the band's demise came in January 1988.

=== Separation period (1988–1998) ===
After the band's break-up, former members were involved in different projects:

- Snider formed Desperado, Widowmaker, and SMFs. Joey Franco also played drums in Widowmaker. Snider also wrote and starred in the movie Strangeland.
- Ojeda went on to join Scarerow and then formed Prisoners of War. He also worked as a session guitarist and guitar instructor.
- French stopped performing except for some guest appearances. He formed French Management and produced the alternative metal band Sevendust's first self-titled album.
- Mendoza briefly joined Blackfoot. Then he worked as a producer and manager. He also occasionally pursued solo projects.
- Pero was involved in several projects and subsequently toured with Snider's SMFs. Pero for a time during this period also worked in a now defunct (as of January 2017) Staten Island, NY audio shop called Clone Audio.
- Franco worked as a session drummer and played with Snider's Widowmaker.

In 1992, Atlantic Records released a "best of" album Big Hits and Nasty Cuts that also featured some live performances from the Under The Blade period. This album was compiled by French. A live album from the Stay Hungry era named Live At Hammersmith was released in 1994 by CMC International.

=== Reunions and reissues (1998–2014) ===
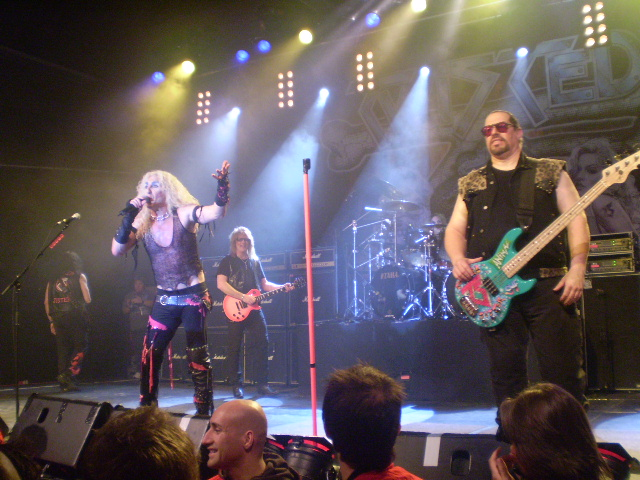
Twisted Sister in Sweden in 2007

Twisted Sister's first reunion was in 1998 when the band recorded one song, "Heroes Are Hard to Find", for the soundtrack of Snider's movie Strangeland.

In 1999, Spitfire Records re-issued the group's back catalog, supplemented with previously unreleased tracks. This was followed by Club Daze Volume 1: The Studio Sessions, an album containing demo recordings from the pre-Under the Blade era, which has three songs that were written by French, this was the first time someone other than Snider was writing songs and Club Daze Volume 2: Live In The Bars, a live counterpart.

In 2001, Koch Records released a tribute album under the name Twisted Forever: A Tribute To The Legendary Twisted Sister. The album featured a wide range of artists and bands who had been influenced by Twisted Sister, including Lit, Motörhead, Chuck D, Anthrax, Overkill, Cradle of Filth, Joan Jett, Sebastian Bach, and HammerFall. Oddly for a tribute album, Twisted Sister was also present with a cover of AC/DC's "Sin City".

In November 2001, the reunited Twisted Sister joined fellow New York metal artists Anthrax, Overkill, Sebastian Bach, and Ace Frehley to headline a benefit concert for NYPD and FDNY Widows and Orphans Fund in the wake of the September 11, 2001 attacks on the World Trade Center. New York Steel raised over $100,000 for the charity, and the reaction to the first Twisted Sister set in 14 years was overwhelming. The demand for more live dates was immediate and the band took the first steps toward returning to the concert stage.

In 2002, a remastered "best of" compilation named Essentials was released. Fans generally consider this to be a better compilation than the one previously issued by Atlantic.

2002 also saw the featuring of "I Wanna Rock" as one of the gameplay radio songs on the videogame Grand Theft Auto: Vice City. The song features in the playlist of the fictional radio station "V Rock".

In 2003, Snider and Franco collaborated on a Halloween-themed project called Van Helsing's Curse. The project's first album, Oculus Infernum, was released by Koch Records and featured a blend of heavy metal and orchestral elements in the style of Trans-Siberian Orchestra.

Twisted Sister, this time including Mark Mendoza, reunited again for the Sweden Rock Festival in June 2003. The band also appeared in August of that same year at the Wacken Open Air festival. Footage from that show was filmed for a DVD release, which featured former Violent Apathy and Spite member, Tom Fuller.

In March 2004, the band entered the studio to completely re-record the group's Stay Hungry album for Demolition Records. The band members reported that they were not happy with the original album's production, so this time they produced it themselves. The re-recording was released under the name Still Hungry and contained seven bonus tracks.

In July 2005, the group played a free concert in Edmonton for the Klondike Days festival. In late 2005, Snider appeared on Numbers from the Beast: An All-Star Tribute to Iron Maiden, performing vocals for the Iron Maiden classic "Wasted Years". Snider was joined by his contemporaries and peers George Lynch, formerly of Dokken, and Bob Kulick. Also in 2005, the band released the 2003 Wacken show on CD and DVD simply titled Live at Wacken. It also went on tour with Alice Cooper, acting as the support band but delivering a set similar to a headliner's.

In 2006, Snider and French worked with Lordi to produce and play on a few tracks on their new album The Arockalypse. Snider was featured on the first track, "SCG3 Special Report", as the voice of Lordi warning of the upcoming Arockalypse. French guest starred on the song "Chainsaw Buffet". In June 2006, the band announced that it had signed with the American record label Razor and Tie to release a final album, of heavy metal Christmas music, called A Twisted Christmas. The album was released on October 17, 2006, and was a commercial success. On July 8, 2006, Twisted Sister played in front of 80,000 people in Quebec City, Quebec, Canada. The show featured Scorpions as the headliner. It also played a small concert at the Wolverhampton Civic Center.

Before each of the main shows, they would perform as Bent Brother, practicing their set and appearing without makeup, usually at reduced ticket prices.

Twisted Sister was inducted into the Long Island Music Hall of Fame on October 15, 2006. On December 13, 2006, Twisted Sister made an appearance on The Tonight Show with Jay Leno. The group performed its rock version of "O Come, All Ye Faithful", which is arranged in the style of "We're Not Gonna Take It". On December 22, 2006, Twisted Sister performed the song on CBS's The Late Late Show with Craig Ferguson. On an episode of Snider's syndicated radio program "The House of Hair", he stated that due to the success of the Christmas album, and also due to the response to the tour promoting the album, that Twisted Sister might not retire, and the band's future was being discussed.

On July 15, 2007, Twisted Sister performed at metal festival Rocklahoma.

Twisted Sister's "I Wanna Rock" was featured in the game Guitar Hero Encore: Rocks the 80s as a playable song (instead of being a cover like several songs featured in the game, it was the version from the 2004 remake of the group's classic album Stay Hungry, titled Still Hungry).

In 2008, Snider appeared on the CMT television show Gone Country. On February 25, 2008, Twisted Sister performed at "Aftermath - The Station Fire 5 years later" in Providence, Rhode Island. On May 10, 2008, Twisted Sister performed a free concert at the Bulgarian town, Lovech. On July 13, 2008, Twisted Sister performed at Snatch Rock n Roll Lounge, in Calgary, Alberta. On September 1, 2008, Twisted Sister performed at the Rock The Bayou Festival in Houston, Texas.

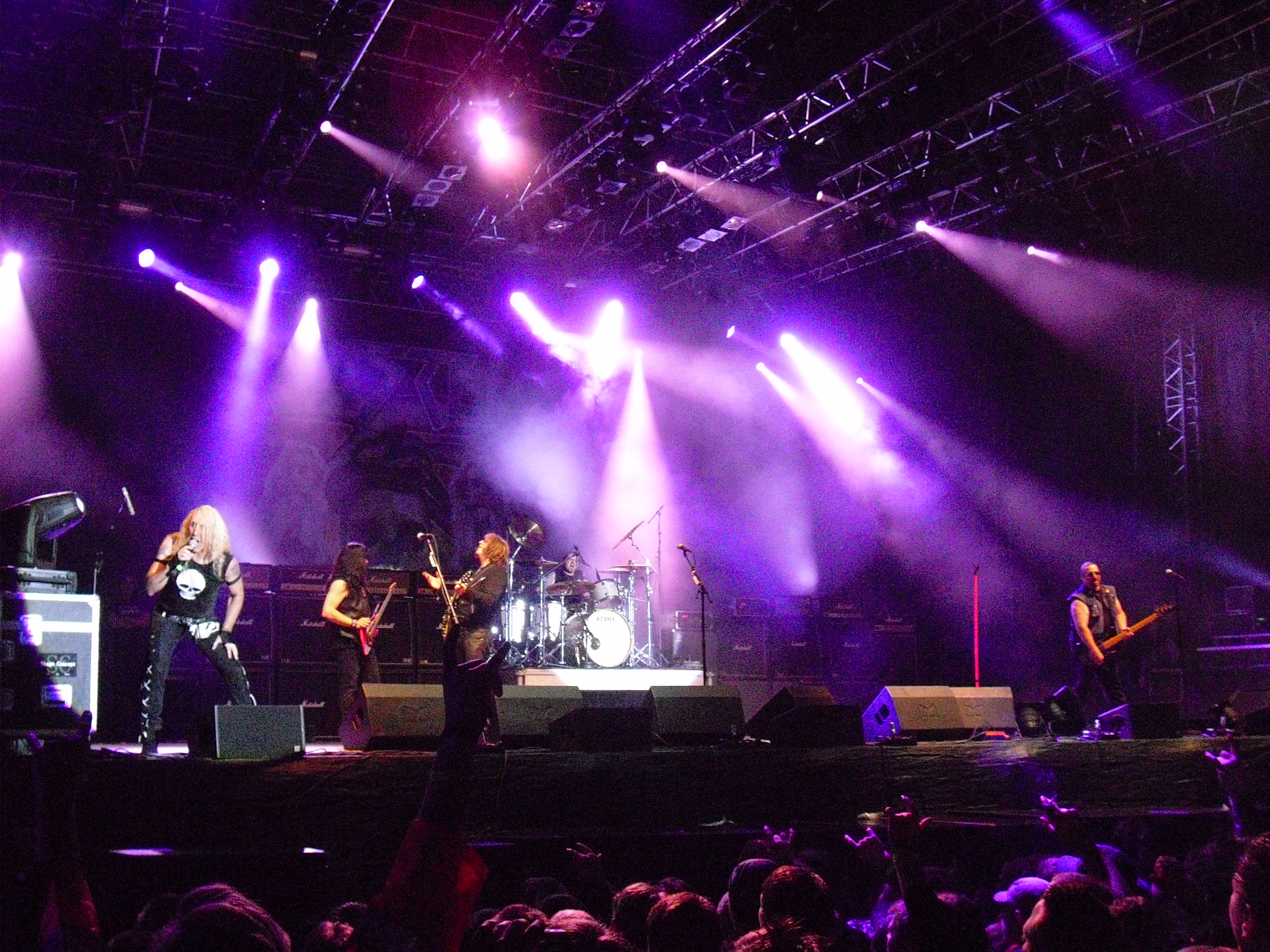
Twisted Sister performing at Norway Rock Festival in 2010

On June 4, 2009, Twisted Sister performed Stay Hungry in its entirety for the first time at the Sweden Rock Festival. This included never before played songs such as "Don't Let Me Down" and "Horror-Teria: Street Justice".

On July 16, 2009, in an interview on Live with Regis and Kelly, Snider said that 2009 was the last year that the band would perform with makeup and costumes.

On February 16, 2010, Twisted Sister were confirmed to play at Bloodstock Open Air 2010.

On July 15, 2011, Twisted Sister were confirmed to play at Masters of Rock.

Twisted Sister performed at Copenhell 2014 in Denmark to an audience of 20,000 as part of the group's Stay Hungry 30th Anniversary World Tour. This was the group's first show in Denmark in 30 years. The Twisted Sister show was praised as one of the best concert performances. The band was "..As Sharp, Crazy and Witty as 30 years ago" according to the Danish press.

On October 13, 2011, the band announced a five-disc DVD set of live performances over the group's entire career entitled From the Bars to the Stars, with a release date of November 8.

Former Twisted Sister drummer Richard Teeter, who had played with the band in 1980 and 1981, died from complications due to esophageal cancer on April 10, 2012.

=== Death of A. J. Pero and farewell tour (2015–2016) ===
On March 20, 2015, drummer A. J. Pero died in his sleep of a heart attack. Twisted Sister released the following statement: "The members of Twisted Sister are profoundly saddened to announce the untimely passing of our brother, AJ Pero. The band, crew and most importantly the family of AJ Pero thank you for your thoughts and prayers at this time." Shortly thereafter, Adrenaline Mob, which also featured Pero on drums, released a statement revealing that Pero had died while sleeping on the band's tour bus.

On April 7, 2015, TMZ.com reported that Twisted Sister would embark on its final tour, dubbed "Forty and Fuck It", in 2016. Mike Portnoy (of The Winery Dogs and Transatlantic and formerly of Dream Theater and Adrenaline Mob) filled in for Pero on drums on this tour. The band also announced tribute shows in honor of A. J. Pero; the first was in Las Vegas, Nevada, on May 30 and was recorded for the CD/DVD release Metal Meltdown—Featuring Twisted Sister Live at The Hard Rock Casino—Las Vegas, released that July. The second was dubbed "Twisted Sister – A Concert to Honor AJ Pero" and held in Sayreville, New Jersey on June 13. On this tour a recording of a drum solo, from one of AJ's last concerts with Twisted Sister, was shown on the stage screen, giving the fans one final experience of the classic line-up together. The recording was from the Faroe Islands Summarfestival. The group played its final concert on November 12, 2016 in Monterrey.

=== Metal Hall of Fame induction, 50th anniversary reunion tour and Sebastian Bach replaces Dee Snider (2023–present) ===
On January 26, 2023, Twisted Sister reunited as they were inducted into the Metal Hall of Fame at The Canyon Club in Agoura Hills. At the event, they performed a special one-off onstage three–song set once again featuring drummer Mike Portnoy filling in for A. J. Pero and guitarist Keith Robert War, who filled in for Eddie Ojeda after contracting COVID-19.

On April 7, 2023, Dee Snider announced the band would reunite in 2024 for appearances at various Democratic political rallies during the 2024 election season. On April 8, 2024, Snider stated to podcast "The Hook Rocks!" that offers the band had been receiving for a reunion were "getting close to being impossible to refuse". Although he reiterated that the numbers were "not there yet" but they "sure as hell seem to be going in that direction".

On September 10, 2025, Twisted Sister announced their reunion and would embark on a world tour, Twisted Forever, Forever Twisted, in 2026 celebrating the band's 50th anniversary, but without bassist Mark Mendoza due to "irreconcilable differences". It will feature Russell Pzütto on bass and Joe Franco on drums. However, on February 5, 2026, the band announced that they had cancelled their entire world tour due to Dee Snider's health, and that the future of the band would be "determined in the next several weeks". On the following day, Dee confirmed he had left Twisted Sister, due to "health challenges". On March 3, it was announced the band would tour later in the year with Sebastian Bach (formerly of Skid Row) as the vocalist.

== Musical style and influences ==
Twisted Sister's music has been variously described as heavy metal, glam metal, hard rock and shock rock, with Dee Snider referring to them as a rock and roll band. Despite its classification as glam metal, Greg Prato of AllMusic compared the band's debut album, Under the Blade, to early 1980s new wave of British heavy metal. Moreover, despite the disdain that thrash metal musicians and fans in the 1980s had towards glam metal, Twisted Sister bridged the gap and could appeal to fans of both genres, with thrash metal band Metallica even opening for them in the 1980s. Thrash metal bands Anthrax and Overkill have covered Twisted Sister songs. Snider spoke about this:

Twisted was a band that confused people a bit. When we first played at the Marquee in London, it was a really mixed crowd. There were metalheads and punks and skinheads, and everyone was looking around 'Wait a minute? What are we about to see here?' At the beginning there was no hair metal or glam movement. We were just a weird metal band at that point! But then we started to break through and we were pulling in people from all areas."

Snider rejected the glam metal label of the band, saying: "I don't think Twisted Sister is 'Glam' because that implies glamour, and we're not glamorous. We should be called 'Hid' because we're hideous." In interviews, Dee Snider cited Slade, the Beatles, Led Zeppelin, Deep Purple, Kiss, Grand Funk Railroad, Black Sabbath, the Rolling Stones, Paul Revere & the Raiders, the Monkees, Alice Cooper, Aerosmith, David Bowie, Queen, Van Halen and AC/DC as influences. Snider underscored Slade and said: "If not for the [English glam rock] band Slade, there would be no 'We're Not Gonna Take It'."

== Band members ==
Current

- Jay Jay French – guitars, backing vocals (1972–1988, 1998, 2001, 2003–2016, 2023, 2025–present)
- Eddie "Fingers" Ojeda – guitars, backing vocals (1975–1988, 1998, 2001, 2003–2016, 2025–present)
- Russell Pzütto – bass, backing vocals (touring 2013; 2025–present)
- Sebastian Bach – lead vocals (2026–present)
- Joey Cassata – drums (2026–present)

== Discography ==
- Under the Blade (1982)
- You Can't Stop Rock 'n' Roll (1983)
- Stay Hungry (1984)
- Come Out and Play (1985)
- Love Is for Suckers (1987)
- Still Hungry (2004)
- A Twisted Christmas (2006)
