= Eddie Ojeda =

American guitarist

Eddie "Fingers" Ojeda
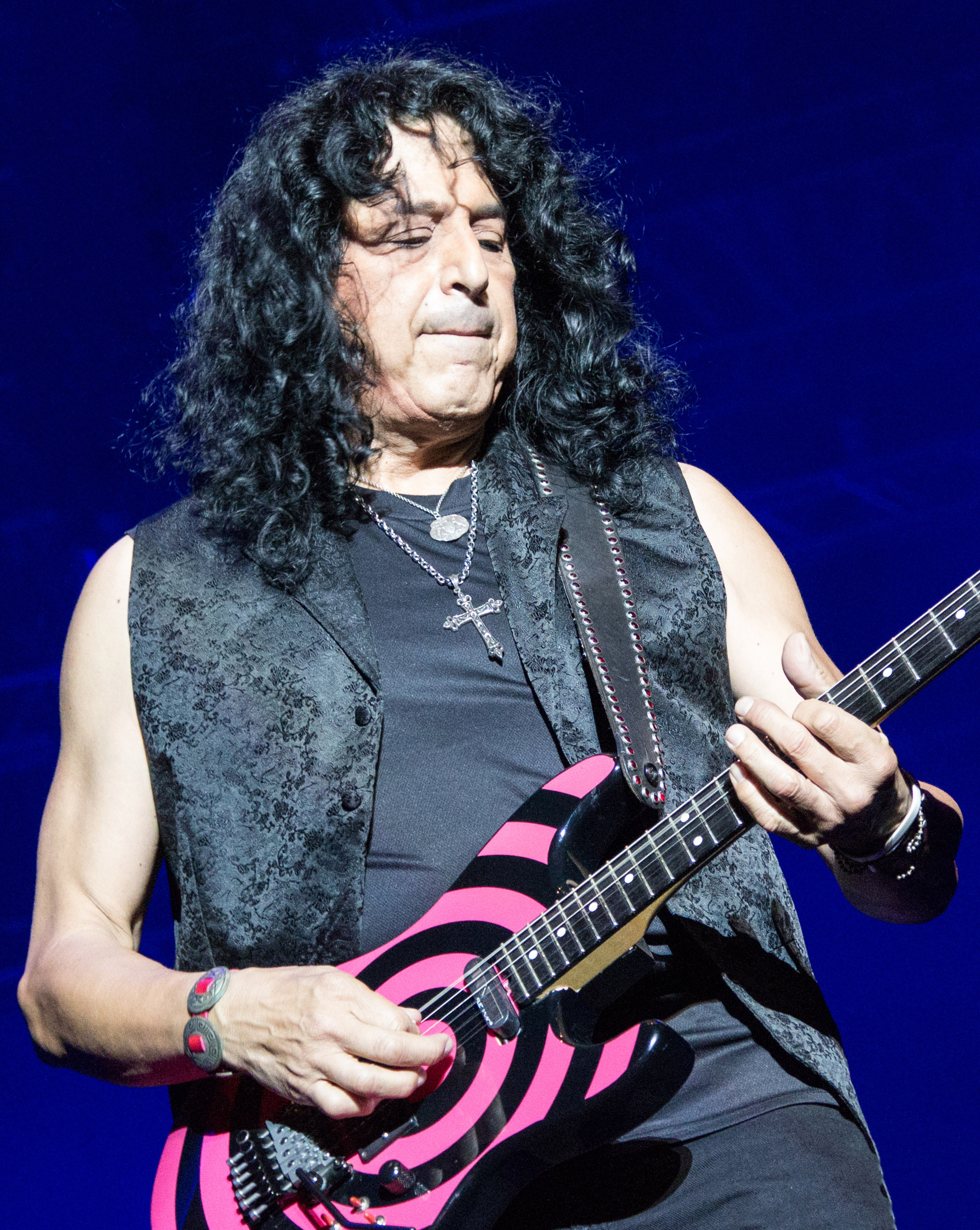
- Ojeda performing in 2014

Background information
- Also known as: Fingers
- Born: Edward Ojeda
- Genres: Heavy metal, glam metal, hard rock
- Occupations: Musician, songwriter
- Instrument: Guitar
- Years active: 1972–present
- Formerly of: Twisted Sister, Scarecrow, SPX, Hear 'n Aid
- Website: eddieojeda.com

Eddie "Fingers" Ojeda is an American musician best known as a guitarist of the heavy metal band Twisted Sister. He was a member of the band's classic lineup.

== Career ==
In the early 1970s he recorded a couple of singles with a band called SPX, with Alan Diaz, Charlie Mercado and Frank Lopez.

He joined Twisted Sister in 1975, becoming one of the band's classic members along with Dee Snider, Jay Jay French, Mark Mendoza and AJ Pero. He played on each of the band's first five albums before their first breakup in 1988. In 1989 he started the band Scarecrow. He also recorded a solo album named Axes To Axes in 2005 featuring Dee Snider, Ronnie James Dio and Rudy Sarzo among others. In a 2006 interview with rock & roll comic C.C. Banana, Eddie revealed if Twisted Sister ever retired that it would still be possible for the band to continue performing under their alternate name Bent Brother.

Eddie, along with other popular rock guitarists in the mid-80's, performed in the Hear 'n Aid project, launched by Ronnie James Dio, which had a similar goal as both Band Aid and USA for Africa.

He rejoined Twisted Sister when the classic lineup reunited in 2003, playing on two more albums with the group, Still Hungry (2004) and A Twisted Christmas (2006).

Eddie toured with Steve Steinman on the "Vampires Rock" tour in late 2007.

Following Pero's death in 2015, Ojeda embarked on Twisted Sister's farewell tour which concluded in 2016.

== Equipment ==
Eddie is best known for his custom black/red "bullseye" guitar. In an interview, he explained that the bullseye was part of the original design of the Twisted Sister logo. The first version of the guitar was manufactured by Charvel in the 1980s. Eddie's current version is by Wayne Guitars, a company founded by Charvel's former owner, Wayne Charvel. He also uses a red/white bullseye Kramer USA 1984 Reissue.

There has been much debate on whether or not Zakk Wylde stole Eddie's bullseye design for his guitars. According to an interview, Eddie never talked to Zakk about it. Furthermore, Zakk claims that his bullseye graphic was actually a mistake by the paint shop; it was originally going to be a spiral reminiscent of Alfred Hitchcock's film Vertigo.

== Personal life ==
Eddie Ojeda is of Puerto Rican descent. He is 5'10" tall.

According to Dee Snider, in the 1970s, Ojeda underwent throat surgery, which inspired the 1982 Twisted Sister song "Under the Blade". In 2019 he underwent surgery for a ruptured disk.

In May 2019, in an interview with "22 Now", Ojeda said he would be relocating to Nashville.

== Solo discography ==
- es:Axes 2 Axes
