= Jay Jay French =

American guitarist, manager and record producer

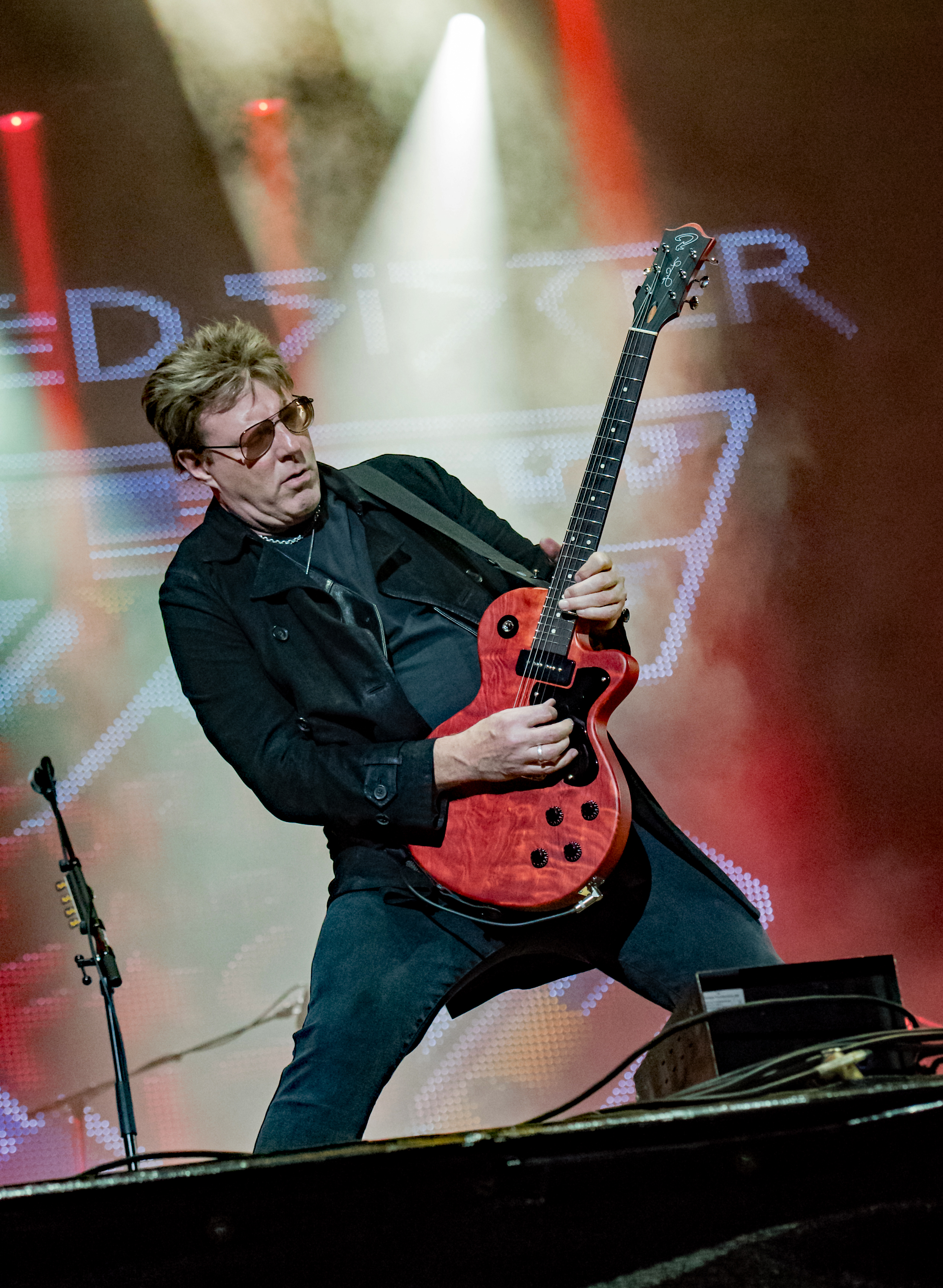
- Jay Jay French performing in 2016 with his Ruokangas guitar

Background information
- Born: John French Segall; July 20, 1952 (age 74); New York City, New York, U.S.
- Genres: Heavy metal, glam metal, hard rock
- Occupation: Guitarist
- Years active: 1973–present
- Labels: Secret; Atlantic; Spitfire; Razor & Tie; Rhino Entertainment
- Website: twistedsister.com

Jay Jay French (born John French Segall, July 20, 1952) is an American guitarist, manager, record producer and the only continuous founding member of the heavy metal band Twisted Sister. He is a columnist, author and motivational speaker who oversees licensing and intellectual property rights for the Twisted Sister brand.

== Early life and education ==
French was born in New York City as the younger of two sons to father Lou Segall, a jewelry salesman, and mother Evaline French Segall, a political consultant for the Democratic Party in New York who worked for the John F. Kennedy presidential campaign. His mother also ran the successful election campaign of Constance Baker Motley, the first African American woman elected to the New York State Senate. He and his brother Jeff Segall grew up in Manhattan.

The seeds for French's musical life were planted in 1963 when he attended his first concert, the folk group The Weavers at Carnegie Hall.

He was an anti-Vietnam war and civil rights activist. In the summer of 1967, he attended the Shaker Village summer program, and was a bunkmate of Ben Chaney, brother of James Chaney, one of the three murdered civil rights workers who died on a voting registration drive in Mississippi in 1964. The events were portrayed in Alan Parker's 1988 film Mississippi Burning.

Two months before graduation, French dropped out of George Washington High School, as a protest to the student murders at Kent State University on May 4, 1970.

== Career ==
=== 1970s ===
French auditioned in 1972 for an early version of Wicked Lester, featuring Gene Simmons and Paul Stanley.

In December of that year, he joined the New Jersey–based glitter band Silverstar, which changed its name in 1973 to Twisted Sister. The band also included Michael Valentine (vocals), Billy Diamond (guitar), Kenneth Harrison Neill (bass) and Mell Star (drums).

In 1975, French hired Rick Prince on vocals and Keith Angel on guitars. Soon after, French took over the vocals.

In late 1975, Eddie Ojeda replaced Keith Angel on guitars, and Daniel Dee Snider joined the band in February 1976, to relieve French from his vocalist duties. Other significant member changes in the history of Twisted Sister include the addition of Tony Petri (drums, April 1976), Mark Mendoza (bass, December 1978), Richie Teeter (drums, December 1980), Joey Brighton (drums, April 1981), Anthony AJ Pero (drums, April 1982) and Joey “Seven” Franco (drums, 1987).

Early editions of Twisted Sister performed six nights a week, with five 40-minute sets each night, including costume changes. Gradually, the band's glam image and music changed into a heavier direction, with influences by artists such as Led Zeppelin, Slade and Alice Cooper.

French, in addition to being one of the band's guitar players, took over as manager from 1975 to 1979, and from 1988 to today.

=== 1980s ===
Twisted Sister's first album release was the EP Ruff Cutts in 1982 by Secret Records.

Twisted Sister released five studio albums between 1982 and 1987, including Under The Blade (1982), You Can't Stop Rock’n’Roll (1983), Stay Hungry (1984), Come Out And Play (1985) and Love Is For Suckers (1987).

Fashion critic Richard Blackwell named Twisted Sister to Mr. Blackwell's Worst-dressed List of 1984, ranking them No. 11 and calling them "a car crash in a whorehouse."

Following the departure of singer Dee Snider and guitarist Eddie Ojeda, French along with bass player Mark Mendoza made a move in 1987 to cease performing live.

French French Management Enterprises and the production company Rebellion Music Inc. From 1988, he took over the management of Twisted Sister again, dealing with the music catalog. He also signed R&B singer George Taylor, blues legend Johnny Gale, David Forman, Thom Jack, Ean Evans' Cupid's Arrow and Tina Sugandh for her debut record.

In 1988, French became a Grammy voting member.

=== 1990s ===
As owner of the Twisted Sister trademark and manager of its affairs, French began producing new Twisted Sister album releases, including the compilation album Big Hits and Nasty Cuts: The Best of Twisted Sister.

In partnership with Dennis Berardi, president of Kramer Guitars, French signed the Atlanta-based hard rock band Redd Threat. Over the next seven years, Redd Threat changed its name and personnel multiple times, and by 1995, the band was called Snake Nation. French later renamed the band Crawlspace.

French signed the band to Rebellion Music, and within a year, French signed a production deal with TVT Records. Due to trademark issues, Crawlspace changed its name to Sevendust. French and Mark Mendoza produced the self-titled debut album, and executive produced the following three Sevendust-albums. Sevendust became one of the biggest new breed of metal bands, called nu metal, and sold over 1 million albums.

=== 2000s ===
Sevendust and French parted ways in 2000. French then partnered with friend and former Sony Records executive Sean Sullivan, and founded a new management company called Rebellion Entertainment. The company signed artists representing a variety of musical styles, including New Jersey alternative metal band The Step Kings, south Asian pop artist Tina Sugandh, singer-songwriter Julian Velard, the Grammy-nominated Latin percussion group The Groove Collective and the alternative band and RCA recording artists The Sound of Urchin.

On June 10, French received the New Hampshire Excellence in Education award for "Efforts to Curb Substance abuse Among Young People".

In November 2001, Twisted Sister reunited following the 9/11 attacks on the World Trade Center for a November 2001 fundraiser, organized by Eddie Trunk, to benefit the Widows and Orphans Fund for the New York City police and fire departments.

The performance led to the band has performing for audiences worldwide, including United Kingdom, North America, European countries and South America. The band has also performed in South Korea at US army bases, through a USO-sponsored tour.

The band's activities included the creation and production of six new DVDs, two new albums, and a re-mastering of the entire catalog of previous releases, including re-recording in 2004 tracks from their 1984 Stay Hungry album under the new title Still Hungry, which includes the rock anthems "I Wanna Rock" and "We're Not Gonna Take It."

French signed with Razor & Tie for the 2006 release of the band's "A Twisted Xmas - Live In Las Vegas" on DVD, CD, and Digital Video/Audio. The songs "We're Not Gonna Take It" and "I Wanna Rock" have been featured in commercials, movies, and political and sporting events, including in a Super Bowl ad.

With the advent of iTunes and other online music services, Twisted Sister reestablished the band's ownership of its music.

In 2007, French and Twisted Sister were first year inductees of the Long island Music Hall of Fame.

French stated in 2018 current incarnations of Judas Priest and Foreigner were cover bands because most of their classic lineups were no longer involved. He compared them unfavorably to Twisted Sister, stating, "Every (Twisted Sister) show is perfect. Every show is the last show of our life. Every show is done with the sincerity and the heartfelt desire to make sure you walk out thinking that's the best thing you're ever gonna see."

In 2019, French announced his retirement following Twisted Sister's last live performance, which included an appearance by Kiss, in Monterrey, Mexico. French gifted his guitars to members of the band's road crew, saying, 'Guys, thank you. It's been great. See you later.' I never looked back." During his career with Twisted Sister, French estimates that he performed live with the band in more than 9,000 concert performances worldwide.

=== The Pinkburst Project ===
In 1996, French's daughter Samantha was diagnosed at age 6 with uveitis, a condition of the eye. In 2010, to raise money and awareness, French created The Pinkburst Project. The project collected 14 pink custom-made guitars crafted by brands that included Fender, Gibson, Gretsch and Martin.

At a benefit concert, “The Pinkburst Project: An Evening with Twisted Sister," the guitars were auctioned off. The auction and concert raised more than $110,000 for the Ocular Immunology and Uveitis Foundation for research, education and support for those affected by Uveitis and other inflammatory eye diseases.

=== Writing and speaking ===
French writes a business column for Inc.com titled "The French Connection."

He is also a motivational speaker at corporate and business conferences, including at an Inc. 500 conference.

He is a contributing editor to Goldmine magazine for a Beatles column titled "Now We're Sixty Four!"

He also writes a general music column titled "Twisted Systems" for the online music magazine Copper.

==== Book ====
A business memoir, Twisted Business: We're Not Gonna Take it Anymore, co-written with French by Extreme Leadership founder, leadership speaker and author Steve Farber, is set for release in 2021 by RosettaBooks.

== Personal life ==
French's first wife, Jodie Glickman, sang in the chorus on Twisted Sister's Live at Wacken: The Reunion album and is sister to the band's bass player, Mark Mendoza. French lives on the Upper West Side of Manhattan with his third wife Sharon Gitelle, whom he married in Las Vegas in 2016 after a 13-year courtship.

An avid runner, French has taken part in and completed two New York Marathons, in 1981 and 1986.
