= A. J. Pero =

American drummer (1959–2015)

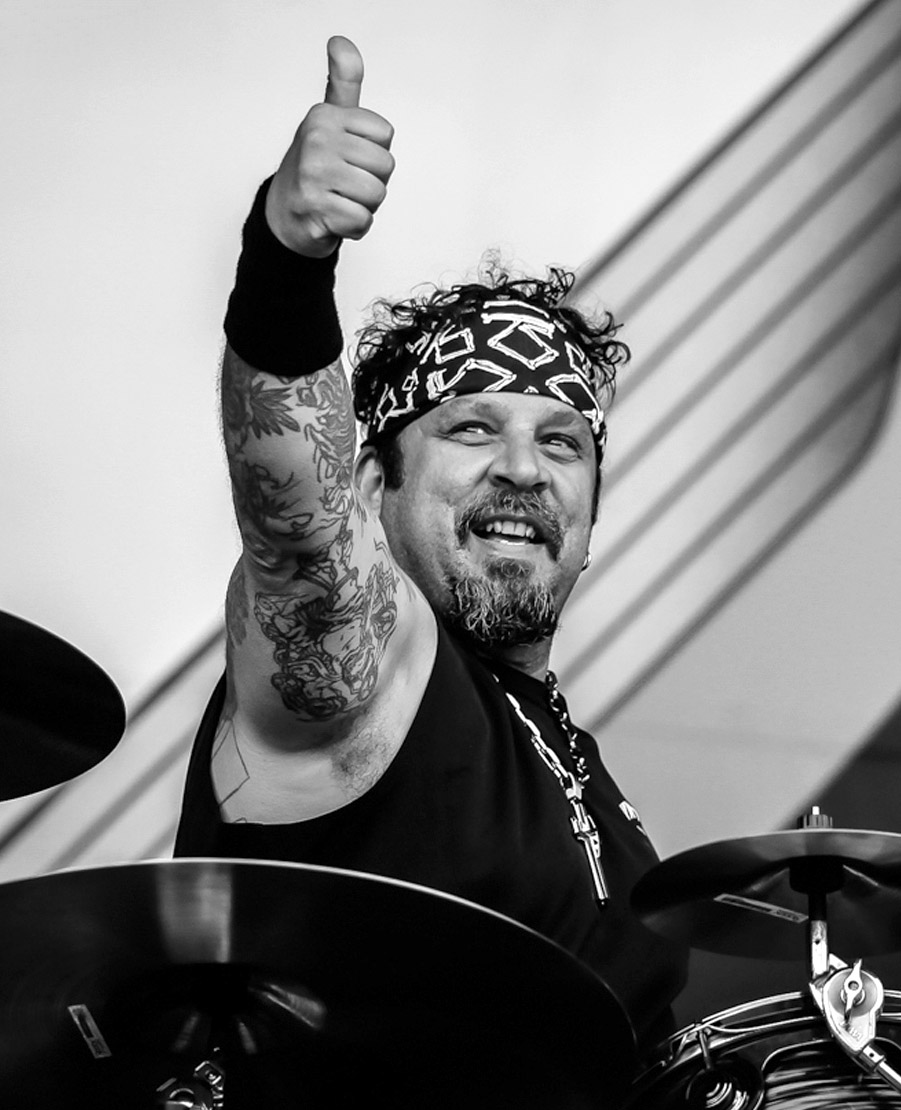

Background information
- Also known as: Tony Pero
- Born: Anthony Jude Pero; October 14, 1959; New York, New York, U.S.
- Died: March 20, 2015 (aged 55) Poughkeepsie, New York, U.S.
- Genres: Heavy metal
- Occupation: Drummer
- Years active: 1978–2015
- Formerly of: Twisted Sister, Adrenaline Mob, Four by Fate, Cities
- Spouse: Sonia Pero (m. 1989; div. 2013)

Anthony Jude Pero (October 14, 1959 – March 20, 2015) was an American drummer, known for his work with heavy metal bands Twisted Sister and Adrenaline Mob.

== Biography ==
Pero was born in the New York City borough of Staten Island. He attended New Dorp High School and graduated in 1977. He was initially a jazz drummer, later gravitating to heavier music akin to Rush and Led Zeppelin. Pero worked as a taxi driver for a time, and joined Cities, a local New York City band. He joined Twisted Sister in April 1982, after seeing them play at a club and being told that the group was in need of a drummer. Several years later, upon his departure from Twisted Sister in July 1986, he re-joined Cities. He participated in Twisted Sister's 1997 reunion and continued to perform with the band until his death. He was also a member of the Ozzy Osbourne cover band, No More Tears.

In 2007, Pero formed Circle Of Thorns with former Cities guitarist Steve Mironovich a.k.a. Steve Irons. In 2011, Pero played drums on a song titled "Elephant Man" on the Eric Carr CD Unfinished Business. On December 3, 2013, Pero was announced as the new drummer of the band Adrenaline Mob.

== Death ==
On March 20, 2015, Adrenaline Mob's band members and crew attempted but failed to wake Pero on their tour bus. The band was traveling from Baltimore to Poughkeepsie. Pero was taken to a hospital where he was declared dead from an apparent heart attack. In 2017, the band released their third studio album, We the People, containing Pero's last recording: a cover of Billy Idol's "Rebel Yell".
