= Mark Mendoza =

American bassist (born 1956)

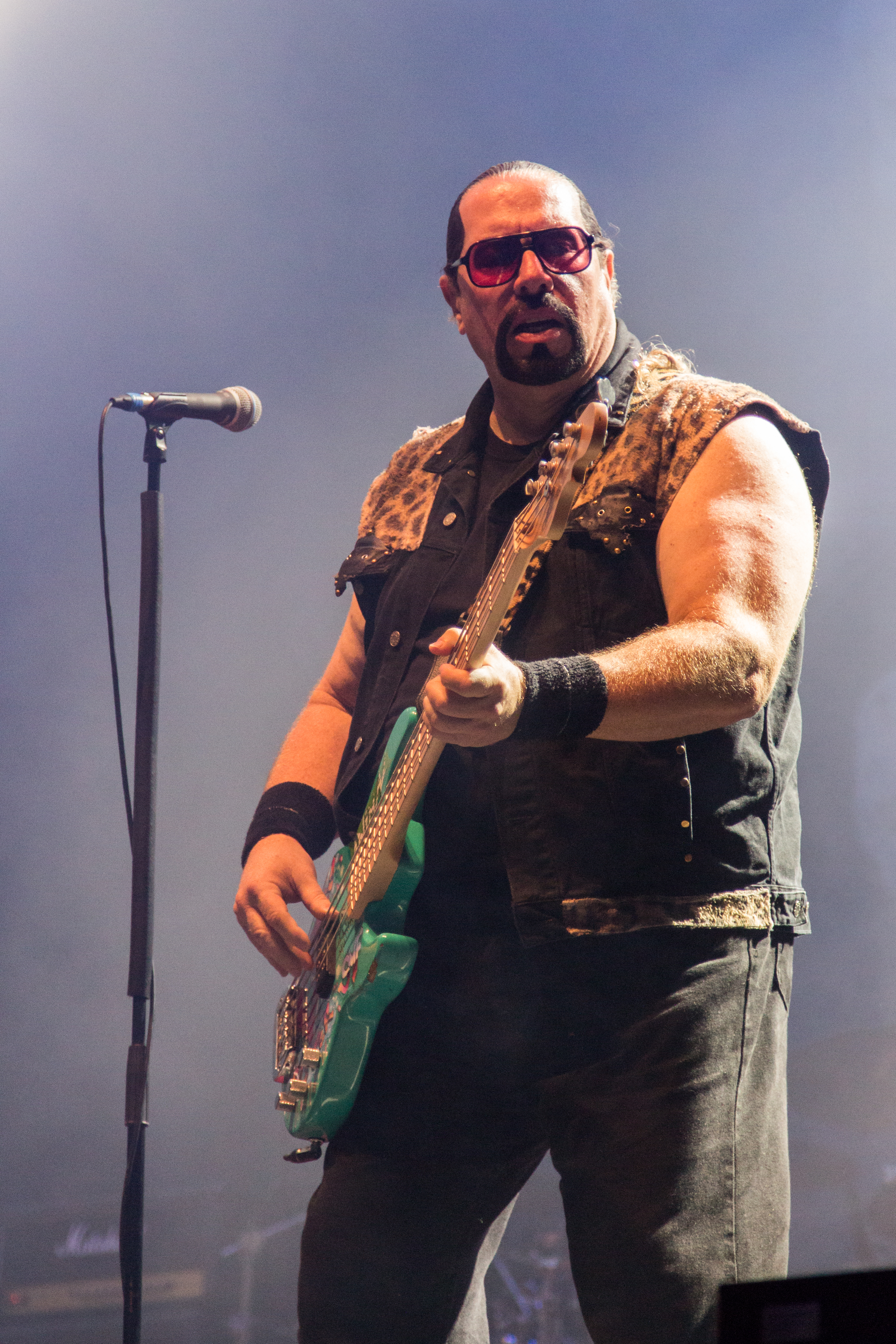
- Mendoza in 2014

Background information
- Born: Mark Glickman; July 13, 1956 (age 70)
- Origin: West Hempstead, New York, U.S.
- Genres: Heavy metal, punk rock, shock rock
- Occupation: Bassist
- Years active: 1976–2016, 2023-present
- Member of: Twisted Sister
- Formerly of: The Dictators, Blackfoot, Leslie West (project)
- Website: area22productions.com

Mark "The Animal" Mendoza (born Mark Glickman, July 13, 1956) is an American bassist and a former member of the heavy metal band Twisted Sister. He joined the band in 1978 after leaving the Dictators. He briefly played in Blackfoot in 1988 and with Leslie West projects. He is also a co-founder of Area 22 Productions where he hosts his weekly podcast 22 NOW.

Mendoza played the bass guitar on all of Twisted Sister's major label releases. He remixed Under the Blade when it was reissued by Atlantic Records, and produced and mixed Still Hungry and A Twisted Christmas.

On September 10, 2025, Twisted Sister frontman Dee Snider told radio host Eddie Trunk that Mendoza won't be joining the band on their newly announced 2026 reunion tour.

Growing up in West Hempstead, New York, Mark 'Mendoza' Glickman attended George Washington Middle School and West Hempstead High School and graduated in 1974.
