= List of Aerosmith members =

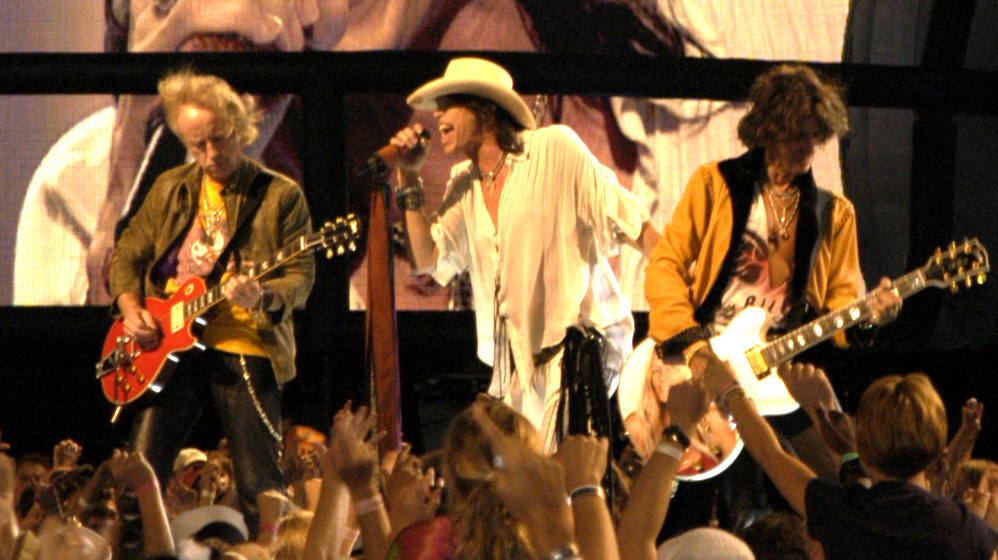
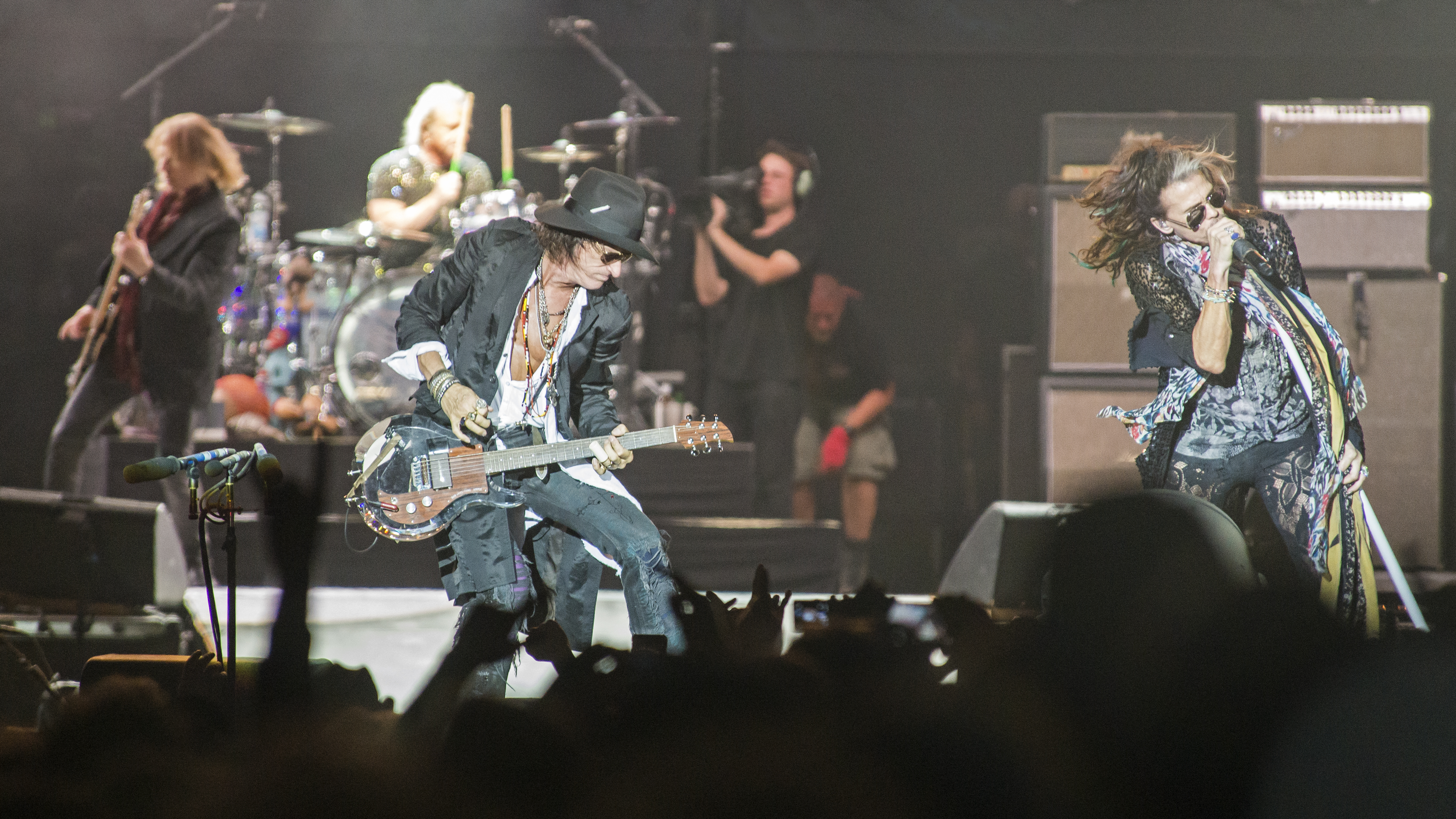
Aerosmith performing live in 2003 (top) and 2017 (bottom).

Aerosmith is an American hard rock band from Boston, Massachusetts. Formed in October 1970, the group originally included vocalist Steven Tyler, lead guitarist Joe Perry, rhythm guitarist Ray Tabano, bassist Tom Hamilton and drummer Joey Kramer, although Tabano was replaced by Brad Whitford early the following year. The band's lineup has remained constant for much of its tenure, save for a five-year period between 1979 and 1984. First, Perry left the band after a show on July 28, 1979, when a confrontation between his then-wife Elyssa and Hamilton's wife Terry led to an argument between the guitarist and Tyler, resulting in the former's departure. After contributing to Night in the Ruts as a session guitarist, Jimmy Crespo was invited to replace Perry in Aerosmith in October 1979. Whitford also left Aerosmith in 1981 to work on a solo project with former Ted Nugent singer Derek St. Holmes. He was replaced by Rick Dufay, before both Perry and Whitford returned to the band in the spring of 1984.

In addition to the band's regular five-piece lineup, Aerosmith has added several touring musicians since its inception. David Woodford performed saxophone on the band's 1973 self-titled album, and was added to its touring lineup for the subsequent promotional tour. Similarly, keyboardist Scott Cushnie performed on 1975's Toys in the Attic and remained for the album's touring cycle. Mark Radice briefly took on the role of touring keyboardist in early 1978, followed by frequent collaborator Richard Supa in 1980, Bobby Mayo between 1982 and 1983, and Clayton Bruce Ost in 1987. Thom Gimbel joined as Aerosmith's first long-term keyboardist in 1989, remaining with the band until 1995. He was replaced by Russ Irwin beginning with the Nine Lives Tour in 1997, who toured with the band until he was replaced by Buck Johnson in 2014. The 2012–2013 Global Warming Tour featured saxophonist Mindi Abair, percussionist Jesse Sky Kramer (Joey's son) and backing vocalist Melanie Taylor.

== Official members ==
=== Current members ===
Image	Name	Years active	Instruments	Release contributions
	Steven Tyler	1970–present	lead vocals; keyboards; harmonica; percussion	all Aerosmith releases
	Tom Hamilton	1970–present	bass, backing vocals	all Aerosmith releases
	Joey Kramer	1970–present	drums; percussion	all Aerosmith releases
	Joe Perry	1970–1979; 1984–present	guitar; backing and lead vocals	all Aerosmith releases except Rock in a Hard Place (1982)
	Brad Whitford	1971–1981; 1984–present	guitar, backing vocals	all Aerosmith releases except Rock in a Hard Place (1982) – one track only

=== Former members ===
Image	Name	Years active	Instruments	Release contributions
	Ray Tabano	1970–1971	guitar	none
	Jimmy Crespo	1979–1984	guitar; backing and additional vocals	Night in the Ruts (1979) – one track only; Rock in a Hard Place (1982)
	Rick Dufay	1981–1984	guitar	Rock in a Hard Place (1982); credit only; Music from Another Dimension! (2012) – one track only

== Other contributors ==
=== Session musicians ===
Image	Name	Years active	Instruments	Release contributions
	Steve Hunter	1973–1974	lead guitar	Get Your Wings (1974)
	Dick Wagner	1973–1974 (died 2014)	lead guitar	Get Your Wings (1974)
	Michael Brecker	1973–1974 (died 2007)	tenor saxophone	Get Your Wings (1974)
	Randy Brecker	1973–1974	trumpet	Get Your Wings (1974)
	Jon Pearson	1973–1974	trombone	Get Your Wings (1974)
	Stan Bronstein	1973–1974; 1977	saxophones	Get Your Wings (1974); Draw the Line (1977)
	Jay Messina	1975	bass marimba	Toys in the Attic (1975)
	Mike Mainieri	1975	conductor	Toys in the Attic (1975)
	Uncredited	1975	horn section	Toys in the Attic (1975)
	Paul Prestopino	1976; 1977; (died 2023)	banjo; acoustic guitar; banjo guitar	Rocks (1976), Draw the Line (1977)
	Jack Douglas	1976; 1977; 2011–2012	backing vocals; mandolin; percussion; keyboards; synthesizer; organ; piano	Rocks (1976); Draw the Line (1977); Rock in a Hard Place (1982); Music from Another Dimension! (2012)
	Karen Lawrence	1977	backing vocals	Draw the Line (1977)
	Mary Weiss	1979 (died 2024)	backing vocals	Night in the Ruts (1979)
	George Young	1979	alto saxophone	Night in the Ruts (1979)
	Louis del Gatto	1979	baritone saxophone	Night in the Ruts (1979)
	Lou Marini	1979	tenor saxophone	Night in the Ruts (1979)
	Barry Rogers	1979 (died 1991)	trombone	Night in the Ruts (1979)
	Neil Thompson	1979	guitar	Night in the Ruts (1979)
	Paul Harris	1981–1982	piano	Rock in a Hard Place (1982)
	John Turi	1981–1982	saxophone	Rock in a Hard Place (1982)
	Reinhard Straub	1981–1982	violin	Rock in a Hard Place (1982)
	John Lievano	1981–1982	acoustic guitar	Rock in a Hard Place (1982)
	Drew Arnott	1987	mellotron	Permanent Vacation (1987)
	Ian Putz	1987	baritone saxophone	Permanent Vacation (1987)
	Henry Christian	1987	trumpet	Permanent Vacation (1987)
	Scott Fairbairn	1987	cello	Permanent Vacation (1987)
	Mike Fraser	1987	plunger mute	Permanent Vacation (1987)
	Morgan Rael	1987	steel drums	Permanent Vacation (1987)
	Jim Vallance	1987	organ	Permanent Vacation (1987)
	Christine Arnott	1987	backing vocals	Permanent Vacation (1987)
	Bob Rogers	1987; 1992	trombone	Permanent Vacation (1987); Get a Grip (1993)
	Tom Keenlyside	1987; 1989; 1992	clarinet; saxophones; horn arrangements	Permanent Vacation (1987); Pump (1989); Get a Grip (1993)
	Bruce Fairbairn	1987; 1989; 1992; (died 1999)	trumpet; cello; backing vocals	Permanent Vacation (1987); Pump (1989); Get a Grip (1993)
	Bob Dowd	1989	backing vocals	Pump (1989)
	Catherine Epps	1989	voice	Pump (1989)
	Randy Raine-Reusch	1989	glass harmonica; Appalachian dulcimer; didgeridoo; Thai khaen; gourd mouth organ of the Lahu people of Northern Thailand	Pump (1989)
	Henry Christian	1989	brass instruments; saxophones	Pump (1989)
	Ian Putz	1989; 1992	brass instruments; saxophones	Pump (1989); Get a Grip (1993)
	John Webster	1989; 1992; 1996	keyboards; backing vocals	Pump (1989); Get a Grip (1993); Nine Lives (1997)
	Desmond Child	1992; 2011–2012	keyboards; piano	Get a Grip (1993); Music from Another Dimension! (2012)
	Paul Baron	1992	trumpet	Get a Grip (1993)
	Don Henley	1992	backing vocals	Get a Grip (1993)
	Lenny Kravitz	1992	backing vocals	Get a Grip (1993)
	Sandy Kanaeholo	1992	log drums	Get a Grip (1993)
	Melvin Liufau	1992	log drums	Get a Grip (1993)
	Wesey Mamea	1992	log drums	Get a Grip (1993)
	Liainaiala Tagaloa	1992	log drums	Get a Grip (1993)
	Mapuhi T. Tekurio	1992	log drums	Get a Grip (1993)
	Aladd Alationa Teofilo	1992	log drums	Get a Grip (1993)
	David Campbell	1992; 1996; 2000	arrangements; conductor	Get a Grip (1993); Nine Lives (1997); Just Push Play (2001)
	Ramesh Mishra	1996	sarangi	Nine Lives (1997)
	Suzie Katayama	1996	strings; conductor	Nine Lives (1997)
	Paul Santo	2000; 2003; 2011–2012	keyboards; Kurzweil; Hammond organ; piano; electric piano; organ	Just Push Play (2001); Honkin' on Bobo (2004); Music from Another Dimension! (2012)
	Tower of Power	2000	horns	Just Push Play (2001)
	Dan Higgins	2000	clarinet; saxophone	Just Push Play (2001)
	Chelsea Tyler	2000	backing vocals	Just Push Play (2001)
	Paul Caruso	2000 (died 2006)	loop programming	Just Push Play (2001)
	Liv Tyler	2000	whispering	Just Push Play (2001)
	Tony Perry	2000	scratching	Just Push Play (2001)
	Jim Cox	2000	piano	Just Push Play (2001)
	Johnnie Johnson	2003 (died 2005)	piano	Honkin' on Bobo (2004)
	Tracy Bonham	2003	vocals	Honkin' on Bobo (2004)
	The Memphis Horns	2003	brass	Honkin' on Bobo (2004)
	Julian Lennon	2011–2012	backing vocals	Music from Another Dimension! (2012)
	Sharlotte Gibson	2011–2012	backing vocals	Music from Another Dimension! (2012)
	Laura Jones	2011–2012	backing vocals	Music from Another Dimension! (2012)
	Mia Tyler	2011–2012	backing vocals	Music from Another Dimension! (2012)
	Johnny Depp	2011–2012	backing vocals	Music from Another Dimension! (2012)
	Bruce Witkin	2011–2012	backing vocals	Music from Another Dimension! (2012)
	Warren Huart	2011–2012	backing vocals	Music from Another Dimension! (2012)
	Marti Frederiksen	2011–2012	backing vocals; keyboards and guitar synthesizer	Music from Another Dimension! (2012)
	Tom Scott	2011–2012	tenor saxophone	Music from Another Dimension! (2012)
	Jessy J	2011–2012	tenor saxophone	Music from Another Dimension! (2012)
	John Mitchell	2011–2012	baritone saxophone	Music from Another Dimension! (2012)
	Bill Reichenbach Jr.	2011–2012	trombone	Music from Another Dimension! (2012)
	Gary Grant	2011–2012 (died 2024)	trumpet	Music from Another Dimension! (2012)
	Larry Hall	2011–2012	trumpet	Music from Another Dimension! (2012)
	Carrie Underwood	2011–2012	vocals	Music from Another Dimension! (2012)
	Dr. Rudy Tanzi	2011–2012	Hammond organ	Music from Another Dimension! (2012)
	Jesse Kotansky	2011–2012	violin	Music from Another Dimension! (2012)
	Daphne Chen	2011–2012	violin	Music from Another Dimension! (2012)
	Eric Gorfain	2011–2012	violin	Music from Another Dimension! (2012)
	Lauren Chipman	2011–2012	viola	Music from Another Dimension! (2012)
	Richard Dodd	2011–2012	cello	Music from Another Dimension! (2012)
	Zac Rae	2011–2012	piano; synthesizer; electric piano	Music from Another Dimension! (2012)
	Daniel J. Coe	2011–2012	synthesizer	Music from Another Dimension! (2012)
	Dan Potruch	2011–2012	percussion	Music from Another Dimension! (2012)

=== Touring musicians ===
Image	Name	Years active	Instruments	Release contributions
	David Woodford	1972–1973	saxophone	Aerosmith (1973) – two tracks only; Live! Bootleg (1978) – one track only
	Ray Colcord	1973–1974 (died 2016)	keyboards	Get Your Wings (1974) – three tracks only
	Scott Cushnie	1975; 1977	keyboards; piano	Toys in the Attic (1975) – two tracks only; Draw the Line (1977) – three tracks only
	Mark Radice	1978	keyboards; backing vocals	Live! Bootleg (1978); Live Texxas Jam '78 (1989)
	Richard Supa	1980	keyboards; backing vocals; additional guitars (sessions only)	Night in the Ruts (1979) – two tracks only; Get a Grip (1993) – one track only
	Bobby Mayo	1982–1983 (died 2004)	keyboards; backing vocals	none
	Clayton Bruce Ost	1987–1988	keyboards	none
	Thom Gimbel	1989–1995	keyboards; saxophone; percussion; backing vocals	A Little South of Sanity (1998)
	Russ Irwin	1997–2014	keyboards; piano; percussion; rhythm guitar; backing vocals	A Little South of Sanity (1998); You Gotta Move (2004); Rockin' the Joint (2005); Music from Another Dimension! (2012) – two tracks only; Rock for the Rising Sun (2013)
	Jesse Sky Kramer	2005 (substitute); 2012–2013; 2014 (substitute)	percussion; additional drums (session only); drums (substitute only)	Music from Another Dimension! (2012) – one track only; Kramer has also substituted for his father at shows in 2005 and 2014 due to surgery recovery and illness.
	Mindi Abair	2012	saxophone	none
	Melanie Taylor	2012	backing vocals	Music from Another Dimension! (2012) – two tracks only
	Buck Johnson	2014–2024	keyboards; piano; rhythm guitar; backing vocals	Aerosmith Rocks Donington 2014 (2015)

=== Live substitutes ===
Image	Name	Years active	Instruments	Notes
	David Minehan	1994	guitar	Minehan substituted for Whitford, who was grieving a family member's death, on a Japanese tour in 1994.
	David Hull	2006; 2009; 2013	bass	Hull substituted for Hamilton at shows in 2006, 2009 and 2013 due to illness and cancer treatment.
	Bobby Schneck	2009	guitar	Schneck substituted for Whitford, who was recovering from surgery, at shows in June and July 2009.
	John Douglas	2019–2020; 2022–2024	drums	Douglas substituted for Kramer during the band's Las Vegas residency in 2019, while Kramer was injured.

== Lineups ==
Period	Members	Studio releases
October 1970 – April 1971	Steven Tyler – lead vocals, harmonica, percussion, keyboards; Joe Perry – lead guitar, backing vocals; Ray Tabano – rhythm guitar; Tom Hamilton – bass; Joey Kramer – drums, percussion	none
April 1971 – July 1979	Steven Tyler – lead vocals, harmonica, percussion keyboards; Joe Perry – lead and rhythm guitar, backing vocals; Tom Hamilton – bass; Joey Kramer – drums, percussion; Brad Whitford – rhythm and lead guitar	Aerosmith (1973); Get Your Wings (1974); Toys in the Attic (1975); Rocks (1976); Draw the Line (1977); Night in the Ruts (1979)
October 1979 – July 1981	Steven Tyler – lead vocals, harmonica, percussion, keyboards; Tom Hamilton – bass; Joey Kramer – drums, percussion; Brad Whitford – rhythm and lead guitar; Jimmy Crespo – lead and rhythm guitar, backing vocals	Rock in a Hard Place (1982) - one track only
July 1981 – May 1984	Steven Tyler – lead vocals, harmonica, percussion, keyboards; Tom Hamilton – bass; Joey Kramer – drums, percussion; Jimmy Crespo – lead and rhythm guitar, backing vocals; Rick Dufay – rhythm and lead guitar	Rock in a Hard Place (1982)
May 1984 – present	Steven Tyler – lead vocals, harmonica, percussion, keyboards; Tom Hamilton – bass; Joey Kramer – drums, percussion; Brad Whitford – rhythm and lead guitar; Joe Perry – lead and rhythm guitar, backing vocals	Done with Mirrors (1985); Permanent Vacation (1987); Pump (1989); Get a Grip (1993); Nine Lives (1997); Just Push Play (2001); Honkin' on Bobo (2004); Music from Another Dimension! (2012)

== Bibliography ==
- Bienstock, Richard (September 1, 2011), Aerosmith: The Ultimate Illustrated History of the Boston Bad Boys, Minneapolis, Minnesota: Voyageur Press, ISBN 978-0760341063
