= Sophisticated Boom Boom (disambiguation) =

Sophisticated Boom Boom is the 1984 debut album by Dead or Alive.

Sophisticated Boom Boom may also refer to:

- "Sophisticated Boom Boom", a song by the Shangri-Las released in 1965 on their album Shangri-Las-65!
- Sophisticated Boom Boom (band), a Scottish band
- Sophisticated Boom Boom, a 2003 book by John Kelly
- Sophisticated Boom Boom: The Shadow Morton Story, a 2013 compilation album of songs composed or produced by Shadow Morton
