= Video Scrapbook =

Video by Aerosmith
- Released: October 29, 1987
- Genre: Hard rock
- Length: 54 mins
- Label: CBS/Fox Video
- Director: Hart Perry
- Producer: David Krebs and Steven Leber

Aerosmith video chronology
Video Scrapbook (1987)	Permanent Vacation 3x5 (1988)

Professional ratings
Review scores
Source	Rating
AllMusic	2/5 stars

Video Scrapbook is a video by American rock band Aerosmith, featuring live footage, promotional videos, and conversations between the band and their families. It was released on VHS and Betamax in 1987 and LaserDisc in 1990. There has yet to be a DVD release. In February 1988 the RIAA certified the release as Gold (Longform video).

"I can dance better now than I did back then because I was so stoned," singer Steven Tyler reflected in 1994. "I've watched the 'Sweet Emotion' footage where I just stood there because I was gacked up to the nines."

== Track listing ==
1. "Toys In The Attic (Live at Pontiac Silverdome 1976)"
2. "Same Old Song and Dance (Live at Pontiac Silverdome 1976)"
3. "Chip Away the Stone (Live at Capital Center - Largo, MD 1978)"
4. "Draw The Line (Live at California Jam 2 1978)"
5. "Dream On"
6. "Sweet Emotion (Live at Pontiac Silverdome 1976)"
7. "Chiquita (Music Video)"
8. "Lightning Strikes (Music Video)"
9. "Walk This Way (Live at Pontiac Silverdome 1976)"
10. "Adam's Apple" (Live at Pontiac Silverdome 1976)"
11. "Train Kept A Rollin' (Live at Pontiac Silverdome 1976)"
12. "SOS (Unlisted Track) (Live at Pontiac Silverdome 1976)"

== Personnel ==
- Tom Hamilton
- Joey Kramer
- Joe Perry
- Steven Tyler
- Brad Whitford
- Jimmy Crespo
- Rick Dufay

== Certifications ==
Region	Certification	Certified units/sales
United States (RIAA)	Gold	50,000^{^}
^{^} Shipments figures based on certification alone.
