= Come Out and Play (Twisted Sister album) =

Studio album by Twisted Sister
- Released: November 22, 1985
- Recorded: 1985
- Studios: The Hit Factory, New York City and Los Angeles
- Genres: Heavy metal; glam metal
- Length: 39:38
- Label: Atlantic
- Producer: Dieter Dierks

Twisted Sister chronology
Stay Hungry (1984)	Come Out and Play (1985)	Love Is for Suckers (1987)

Singles from Come Out and Play
- 1. "Leader of the Pack" Released: November 1985; 2. "Come Out and Play" Released: February 1986; 3. "Be Chrool to Your Scuel" Released: 1986 (EU)

Professional ratings
Review scores
Source	Rating
AllMusic	3/5 stars
Collector's Guide to Heavy Metal	4/10

Come Out and Play is the fourth studio album by American heavy metal band Twisted Sister, released by Atlantic Records on November 22, 1985. The album was significantly less successful than its predecessor Stay Hungry (1984), both critically and commercially, although it achieved Gold status by selling more than 500,000 copies.

== Overview ==
Following the massive success of 1984's Stay Hungry, which established Twisted Sister as one of the world's top recording acts, the band was faced with the question of whether they should continue in the same MTV and radio-friendly direction that brought them so much success, or return to their heavy metal roots. Come Out and Play saw them attempt to do both, but the approach ultimately proved devastatingly unsuccessful and the album marked the beginning of the band's commercial decline.

The band's decision to record a cover of the 1964 Shangri-Las' hit "Leader of the Pack" and release it as the album's first single proved very unpopular with the band's fanbase. Ultimately, neither "Leader of the Pack" nor second single "Be Chrool To Your Scuel" (featuring guest appearances from Alice Cooper, Brian Setzer, Clarence Clemons, and Billy Joel) came close to matching the success of "We're Not Gonna Take It" or "I Wanna Rock" from 1984's Stay Hungry.

The 1986 world tour in support of Come Out and Play was marked by poor attendance and ticket sales so low in some cities that several shows were canceled. Longtime drummer A.J. Pero left the band following the tour in 1986, contributing to the chaos that eventually saw Twisted Sister disband in 1988.

The music videos for "Leader of the Pack" and "Be Chrool to Your School" followed the same comedic formula that had been so successful for the band in the Stay Hungry era. The latter single, featuring a prominent guest spot by Dee Snider's hero Alice Cooper, was banned by MTV on the grounds that it was offensive. The band didn't produce a video for the album's second and final US single, "You Want What We Got".

In 1986 the band released the Come Out and Play: The Videos home video on VHS, which included four videos ("We're Not Gonna Take It", "I Wanna Rock", "Leader of the Pack" and "Be Chrool to Your Scuel") tied together by scenes of Snider in a scrapyard being visited by troubled teens seeking advice, to the tune of the song "Come Out and Play". This home video has never been re-issued on DVD.

The intro to the title track features an homage to the 1979 cult classic movie The Warriors, in which the main villain, Luther, chants "Warriors, come out to play".

== Track listing ==
All tracks are written by Dee Snider, except "Leader of the Pack" by Ellie Greenwich, Shadow Morton, Jeff Barry.

Side one
No.	Title	Length
1.	"Come Out and Play"	4:51
2.	"Leader of the Pack" (The Shangri-Las cover)	3:48
3.	"You Want What We Got"	3:45
4.	"I Believe in Rock 'n' Roll"	4:03
5.	"The Fire Still Burns"	3:34
Total length:		20:01

Side two
No.	Title	Length
6.	"Be Chrool to Your Scuel" (featuring Alice Cooper)	3:53
7.	"I Believe in You"	5:23
8.	"Out on the Streets"	4:27
9.	"Lookin' Out for #1"	3:07
10.	"Kill or Be Killed"	2:47
Total length:		19:37

Cassette and CD versions bonus track
No.	Title	Length
11.	"King of the Fools"	6:26
Total length:		46:04

== Personnel ==
=== Twisted Sister ===
- Dee Snider – lead vocals, backing vocals
- Eddie "Fingers" Ojeda – lead & rhythm guitars, backing vocals
- Jay Jay French – rhythm & lead guitars, backing vocals
- Mark "The Animal" Mendoza – bass, backing vocals
- A. J. Pero – drums, percussion, backing vocals

=== Additional musicians ===
- Alan St. Jon – keyboards
- Don Dokken, Gary Holland – backing vocals
- Alice Cooper – co-lead vocals on "Be Chrool to Your Scuel"
- Brian Setzer – guitar solo on "Be Chrool to Your Scuel"
- Billy Joel – piano on "Be Chrool to Your Scuel"
- Clarence Clemons – saxophone solo on "Be Chrool to Your Scuel"
- The Uptown Horns:
  - Crispin Cioe – baritone saxophone on "Be Chrool to Your Scuel"
  - Arno "Cool-Ray" Hecht – tenor saxophone on "Be Chrool to Your Scuel"
  - "Bad" Bob Funk – trombone on "Be Chrool to Your Scuel"
  - "Hollywood" Paul Litteral – trumpet on "Be Chrool to Your Scuel"
- Julia Waters, Maxine Waters – backing vocals on "Be Chrool to Your Scuel"

=== Production ===
- Dieter Dierks – producer, LP audio mastering
- Eddy Delana – sound engineer
- Craig Engel – assistant engineer in Los Angeles
- Craig Vogel – assistant engineer in New York
- Bob Ludwig – LP audio mastering
- Mikael Kirke – art director
- Mark Weiss – art director, photographer
- Barry Diament – CD audio mastering

=== Video guest stars ===
The following people appeared only in the official video for "Be Chrool to Your Scuel":

- The comedian Bobcat Goldthwait
- The make-up artist Tom Savini
- Actor Luke Perry

== Charts ==
Chart (1985–86)	Peak position
Australian Albums (Kent Music Report)	56
Canada Top Albums/CDs (RPM)	36
Finnish Albums (The Official Finnish Charts)	4
Norwegian Albums (VG-lista)	11
Swedish Albums (Sverigetopplistan)	10
UK Albums (Official Charts)	95
US Billboard 200	53

== Certifications ==
Region	Certification	Certified units/sales
Finland (Musiikkituottajat)	Gold	25,000
Sweden (GLF)	Gold	50,000^{^}
United States (RIAA)	Gold	500,000^{^}
^{^} Shipments figures based on certification alone.
