= Leader of the Pack (album) =

Studio album by the Shangri-Las
- Released: February 1965
- Genre: Pop; R&B
- Length: 28:18
- Label: Red Bird
- Producer: George "Shadow" Morton

The Shangri-Las chronology
Leader of the Pack (1965)	Shangri-Las-65! (1965)

Singles from Leader of the Pack
- 1. "Remember (Walking in the Sand)" Released: August 1964; 2. "Leader of the Pack" Released: September 1964; 3. "Give Him a Great Big Kiss" Released: December 1964; 4. "Maybe" Released: December 1964

Leader of the Pack is the debut album by girl group the Shangri-Las, released in 1965 by Red Bird Records. The album was produced to capitalize on the group's breakthrough hits "Remember (Walking in the Sand)" and "Leader of the Pack", the latter of which had been co-written by Jeff Barry and Ellie Greenwich in addition to George "Shadow" Morton. After the album's focal track went to number one, the Shangri-Las' style and image had evolved into something tougher and earthier.

Much of the material for Leader of the Pack such as "Bull Dog" and "It's Easier to Cry" emphasized their new style. Other songs on the album include cover versions of "Maybe" originally by the Chantels with Betty Weiss on lead vocals, along with "Shout" by the Isley Brothers and "Twist and Shout" by the Top Notes. Also on the album is "Give Him a Great Big Kiss", which the Shangri-Las had released as a single in December 1964. Although the group had scored two major hits, the album only charted at 109 on the U.S. albums chart.

The songs "Leader of the Pack", "Give Him a Great Big Kiss" and "Remember (Walking in the Sand)" have been cited as important influences on musicians such as the New York Dolls, the Damned, the Jesus and Mary Chain, Sonic Youth and Amy Winehouse.

== Critical reception ==
Professional ratings
Review scores
Source	Rating
The Encyclopedia of Popular Music	3/5 stars
Record Mirror	4/5 stars

In a contemporary review, Record Mirror wrote that Leader of the Pack was "one of the most interesting albums we've heard for a long time" and that it "proves that the girls CAN sing well without seagulls or motorcycles" (a reference to the sounds heard on their first two hit singles). In 2017, it was rated the 49th best album of the 1960s by Pitchfork. In 2024, it was ranked 247th best album of all time by Paste magazine.

== Track listing ==
Side one

1. "Give Him a Great Big Kiss" (George Morton) – 2:12
2. "Leader of the Pack" (Morton, Jeff Barry, Ellie Greenwich) – 2:48
3. "Bull Dog" (Jerry Leiber, Mike Stoller) – 2:22
4. "It's Easier to Cry" (J. J. Jackson, Joe DeAngelis, Robert Steinberg) – 2:35
5. "What Is Love" (Morton, Tony Michaels) – 2:55
6. "Remember (Walking in the Sand)" (Morton) – 2:18

Side two

7. "Twist and Shout" (Phil Medley, Bert Russell) – 2:39
8. "Maybe" (Arlene Smith, Richard Barrett) – 2:40
9. "So Much in Love" (Billy Jackson, Roy Straigis) – 2:16
10. "Shout" (Rudolph Isley, Ronald Isley, O'Kelly Isley, Jr.) – 2:10
11. "Good Night, My Love, Pleasant Dreams" (George Motola, John Marascalco) – 1:15
12. "You Can't Sit Down" (Cornell Muldrow, Dee Clark) – 2:18

== Personnel ==
The Shangri-Las

- Mary Weiss – lead and backing vocals
- Betty Weiss – lead and backing vocals
- Marge Ganser – backing vocals
- Mary Ann Ganser – backing vocals

Additional personnel

- Shadow Morton – producer
- Artie Butler – arranger
- Brooks Arthur – engineer
- Rod McBrien – engineer
- Loring Eutemey – artwork
- Hugh Bell – cover photography

== Singles history ==
- "Remember (Walking in the Sand)" b/w "It's Easier To Cry" (U.S. No. 5, UK No. 14)
- "Leader of the Pack" b/w "What Is Love?" (U.S. No. 1, UK No. 11 (1965), UK No. 3 (1972), UK No. 7 (1976)
- "Give Him a Great Big Kiss" b/w "Twist and Shout" (U.S. No. 18)
- "Maybe" b/w "Shout" (U.S. No. 91)
