= Bitch's Brew =

1982 single by Aerosmith

Single by Aerosmith

from the album Rock in a Hard Place
- Released: December 1982
- Recorded: 1982
- Studio: Power Station, New York City; Criteria, Miami
- Genre: Hard rock
- Length: 4:14
- Label: Columbia
- Songwriters: Steven Tyler; Jimmy Crespo
- Producers: Jack Douglas; Steven Tyler; Tony Bongiovi

Aerosmith singles chronology
| "Lightning Strikes" (1982) | "Bitch's Brew" (1982) | "Let the Music Do the Talking" (1985) |

"Bitch's Brew" is a song from hard rock band Aerosmith's seventh studio album, Rock in a Hard Place. It was the third track and the second single taken from the album. The single was released as a 12-inch vinyl for promotional purposes. It was the band's last single to be released by Columbia Records until 1997's Nine Lives.

== Track listing ==
- 12" vinyl (promo):
1. "Bitch's Brew" - 4:14

== Personnel ==
- Steven Tyler - lead vocals, harmonica
- Tom Hamilton - bass
- Joey Kramer - drums
- Jimmy Crespo - lead guitar, rhythm guitar additional vocals on "Bitches Brew"

Other personnel

- Jack Douglas - producer
- Steven Tyler - producer
- Tony Bongiovi - producer
