= Remember (Walking in the Sand) =

Song by The Shangri-Las

- Japanese picture sleeve

Single by the Shangri-Las

from the album Leader of the Pack
- B-side: "It's Easier to Cry"
- Released: August 1964
- Recorded: July 1964
- Studio: Mira Sound, New York City
- Genre: Pop
- Length: 2:17
- Label: Red Bird
- Songwriter: George Morton
- Producers: Artie Ripp, Jeff Barry

The Shangri-Las singles chronology
"Wishing Well" (1964)	"Remember (Walking in the Sand)" (1964)	"Leader of the Pack" (1964)

Official audio
- "Remember (Walkin' In The Sand)" on YouTube

"Remember (Walking in the Sand)", also known as "Remember", is a song written by George "Shadow" Morton. It was originally recorded by the girl group the Shangri-Las, who had a top five hit with it in 1964, their first hit single. A remake by Aerosmith in 1979 was a minor hit. There have been many other versions of the song as well.

== The Shangri-Las' original version ==
=== Background ===
Shadow Morton was looking to break into the music business, and went to the Brill Building in New York City to see an old friend, Ellie Greenwich, who had become a successful pop songwriter. Morton and Greenwich's songwriting partner (and husband) Jeff Barry took a dislike to one another. Asked what he did for a living, Morton replied "I write songs", although he had never written one. When Barry asked him what kind, Morton retorted, "Hit songs!" Barry said he would love to hear one of Morton's tunes, and invited him to come back the following week with something.

Morton hired the Shangri-Las, a teenage group from Queens, New York, to sing. Realizing that he did not have a song yet, he immediately wrote "Remember (Walking in the Sand)". There are several stories as to how it was written. One is that immediately upon his realization of not having a song, he parked next to a beach on Long Island and there wrote the song. The song contains recurring seagulls-and-surf sound effects. He used the Shangri-Las on the demo, which he produced. (Morton reports Billy Joel, then an unknown studio musician, played the piano chords that open the song.) Jeff Barry was impressed and Red Bird Records picked up the song for release and signed Morton and the Shangri-Las to contracts. According to some accounts, the original version was nearly seven minutes long. In order to fit the AM radio format of the time, the song had to be cut in length, but rather than edit it, Morton simply faded it out after 2:10. In another version, Morton presented the demo to various Red Bird staffers, Jeff Barry, Ellie Greenwich, Artie Butler and others. They and some session musicians then took the demo into the studio where it became "a whole other record."

=== Reception ===
The song was released as the third single by the Shangri-Las, their first on Red Bird Records, and became a number five hit on the Billboard Hot 100, and number nine on the Cashbox R&B chart. It hit number 14 on the UK Singles Chart and became more successful in the UK when reissued on several occasions in the 1970s.

Cash Box described it as "a hauntingly plaintive pop-r&b romancer with an off-beat rapidly-changing, hard-shufflin' beat."

The Shangri-Las' recording placed number 395 on Rolling Stone's 500 Greatest Songs of All Time list in 2004. Billboard magazine named the song number 26 on its list of 100 Greatest Girl Group Songs of All Time.

In the early 1970s, Buddah Records released a "Radio Active Gold" oldies 45 containing an undubbed version of the demo (no echo or sound effects). This version is timed at 2:17, and the intro is the "Remember..." chorus without Mary Weiss' lead vocal. This version (the technical term for it is an underdub) first appeared on a 1969 Buddah compilation album titled Incense and Oldies, along with an alternate version of "Give Him a Great Big Kiss".

== Personnel ==
According to musicologist Albin J. Zak:

The Shangri-Las

- Mary Weiss – lead vocal
- Marge Ganser – backing vocal
- Mary Ann Ganser – backing vocal
- Betty Weiss – backing vocal

Additional musicians and production

- Unidentified session musicians – bass guitar, drums, piano (Note: Musician Billy Joel played piano on Morton's demo recording of the song, and Morton later suggested that part of Joel's piano contribution was retained on the opening of the final recording. Zak instead attributes the instrument to an unidentified studio musician.)
- Unidentified – finger snaps, handclaps, sound effects
- Brooks Arthur – engineering
- Jeff Barry – producer
- Shadow Morton – producer (uncredited)
- Artie Ripp – producer (credited but disputed)

== Chart history ==
=== Weekly charts ===
Chart (1964)	Peak position
Canada RPM Top Singles	2
New Zealand (Lever Hit Parade)	4
UK Singles (OCC)	14
U.S. Billboard Hot 100	5
U.S. Cash Box R&B	9
U.S. Cash Box Top 100	5
U.S. Record World	4

=== Year-end charts ===
Chart (1964)	Rank
U.S. Billboard Hot 100	53
U.S. Cash Box	67

== Aerosmith version ==
"Remember (Walking in the Sand)"

Single by Aerosmith

from the album Night in the Ruts
- B-side: "Bone to Bone"
- Released: December 11, 1979
- Recorded: 1979
- Genre: Blues rock, hard rock
- Length: 4:04
- Label: Columbia
- Songwriter: George Morton
- Producers: Aerosmith, Gary Lyons

Aerosmith singles chronology
"Chip Away the Stone" (1978)	"Remember (Walking in the Sand)" (1979)	"Bitch's Brew" (1982)

Aerosmith released a rock-oriented version of the song, featuring uncredited backing vocals by Mary Weiss of the Shangri-Las as a single in 1979. Released on Columbia Records it was taken from the group's sixth studio album Night in the Ruts and was also included on their Greatest Hits album. Aerosmith's cover was co-produced by Gary Lyons. It charted on the Billboard Hot 100 at number 67. It also peaked at number 29 on the Canadian RPM singles chart in March 1980.

== Other notable versions ==
In 1979, Louise Goffin released a remake of the song on her debut album Kid Blue. That version reached number 43 on the Billboard Hot 100.

The Go-Go's have frequently performed the song live, starting in 1981.

In 2010 Irish singer, Imelda May sang the vocals on the Jeff Beck tribute to Les Paul Rock 'n' Roll Party (Honoring Les Paul) recorded live at the Iridium Theater, New York, on June 9, 2010.

In 2011, English singer Hollie Cook covered the song on her self-titled debut reggae album, Hollie Cook, produced by Prince Fatty. Cook's version, titled "Walking in the Sand", was characterized by music critics as "optimistic" and "uplifting", with AllMusic remarking that her rendition "layers the doo wop classic with baritone brass hooks and roots reggae riddims".

== In popular culture ==
The song was featured in Martin Scorsese's Goodfellas (1990), as well as the soundtrack release for the film.

The bridge of the Beatles' 1995 single "Free as a Bird", with its similar lyric "Whatever happened to the life we once knew?", pays homage to the song.

In 2005, American rapper Capone sampled the song and pitched it up 5 semitones for "Streets Favorite" (often mislabeled with the song title "Oh No"), a track from his 2005 album Pain, Time, & Glory. In 2020, a version titled "Oh No", by rapper Kreepa, which used the instrumental of "Streets Favorite", became an internet meme on TikTok, typically being played when an accident is shown, with over 10 million videos using that sound.

Amy Winehouse covered part of the pre-chorus when singing "Back to Black" during live shows.
