= Mars Arizona =

American country band

- Origin: San Francisco
- Genres: Alternative country
- Years active: 2002–2010
- Labels: Big Barn Records
- Members: Paul Knowles, Nicole Storto

Mars Arizona was a San Francisco-based alternative country band active in the 2000s. The band's two core members were Paul Knowles and Nicole Storto. They released four studio albums, all on Big Barn Records.

== History ==
Knowles, who is the son of a Baptist preacher and who grew up in Morristown, Tennessee, met Storto, a former tennis star at San Diego State University, at a record store in Tempe, Arizona in 1997. They then moved to Sedona. After recording demos for a few years, they moved to Chicago because they viewed it as a "music town", where they premiered their act, originally called "Drowning Noah," in 1999. After changing their name to Mars Arizona in 2000, they released an album called "Mars Arizona" later the same year, as an MP3, a name which they chose to reference the otherworldly appearance of Northern Arizona. Their decision to change their band's name was made after a woman from Texas drowned both her children—one of whom was named Noah—so Knowles and Storto wouldn't be perceived as "making light of a tragedy."

Their debut album as Mars Arizona, Love Songs for the Apocalypse, was released on November 12, 2002. Knowles joked that, in making the album, one of his and Storto's goals was "to get all ‘one star’ reviews in every music magazine in the country." Nevertheless, Stephen Haag of PopMatters wrote that the album "...isn’t a one star album—accomplishing that feat usually requires mountains of cocaine (hello, Aerosmith’s Rock in a Hard Place!)—but rather a safe, pleasant enough, middle of the road album."

For their second album, All Over the Road, the duo recruited drummer Kenny Aronoff, who was previously known for his work with John Mellencamp. They recorded the album in the Bay Area cities of Mill Valley and Cotati, California. After the album was released on July 12, 2005, it received a favorable review from Country Standard Time's Andy Turner, who concluded that it was "a non-flashy, smartly done effort well worth checking out." Robert Christgau also reviewed the album, labeling "Elvis Presley Blues", which is a cover of a Gillian Welch song, a "choice cut". This rating indicates that, according to Christgau, only certain songs—the "choice cut(s)"—on the album are good, but that the rest of the album "isn't worth your time or money." It was also reviewed by Rick Cornell for the magazine No Depression, who noted that the album "is largely about loss and recovery," describing it as "an eclectic mix, from the rocked-up honky-tonk of the title track (a tribute to Mike Flannagan, a late Knoxville DJ whose radio show gives the album its title) to the half-classic-country/half-folk feel of “Streets Of Milwaukee” to the keyboard-pop leanings of the closing pair “Goodbye Peace” and “Good Morning”. Other moderately favorable reviews came from J. Poet of AllMusic, who awarded the album 3 1/2 stars out of 5, and Noel Murray, who wrote that on the song "He Broke Your Heart," "sweetly buzzing guitar counteracts Knowles' bitter words." Murray also wrote that "If Mars Arizona stays the course, the band could rival its down-the-coast neighbor Limbeck, which over five years and three LPs has become one of the brightest hopes for roots-rock."

Their third album, Hello Cruel World, was released on January 15, 2008 and, like their previous album, includes appearances by several famous musicians. This time, these musicians included David Grisman, Al Perkins, and Billy Block. Knowles attributed some of the album's positive critical reception to the appearance of these well-known musicians. The band toured in support of it soon after its release, playing at, among other places, "Muddy Waters" in Santa Barbara, California. In an interview, Knowles said it was influenced by "Northern California and Nashville--not traditional, but underground Nashville." Soon after its release, the album rose to #32 on the Americana Music Association's AMA Radio Chart. Like All Over the Road, Hello Cruel World was reviewed in No Depression, where Greg Yost wrote that, on the album, the band "manages to find the proverbial silver lining of good music while also conveying an overall sense of global disillusionment." Also like All Over the Road, it received a 3.5 star review from AllMusic's J. Poet.

Their fourth and final album, High Desert, was released on May 18, 2010. As with all of Mars Arizona's previous albums, AllMusic's J. Poet reviewed this album, which he again gave a rating of 3.5 out of 5 stars. J. Poet also reviewed the album favorably in the newspaper East Bay Express, in which he described it as "still country, albeit an evolved form" and described "Jesus Ain't Coming Back" as an album highlight.

On April 9, 2013, Knowles and Storto released their first album under their new moniker, New American Farmers, entitled "Brand New Day". They released their second album under this moniker, The Farmacology Sessions, the following year.

== Discography ==
=== As Mars Arizona ===
- Mars Arizona (MP3, 2000)
- Love Songs for the Apocalypse (Big Barn, 2002)
- All Over the Road (Big Barn, 2005)
- Hello Cruel World (Big Barn, 2008)
- High Desert (Big Barn, 2010)

=== As New American Farmers ===
- Brand New Day (Big Barncat, 2013)
- The Farmacology Sessions (Big Barncat, 2014)
