= Night in the Ruts =

Studio album by Aerosmith
- Released: November 16, 1979
- Recorded: Mid-1979
- Studios: Mediasound, New York City; Record Plant, New York City
- Genres: Hard rock; blues rock
- Length: 35:41
- Label: Columbia
- Producers: Gary Lyons; Aerosmith

Aerosmith chronology
| Draw the Line (1977) | Night in the Ruts (1979) | Rock in a Hard Place (1982) |

Singles from Night in the Ruts
- 1. "Remember (Walking in the Sand)" Released: 11 December 1979

Night in the Ruts is the sixth studio album by American rock band Aerosmith, released on November 16, 1979, by Columbia Records. Guitarist Joe Perry left the band midway through the album's recording.

The album was initially produced at the band's Wherehouse rehearsal space by Jack Douglas, who'd produced Aerosmith's previous four albums, but later Columbia Records brought in Gary Lyons to replace Douglas as producer.

== Background ==
Development for the album began in the spring of 1979, but right from the beginning, there were setbacks. Hampered by rampant drug use, vocalist Steven Tyler had difficulty completing lyrics and vocals. Bassist Tom Hamilton recalled: "We worked on the album, but we couldn't finish it. It was supposed to come out in June and be called Off Your Rocker, but there were no lyrics. It was a big crisis." The band members were also in dire financial straits, with guitarist Joe Perry owing the band $80,000 for room service, which he planned to repay by recording a solo album. The relationship between Aerosmith and Jack Douglas also became turbulent when the producer divorced his wife, whom the band had liked. This, combined with weak sales of Draw the Line, led to Columbia stepping in, with Douglas reflecting in the band memoir Walk This Way, "The label finally put a lot of pressure on them. It was: 'Look at these sales numbers. Come up with another hit or there's going to be trouble.' David [Krebs, Aerosmith's manager] thought I no longer exercised control over the band, which was true. No one did."

With the album still unfinished, the band was sent on tour to generate revenue, as they had burned through the budget allotment. This premature outing during the summer months pushed the album's release to later in the year. "Our management booked a tour," Hamilton noted, "leaving us just enough time to make the record, based on how long it'd taken us in the past, but we actually needed much more time. So we had to go on tour before the vocals were finished, and it was dragging on and on. Everyone was super-frustrated by it. It's ironic, because we were out on the road, playing stadiums to huge amounts of people, and yet the band was getting ready to die."

Substance abuse among the members gradually worsened, and they started fighting among themselves. This often led to missed and erratic live performances, culminating in a fight involving the members and their wives. The situation finally came to a head on July 28, 1979, at the World Series of Rock in Cleveland, Ohio, when Perry left the band halfway through the tour after a heated argument with Tyler. Shortly after Perry's departure, development for the album resumed, and Night in the Ruts released on November 16, 1979. Prior to Perry's departure, he had completed guitar parts for "No Surprize", "Chiquita", "Cheese Cake", “Reefer Headed Woman”, "Three Mile Smile", and "Bone to Bone (Coney Island White Fish Boy)". Guitar parts for the remaining songs were recorded by Brad Whitford, Richie Supa, Neil Thompson, and Jimmy Crespo. (The last became Perry's official replacement from 1979 to 1984.) Perry's last session with the band was on May 30, 1979. He stated:

We started Night in the Ruts with Jack in the spring of 1979. I'm not sure why he wasn't involved later, but he wasn't ... The Aerosmith album was in limbo from April on and at a certain point I had to wash my hands of it. I said, "It's your album. Do what you want with it. You've got my work. You can use it or erase it. I'm working on something else ... There was all this fighting and bad energy going on ... I was dissatisfied with Krebs, said, 'Fuck this,' and went back to Boston.

In his 2014 autobiography Rocks, Perry elaborated on his frustrations:

I thought we cut some of the best tracks we'd ever done. The guitar interplay between me and Brad broke new ground. Everyone was at the top of their game. When it came time for lyrics, though, Steven began to drift away. Slowly, progress ground to a halt. I started to get annoyed, then aggravated, and then out-and-out pissed ... We'd made untold millions. Where did all of it go? ... We went to work every day, spending a fortune on hotel bills and studio time with nothing to show for it ... The whole operation had become a nightmare. I was tired of the bullshit. I just wanted to get in a van and go play rock-and-roll. I was willing to play clubs – any clubs ... I was told that when Steven finally did show up to do his vocals he was smoking crack."

== Recording and composition ==
Aerosmith spent the summer at Mediasound Studios in New York trying to finish off the album with producer Gary Lyons. The band caught a second wind when Tyler came up with lyrics for a song he had been composing with Perry that "told the story of the band," which became "No Surprize," a song that Tyler has cited as his favorite. In the band's 1997 memoir Walk This Way, Tyler shared his thoughts on several of the album's tracks:

- "No Surprize" - "For two months, I'd been totally blocked, writing lyrics for this track we had done with Joe. 'My name is nah nah nah, I come from Yonkers High, and I get drunk at night.' One night I had such a revelation to write the story of the band, how Aerosmith got started ... I was so excited to be back on track."
- "Reefer Headed Woman" - "'Reefer Head Woman' was a 1940s blues record. I had the lyrics in a notebook that got stolen, and I had to call Dr. Demento from the Record Plant, where we finished the album, and the Doctor read the lyrics to me over the phone."
- "Bone to Bone (Coney Island White Fish Boy)" - I had to explain to the press that a Coney Island whitefish is a used rubber."
- "Mia" - "It was a lullaby I wrote on the piano for my daughter, but the tolling bell notes at the end of the song and the end of the album sounded more like the death knell of Aerosmith for people who knew what was going on."

Also included on the album was a cover of "Think About It," a Yardbirds B-side from 1968 that Aerosmith had occasionally played live through the 70s. Promo videos for "No Surprize" and "Chiquita" were filmed (featuring Jimmy Crespo). "Chiquita" is available on the band's Video Scrapbook VHS and laserdisc release.

The album title is a spoonerism for the phrase "right in the nuts," which is alluded to on the album's rear cover artwork.

== Reception ==
=== Critical reception ===
Professional ratings
Review scores
| Source | Rating |
|---|---|
| AllMusic | 2.5/5 stars |
| Christgau's Record Guide | C+ |
| Collector's Guide to Heavy Metal | 9/10 |
| The Encyclopedia of Popular Music | 2/5 stars |
| MusicHound Rock: The Essential Album Guide | 2/5 stars |
| Record Mirror | 4.5/5 stars |
| The Rolling Stone Album Guide | 1/5 stars |

The album was panned by contemporary critics and despite some early success, it quickly fell down the charts. Rolling Stone writer David Fricke described the album's best tracks "like inspired outtakes from Rocks and Toys in the Attic", showing Aerosmith's return to their basic sound; however, he found "the deviations from this norm ... disastrous, if not in concept then in execution," as in the cover of Shangri-Las ballad "Remember (Walking in the Sand)" "wavering inconsistently between hard rock and the Spectorian grandeur of the original". The Village Voice critic Robert Christgau considered the opening song "No Surprize" the only "promising" track on the album. The Globe and Mail opined that "they're playing here from mere force of habit and not even a rocked-up version of 'Remember (Walking in the Sand)' can disguise the fact that this is humorless, spiritless drivel."

Critic Greg Prato of AllMusic offered a more charitable commentary in a historical context, calling it "a surprisingly coherent and inspired album. Although it's not up to par with such classics as Toys in the Attic or Rocks (although it could have been if the band weren't in such a state of turmoil at the time), it was definitely leaner and more focused than the [band's previous] studio release, Draw the Line." In his Collector's Guide to Heavy Metal, Martin Popoff found the album "a solid record" and a "triumph amidst adversity" which, even with the "band at its least energetic, coherent and cohesive", exudes "the canny genius of years spent welding modern flash rock to the blues."

=== Legacy ===
Tyler has expressed great satisfaction with Night in the Ruts, calling it his favorite album and cryptically enthusing to Stephen Davis in 1997, "Heroin. Shooting coke. Eating opium and it was just ... I love that album – Night in the Ruts. It's like a fuckin' solar eclipse." Perry also insisted to Guitar World in 1997, "We were still fucked up, but the record sounds more cohesive than Draw the Line. Night in the Ruts was a rockin' record."

== Track listing ==
Side one
| No. | Title | Writer(s) | Length |
|---|---|---|---|
| 1. | "No Surprize" | Steven Tyler, Joe Perry | 4:25 |
| 2. | "Chiquita" | Tyler, Perry | 4:24 |
| 3. | "Remember (Walking in the Sand)" (The Shangri-Las cover) | Shadow Morton | 4:04 |
| 4. | "Cheese Cake" | Tyler, Perry | 4:15 |

Side two
| No. | Title | Writer(s) | Length |
|---|---|---|---|
| 1. | "Three Mile Smile" | Tyler, Perry | 3:42 |
| 2. | "Reefer Head Woman" (Jazz Gillum cover) | Joe Bennett, Jazz Gillum, Lester Melrose | 4:01 |
| 3. | "Bone to Bone (Coney Island White Fish Boy)" | Tyler, Perry | 2:59 |
| 4. | "Think About It" (The Yardbirds cover) | Keith Relf, Jimmy Page, Jim McCarty | 3:34 |
| 5. | "Mia" | Tyler | 4:14 |
| Total length: | | | 35:41 |

== Personnel ==
Aerosmith

- Steven Tyler – lead vocals, harmonica, piano, cover art concept
- Joe Perry – guitar, slide guitar and backing vocals on "No Surprize", "Chiquita", "Cheese Cake", "Three Mile Smile", “Reefer Headed Woman”, and "Bone to Bone (Coney Island White Fish Boy)"
- Brad Whitford – guitar
- Tom Hamilton – bass
- Joey Kramer – drums

Additional musicians

- Mary Weiss – backing vocals on "Remember (Walking in the Sand)"
- Richie Supa – additional guitars on "No Surprize" and "Mia"
- Jimmy Crespo – lead guitar on "Three Mile Smile"
- George Young – alto saxophone on "Chiquita"
- Louis del Gatto – baritone saxophone on "Chiquita"
- Lou Marini – tenor saxophone on "Chiquita"
- Barry Rogers – trombone on "Chiquita"
- Neil Thompson – guitar on "Mia"

Production

- Gary Lyons – producer with Aerosmith, engineer
- David Krebs, Steve Leber – executive producers, management
- Peter Thea, Rod O'Brien – assistant engineers
- George Marino – mastering at Sterling Sound, New York
- John Berg, John Kosh – art direction, design
- Jim Shea – photography
- Vic Anesini – remastering

== Charts ==
| Chart (1979) | Peak position |
|---|---|
| Canada Top Albums/CDs (RPM) | 8 |
| Japanese Albums (Oricon) | 39 |
| US Billboard 200 | 14 |

== Certification ==
| Region | Certification | Certified units/sales |
|---|---|---|
| Canada (Music Canada) | Gold | 50,000^{^} |
| United States (RIAA) | Platinum | 1,000,000^{^} |
^{^} Shipments figures based on certification alone.

== Bibliography ==
- Davis, Stephen; Aerosmith (October 1, 1997). Walk This Way: The Autobiography of Aerosmith. New York City: Avon Books. ISBN 978-0-380-97594-5.
- Huxley, Martin (2015). Aerosmith: The Fall and the Rise of Rock's Greatest Band. St. Martin's Publishing Group. ISBN 978-1250096531.
- Perry, Joe; Ritz, David (October 7, 2014). Rocks: My Life In and Out of Aerosmith. New York City: Simon & Schuster. ISBN 978-1-476-71454-7.
