= Out in the Streets =

Single by the Shangri-Las

from the album Shangri-Las-65!
- B-side: "The Boy"
- Released: April 1965
- Length: 2:39
- Label: Red Bird
- Songwriters: Ellie Greenwich, Jeff Barry
- Producer: Shadow Morton

The Shangri-Las singles chronology
"Maybe" (1964)	"Out in the Streets" (1965)	"Give Us Your Blessings" (1965)

"Out in the Streets" is a song written by Ellie Greenwich and Jeff Barry. It was first recorded by the American girl group the Shangri-Las in 1965 and released as their fifth single. The song was produced by Shadow Morton, arranged by Artie Butler and released on Red Bird Records (RB 10-025) with the Morton composition "The Boy" on the B-Side. It reached number 53 on the US Billboard Top 100.

The Shangri-Las performed "Out in the Streets" on the TV show Shindig! in 1965. Later that year, the song was added to their second album, Shangri-Las-65!

The song was covered by Blondie in 1975; but this cover was not released until 1994, when it was included on The Platinum Collection. Blondie subsequently covered it again in 1999 for their album No Exit.

The song was used in artist Elizabeth Price's 2012 Turner Prize winning video installation The Woolworths Choir of 1979.

The song is sampled in Sharleen Spiteri's song All the Times I Cried.
