= Maybe (The Chantels song) =

1957 single by The Chantels

Single by the Chantels

from the album We Are the Chantels
- B-side: "Come My Little Baby"
- Released: December 1957
- Recorded: October 16, 1957
- Venue: A Catholic church in Midtown Manhattan
- Length: 2:32
- Label: End
- Songwriters: George Goldner; Roger "Casey" Case (Note: Credited on the original single release, but stopped being regularly credited.); Richard Barrett (Note: Later credited.); Arlene Smith (Note: Later credited and widely believed to be an author.)
- Producer: Richard Barrett

The Chantels singles chronology
"He's Gone" (1957)	"Maybe" (1957)	"Every Night (I Pray)" (1958)

"Maybe" is a song originally credited to George Goldner and Roger "Casey" Case, though later reissues and publications have given additional credit to Richard Barrett and Arlene Smith. It was recorded by American girl group the Chantels and released as their second single by End Records in December 1957.

Ranked among some of the best songs of all-time, "Maybe" is widely credited with establishing the popular girl group sound and the place of female vocal groups in rhythm and blues music.

== Release ==
"Maybe" was released as a single in early December 1957 by End, and received immediate success in the New York City area before gaining national attention in the following months. It reached its peak of #15 on Billboard's pop charts and #2 on their R&B charts by the end of that winter. Following its success in the United States, it was also released internationally. It was released in the United Kingdom and Australia in February 1958 by London Recordings, and in Canada by Reo Records. It found major success in Canada, where it held the #1 position Canadian CHUM Chart for two weeks. It went on to reportedly become the first song by a girl group to sell a million copies.

== Recording ==
Following the success of their previous single "He's Gone", which reached #71 on the Billboard charts, the Chantels were quick to have another recording session. "Maybe" was recorded on October 16, 1957 alongside its b-side "Come My Little Baby" in a refurbished Catholic church in Midtown Manhattan, chosen for its pipe organ. Piano in the session was played by Richard Barrett and the orchestra was led by Buddy Lucas, alongside others playing bass and drums (the drums were potentially played by Panama Francis). The song took 52 takes to record due to their manager being repeatedly dissatisfied with its sound, leading to lead singer Arlene Smith being in tears by the end of the session.

== Critical reception ==
In a review from the December 2, 1957 issue of Billboard Magazine, "Maybe" is described as "organized confusion" and a song that "has to be watched - and it has to be heard to be believed."

== Composition ==
"Maybe" is a doo-wop song that incorporates pop, gospel, and R&B. According to sheet music published by EMI Longitude Music and EMI Music Publishing, "Maybe" has a tempo of 70 beats per minute and a 12/8 time signature, set in the key of B♭ minor. The song is "a powerful story of losing someone you adore and the despair of trying to win them back" and "obsessive teenage lamentation." Arlene Smith, who was only 16 years old at the time of recording, has said that she was "singing about the kind of love [she] didn't know," and that her performance was rather inspired by her love for her parents.

=== Authorship disputes ===
"Maybe" has been the source of multiple conflicting claims relating to its authorship. The original single release lists George Goldner and Roger "Casey" Case as co-writers on the track, though Goldner is listed as the sole writer on its album We Are the Chantels. Some later releases would list Arlene Smith as a co-writer alongside Goldner, and starting in the mid-1960s Richard Barrett began to be credited as the sole writer on most releases. Despite these claims, it is now widely cited that "Maybe" was written solely by Arlene Smith.

According to Arlene Smith, the writing of the song was a collaboration between her, Goldner, and Barrett. In her account, she was sent a 78 demonstration record of the song from George Goldner, but re-wrote the lyrics of the song after being dissatisfied with the original lyrics, saying that "it just rambled on and on ... it was like a gospel song." Following this, Barrett would later write the song's central piano line as well as other aspects of the instrumental.

== Legacy ==
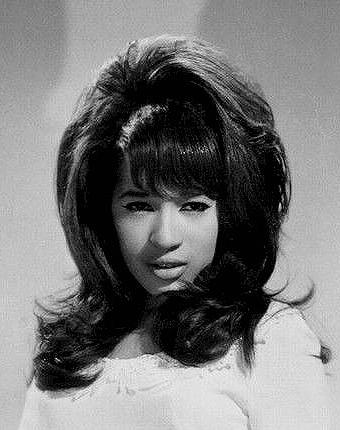
Ronnie Spector has cited "Maybe" as a major influence.

"Maybe" has been credited with defining the girl group sound and laying the groundwork for later girl groups such as The Shirelles, The Marvelettes, and The Supremes, among countless others, as well as turning the all-female group into an important part of the R&B scene. Bobby Jay, a prominent New York City disc jockey of the 1950s and 60s, describes this song as "opening the floodgates", "every group that followed them wanted to be the Chantels." Ronnie Spector of the Ronettes has cited "Maybe" as being one of her first inspirations for pursuing a career in music. Performance-wise, it is widely considered to be a benchmark recording which "many vocalists would forever hold paramount."

Rolling Stone listed "Maybe" as the 199th greatest song of all-time in 2015, and Billboard listed it as the 60th greatest girl group song of all time in 2017. It was also included in Robert Christgau's "Basic Record Library" of 1950s and 1960s recordings, published in Christgau's Record Guide: Rock Albums of the Seventies (1981). In 2019, the Chantels' recording was inducted into the Rock and Roll Hall of Fame.

== Charts ==
Weekly chart performance
Chart (1958)	Peak Position
Canada (CHUM Chart)	1
US Best Sellers in Stores (Billboard)	16
US R&B Best Sellers in Stores (Billboard)	5
US Most Played R&B by Jockeys (Billboard)	2
US Cashbox Top 60 Best Selling Tunes on Records	19
US Cashbox R&B Top 20	2

Year-end charts
Chart (1958)	Peak Position
US Year-End Top R&B Singles (Billboard)	27
US Cashbox Top R&B Singles of 1958	25

== The Shangri-Las version ==
"Maybe"

Single by the Shangri-Las

from the album Leader of the Pack
- B-side: "Shout"
- Released: December 1964
- Length: 2:35
- Label: Red Bird
- Songwriter: George Goldner
- Producer: Shadow Morton

The Shangri-Las singles chronology
"Give Him a Great Big Kiss" (1964)	"Maybe" (1964)	"Out in the Streets" (1965)

American vocal group the Shangri-Las released a version of the song in December 1964, as the fourth single from their album Leader of the Pack.

=== Charts ===
Weekly chart performance
Chart (1965)	Peak Position
US Billboard Hot 100	91

== The Three Degrees versions ==
"Maybe"

Single by The Three Degrees

from the album Maybe
- B-side: "Sugar on Sunday"
- Released: 1970
- Genre: Soul
- Length: 4:06
- Label: Roulette
- Songwriter: Richard Barrett
- Producer: Richard Barrett

The Three Degrees singles chronology
"Melting Pot" (1970)	"Maybe" (1970)	"Do I Take You" (1970)

American vocal group the Three Degrees has released two versions of the song as singles. First being in 1965 which failed to chart, followed by a re-recorded version in 1970 as the lead single to their debut album of the same name, which received greater success.

=== Charts ===
Weekly chart performance
Chart (1970)	Peak Position
US Billboard Hot 100	29
US Best Selling Soul Singles (Billboard)	4

== Janis Joplin version ==
"Maybe"

Single by Janis Joplin

from the album I Got Dem Ol' Kozmic Blues Again Mama!
- B-side: "Work Me, Lord"
- Released: 1969
- Recorded: June 16–26, 1969
- Studio: Columbia Records Studios, New York
- Genre: Blues rock
- Length: 3:38
- Label: Columbia
- Songwriter: Richard Barrett
- Producer: Gabriel Mekler

Janis Joplin singles chronology
"Try (Just a Little Bit Harder)" (1970)	"Maybe" (1969)	"Me and Bobby McGee" (1971)

The song was released as a single by American singer-songwriter Janis Joplin in 1969 from her debut solo album I Got Dem Ol' Kozmic Blues Again Mama!
