= You Want What We Got =

1985 song by Twisted Sister

Single by Twisted Sister

from the album Come Out and Play
- B-side: "Shoot 'Em Down"
- Released: February 1986 (US); April 21, 1986 (UK)
- Genre: Heavy metal; glam metal
- Length: 3:42
- Label: Atlantic
- Songwriter: Dee Snider
- Producer: Dieter Dierks

Twisted Sister singles chronology
"Leader of the Pack" (1985)	"You Want What We Got" (1986)	"King of Fools" (1986)

"You Want What We Got" is a song by American heavy metal band Twisted Sister, released in 1986 as the second single from their fourth studio album, Come Out and Play (1985). It was released in the US in February 1986, followed by the UK on April 21, 1986. The song was written by Dee Snider and produced by Dieter Dierks.

== Release ==
"You Want What We Got" was released in the US as the second single from Come Out and Play in February 1986. It followed "Leader of the Pack" which stalled at number 53 on the Billboard Hot 100. After the commercial disappointment of "Leader of the Pack", Atlantic Records originally intended to release "Be Chrool To Your Scuel" as Twisted Sister's next single, but the plans were scrapped after MTV banned its pre-made video. The label then decided against releasing a second single from the album in the US, but ultimately elected to release "You Want What We Got". Snider recalled in his 2012 autobiography Shut Up and Give Me the Mic: A Twisted Memoir, "The president of the label decided not to release a follow-up single to the failed 'Leader of the Pack'. This was insanity. We had sold 5 million records worldwide with Stay Hungry, and he wasn't going to give our new album a second shot?!"

Atlantic hoped the single would generate airplay on rock radio. David Fleischman, Atlantic's director of national album promotion, encouraged radio stations to play the track through the radio programming guide The Friday Morning Quarterback Album Report by writing, "Dee Snider went to Washington, appeared before a Senate sub-committee, and defended rock and roll. Don't let the spurious accusations of a handful of narrow-minded people dictate the boundaries allowing what music one may or may not be exposed to. Support the man and the band that supported you. Play Twisted Sister's 'You Want What We Got'. This is rock and roll."

== Critical reception ==
Upon its release as a single, Cash Box noted that "You Want What We Got" "contains more of the feel and sentiment" of the band's 1984 hit single "We're Not Gonna Take It" than the lead single from Come Out and Play, "Leader of the Pack". They noted that "thunderous drums and Snider's scowling, turned-lip vocal predominate" on the track.

In the UK, Neil Spencer of Sounds considered the "bubblegum metal" to be "virtually lovable, almost cuddly, and very much like 1973 Slade". Kevin Bryan of the Gloucestershire Echo described it as "another joyously over-the-top epic" from Twisted Sister and "good rabble-rousing rock". Dave Ling of Number One reviewed the single alongside Van Halen's "Why Can't This Be Love", writing, "Dee Snider and chums must be gritting their teeth. It's been three long years since they last graced Top of the Pops, and although their live shows are still captivating events, there's no disguising that 'You Want What We Got' sounds laboured and clumsy alongside Van Halen's effort. Sorry Dee." Dave Dickson of Kerrang! felt it was "not as classy a single" as "I Am (I'm Me)" or "We're Not Gonna Take It". He added, "It's hard, it's heavy, I'd love it to become a hit but somehow I just can't see it happening with this one."

== Track listing ==
7–inch single (US, Canada, Australia and Japan)

1. "You Want What We Got" – 3:42
2. "Shoot 'Em Down" – 3:52

7–inch single (UK)

1. "You Want What We Got" – 3:42
2. "Stay Hungry" – 3:03

12–inch single (UK)

1. "You Want What We Got" – 3:42
2. "Stay Hungry" – 3:03
3. "We're Not Gonna Take It" – 3:39
4. "King of the Fools" – 6:25

== Personnel ==
Twisted Sister

- Dee Snider – lead vocals, backing vocals
- Jay Jay French – guitars, backing vocals
- Eddie "Fingers" Ojeda – guitars, backing vocals
- Mark "The Animal" Mendoza – bass, backing vocals
- A. J. Pero – drums, backing vocals

Production

- Dieter Dierks – production and mastering ("You Want What We Got", "King of the Fools")
- Tom Werman – production ("Stay Hungry", "We're Not Gonna Take It")
- Pete Way – production ("Shoot 'Em Down")
- Mark Mendoza – production ("Shoot 'Em Down")
- Eddie DeLena – engineering ("You Want What We Got", "King of the Fools")
- Bob Ludwig – mastering ("You Want What We Got", "King of the Fools")

== Charts ==
Chart (1986)	Peak position
UK Heavy Metal Singles (Spotlight Research)	15
