= Shangri-Las-65! =

Studio album by the Shangri-Las
- Released: September 1965
- Recorded: 1965
- Genre: Pop
- Length: 30:05 (first pressing); 30:55 (second pressing)
- Label: Red Bird
- Producers: Shadow Morton; Jeff Barry; Robert Bateman; Ronald Moseley

The Shangri-Las chronology
| Leader of the Pack (1965) | Shangri-Las-65! (1965) |

Singles from Shangri-Las-65!
- 1. "Out in the Streets" Released: March 1965; 2. "Give Us Your Blessings" Released: May 1965; 3. "Right Now and Not later" Released: August 1965; 4. "I Can Never Go Home Anymore" Released: October 1965

Shangri-Las-65! is the second and final album by the Shangri-Las. Released in September 1965 by Red Bird Records, it serves as the follow-up album to Leader of the Pack, which was released earlier in the year. Shangri-Las-65! was reissued and re-titled as I Can Never Go Home Anymore later in the same year, with the song "I Can Never Go Home Anymore" added to the album after it became a hit single.

== Content and reception ==
Professional ratings
Review scores
| Source | Rating |
|---|---|
| AllMusic | 3.5/5 stars |
| The Encyclopedia of Popular Music | 3/5 stars |

=== Releases and singles ===
The original pressing of the album contains the singles "Out in the Streets", "Give Us Your Blessings" and "Right Now and Not Later". The second pressing includes the hit single "I Can Never Go Home Anymore", and excludes the album track "The Dum Dum Ditty". The second pressing was later repackaged and re-released as I Can Never Go Home Anymore.

=== Other songs ===
"The Dum Dum Ditty" and "Sophisticated Boom Boom" had been released first as a single by another American female band, the Goodies, also in 1965, but failed to chart. In retrospective reviews, AllMusic called the Shangri-Las version of "Sophisticated Boom Boom" a classic and highlighted its wry humor, "the freakout scat solo" and "the funky James Brown groove" that permeates the track.

Another of the album's songs, "What's a Girl Supposed to Do?", had also been released previously by another artist, Lesley Gore, in 1965. Dave Thompson compared the two versions in AllMusic: "whereas Gore recites the song with becoming innocence, the Shangri-Las sound, characteristically, somewhat raunchier – 'kiss him, hold him, hug him, love him'... and then a silence so suggestive that any further detail seems unnecessary."

Mary Ann Ganser sang the lead vocal on "I'm Blue", which is a cover of the Ikettes' 1961 hit song. AllMusic highlighted "the tight bluesy garage-rock feel of the performance, the understated organ that floats beneath the melody and the ghostly sax that plays call-and-response with the middle eight".

"Heaven Only Knows" was the only Shangri-Las song that their lead singer Mary Weiss recorded again, 42 years later, for her only solo album, Dangerous Game (2007).

British musician Miki Berenyi named Shangri-Las-65! as one of her top 10 favorite albums: "I loved the album's mix of headstrong emotion ('Never Again'), melodrama ('The Train from Kansas City'), and cool banter ('Sophisticated Boom Boom')." She added that "it was a great record for acting out," singing and dancing with a female schoolmate.

The song "Sophisticated Boom Boom" gave name to two female bands that were active in the early 1980s: a Scottish five piece and a Swiss trio. It also gave name to a 2003 book by John Kelly and a 2013 compilation album of songs written or produced by Shadow Morton.

== Track listing ==
Side one

| No. | Title | Writer(s) | Length |
|---|---|---|---|
| 1. | "Right Now and Not Later" | Robert Bateman, Ronald Moseley, Kenny Hollon | 2:38 |
| 2. | "Never Again" | Tony Michaels, Vinny Gormann, Robert Racano | 2:20 |
| 3. | "Give Us Your Blessings" | Ellie Greenwich, Jeff Barry | 2:12 |
| 4. | "Sophisticated Boom Boom" | George Morton | 2:08 |
| 5. | "I'm Blue" | Ike Turner | 3:27 |
| 6. | "Heaven Only Knows" | Ellie Greenwich, Jeff Barry | 2:10 |

Side two (first pressing)

| No. | Title | Writer(s) | Length |
|---|---|---|---|
| 7. | "The Train from Kansas City" | Ellie Greenwich, Jeff Barry | 3:04 |
| 8. | "Out in the Streets" | Ellie Greenwich, Jeff Barry | 2:44 |
| 9. | "What's a Girl Supposed to Do?" | Ellie Greenwich, Jeff Barry | 2:20 |
| 10. | "The Dum Dum Ditty" | Bobby Hart, Tommy Boyce, Larry Martire, Steve Venet | 2:21 |
| 11. | "You Cheated, You Lied" | Levon Helm | 2:21 |
| 12. | "The Boy" | George Morton | 2:20 |

Side two (second pressing and I Can Never Go Home Anymore)

| No. | Title | Writer(s) | Length |
|---|---|---|---|
| 7. | "I Can Never Go Home Anymore" | George Morton | 3:11 |
| 8. | "The Train from Kansas City" | Ellie Greenwich, Jeff Barry | 3:04 |
| 9. | "Out in the Streets" | Ellie Greenwich, Jeff Barry | 2:44 |
| 10. | "What's a Girl Supposed to Do?" | Ellie Greenwich, Jeff Barry | 2:20 |
| 11. | "You Cheated, You Lied" | Levon Helm | 2:21 |
| 12. | "The Boy" | George Morton | 2:20 |

== Personnel ==
=== Shangri-Las ===
- Mary Weiss – lead and backing vocals
- Betty Weiss – lead and backing vocals
- Mary Ann Ganser – lead and backing vocals
- Marguerite Ganser – backing vocals

=== Additional personnel ===
- George "Shadow" Morton – producer
- Jeff Barry – producer
- Robert Bateman – producer
- Ronald Moseley – producer
- Artie Butler – arranger

== Charts ==
Albums

| Year | Title | Chart | Position |
|---|---|---|---|
| 1965 | Shangri-Las-65! | US Billboard 200 | — |
| 1965 | Shangri-Las-65! | US Cashbox Top 100 Albums | 103 |
| 1965 | Shangri-Las-65! | US Record World 100 Top Lp's | 108 |
| 1965 | I Can Never Go Home Anymore | US Billboard 200 | — |
| 1965 | I Can Never Go Home Anymore | US Cashbox Top 100 Albums | — |
| 1965 | I Can Never Go Home Anymore | US Record World 100 Top Lp's | — |

Singles

| Year | Title | Chart | Position |
|---|---|---|---|
| 1965 | "Out in the Streets" | US Billboard Hot 100 | 53 |
| 1965 | "Out in the Streets" | US Cashbox Top 100 | 73 |
| 1965 | "Out in the Streets" | Canada R.P.M Top 40 & 5 | 7 |
| 1965 | "Give Us Your Blessings" | US Billboard Hot 100 | 29 |
| 1965 | "Give Us Your Blessings" | US Cashbox Top 100 | 33 |
| 1965 | "Give Us Your Blessings" | Canada R.P.M Top 40 & 5 | 21 |
| 1965 | "Right Now and Not Later" | US Billboard Hot 100 | 99 |
| 1965 | "Right Now and Not Later" | US Cashbox Top 100 | 150 |
| 1965 | "Right Now and Not Later" | Canada R.P.M Top 40 & 5 | — |
| 1965 | "I Can Never Go Home Anymore" | US Billboard Hot 100 | 6 |
| 1965 | "I Can Never Go Home Anymore" | US Cashbox Top 100 | 7 |
| 1965 | "I Can Never Go Home Anymore" | Canada R.P.M Top 40 & 5 | 2 |
