= Leader of the Pack =

1964 single by the Shangri-Las

Single by the Shangri-Las

from the album Leader of the Pack
- B-side: "What Is Love"
- Released: September 20, 1964
- Recorded: 1964
- Genre: Pop; rock and roll
- Length: 2:59
- Label: Red Bird
- Songwriters: George "Shadow" Morton; Jeff Barry; Ellie Greenwich
- Producer: George "Shadow" Morton

The Shangri-Las singles chronology
"Remember (Walking in the Sand)" (1964)	"Leader of the Pack" (1964)	"Give Him a Great Big Kiss" (1964)

Official audio
- "Leader of the Pack" on YouTube

"Leader of the Pack" is a song written by George "Shadow" Morton, Jeff Barry, and Ellie Greenwich. It was a number one pop hit in 1964 for the American girl group the Shangri-Las. The single is one of the group's best known songs as well as a popular cultural example of a "teenage tragedy song". The song was covered in 1985 by the heavy metal band Twisted Sister, who had a more modest chart appearance with their version (no. 53 in the US).

== Background and composition ==
The tune of "Leader of the Pack" is credited to pop impresario George "Shadow" Morton together with Jeff Barry and Ellie Greenwich. According to Morton, he wrote the song for the Goodies (also known as the Bunnies), but instead it was needed as a follow-up to the Shangri-Las hit "Remember (Walking in the Sand)".

=== Lyrical content ===
The song is about a girl named Betty, who is asked by friends to confirm that she is dating Jimmy, the leader of a motorcycle gang, whose ring they see on Betty's finger. After singing of love at first sight ("(By the way, where'd you meet him?) I met him at the candy store/He turned around and smiled at me/You get the picture?/(Yes, we see) That's when I fell for the Leader of the Pack"), Betty's heart turns to despair as she bemoans her parents' disapproval. The parents say Jimmy hails from "the wrong side of town" and ask Betty to tell Jimmy goodbye and find someone new. Betty reluctantly does as she is asked, and a crushed and tearful Jimmy speeds off on his motorcycle. Betty's pleas for Jimmy to slow down are in vain and Jimmy crashes on a rain-slicked surface and dies.

== The Shangri-Las original version ==
=== Recording ===
In July 1964, Morton recorded the vocals for "Leader of the Pack" with the Shangri-Las at Mira Sound Studios located on 145 West 47th street on the second floor of a Manhattan hotel. The song was produced by Morton. These vocals were dubbed over the instrumental parts, which had been previously recorded at the Ultrasonic Recording Studios in Hempstead, New York. In 2007 Tony Visconti wrote that pianist Artie Butler played on the track.

To add the authentic sound of a motorcycle engine, one was reportedly driven through the lobby of the hotel and up to the floor of the recording studio. No one was arrested, but a ticket was issued. The motorcycle belonged to the assistant engineer on the session, who was Joe Venneri. However, in an interview four decades later, Shangri-Las lead singer Mary Weiss denied that there was any motorcycle in the studio. Hugh Grundy, drummer for the Zombies, revved up a motorcycle backstage when the Shangri-Las performed at Murray the K's 1964 Christmas show at the Brooklyn Fox Theater. This live performance was recorded and released on the album Murray the K's Greatest Holiday Show.

=== Reception ===
"Leader of the Pack" was released as a single by Red Bird Records, a Leiber and Stoller label, and the song hit number one on the Billboard Hot 100 on November 28, 1964. On Cashbox's R&B chart, it went to number 8. In the United Kingdom, the single was refused airplay by the BBC, probably due to its death theme, although some have speculated that it was considered likely to encourage violence between mods and rockers. It charted three times on the UK Singles Chart: number 11 in 1965; number 3 in 1972 (by which time the BBC ban had been lifted); and once again at number 7 in 1976, when its sales figures as a reissue on two different labels (Charly and Contempo) were combined to arrive at its chart position. The record also reached number 1 in Australia in 1964, and 39 in 1973.

Cash Box described it as "a heartbreaking cha cha thumper about a gal in love with the 'Leader Of The Pack'—who loses his life in a cycle crash" with "sensational vocal and instrumental sounds" and a "powerhouse" production." In 2004, Rolling Stone ranked the song among the 500 Greatest Songs of All Time at number 447. In the 2010 revision of the list, it was moved to number 454 as new entries were added. In the 2021 update, it was moved to number 315. Billboard named the song number 9 on their 2017 list of 100 Greatest Girl Group Songs of All Time. In 2019, the song was inducted into the Rock and Roll Hall of Fame under the new singles category created in 2018.

The song appeared in a Broadway musical based on the songs of Ellie Greenwich, Leader of the Pack, which opened in 1985. In 1990, the song was used in the Martin Scorsese film Goodfellas.

=== Charts ===
Chart (1964–1972)	Peak position
Australia (Australian National Charts)	1
Canada Top Singles (RPM)	3
New Zealand (Lever Hit Parades)	1
UK Singles (Official Charts)	3
US Billboard Hot 100	1
Chart (1973)	Peak position
Australia (Kent Music Report)	39

== Twisted Sister version ==
"Leader of the Pack"

Single by Twisted Sister

from the album Come Out and Play
- Released: November 1985
- Recorded: 1985
- Genre: Glam metal
- Length: 3:48
- Label: Atlantic
- Songwriters: George "Shadow" Morton; Jeff Barry; Ellie Greenwich
- Producer: Dieter Dierks

Twisted Sister singles chronology
"The Price" (1984)	"Leader of the Pack" (1985)	"You Want What We Got" (1986)

In 1985, the heavy metal band Twisted Sister recorded a cover version of "Leader of the Pack" from the eponymous leader's perspective, where it is the female lover that was in a car accident, although, in the video, she does not die. The track was included on the group's fourth studio album, Come Out and Play, and was released on Atlantic Records as the album's lead single. It reached number 53 on the Billboard Hot 100 chart and number 47 on the UK Singles chart.

=== Background ===
Twisted Sister began playing "Leader of the Pack" when performing live in the clubs during the early years of their career. They first recorded a demo version of the song at Electric Lady Studios in Greenwich Village, with Eddie Kramer as the producer, in November 1979, and this recording was released on the band's 1982 EP Ruff Cutts.

When working on their fourth studio album, Come Out and Play, in 1985, frontman Dee Snider suggested Twisted Sister should record "Leader of the Pack" as their next single. Inspired by Mötley Crüe's recent success with their cover of "Smokin' in the Boys Room", Snider was convinced "Leader of the Pack" would "appeal to everybody, including the parents of our fans who knew the original from when they were growing up". He recalled in his 2012 autobiography Shut Up and Give Me the Mic: A Twisted Memoir, "I was positive this was the track that would break down any barriers left for Twisted Sister and bring us to the level of Springsteen, Prince and Madonna. I believed that we were the band that could bring metal to the mainstream."

=== Critical reception ===
Upon its release as a single, Nancy Erlich of Billboard wrote, "The guitars are megaton metal, the melody is unchanged, and it's the girl who gets killed; one of the year's odder cultural artifacts." Cash Box considered it to be a "supercharged version of a classic [which] is perfect for the comic book rock of Twisted Sister". They added, "Snider's vocal interpretation is heartful and humorous, and the power-chord backing is sure to catch the ear of many CHR and rock radio programmers." Malcolm Dome of Kerrang! noted that, as with the band's earlier recording of the song, "the humor is still prevalent as well as a genuine respect for a classic pop number", but this time there's "a fine production and a firmer, resonant arrangement".

=== Charts ===
Chart (1985–1986)	Peak position
Canada Top Singles (RPM)	80
New Zealand (Recorded Music NZ)	45
UK Singles (Official Charts)	47
US Billboard Hot 100	53
US Mainstream Rock Airplay (Billboard)	32

== Influence and other versions ==
- In 1965, "Leader of the Laundromat", written by Paul Vance and Lee Pockriss, was released by the Detergents and peaked at number 19 on the US Billboard Hot 100 in January 1965. This resulted in Morton, Barry and Greenwich filing a lawsuit for plagiarism.
- On her debut album The Divine Miss M (1972), Bette Midler did a version which began in the original tempo, sped up in the second verse, and was so fast by the end that it became difficult to understand the lyrics. Her rendition of the song has been praised by Robert Christgau and AllMusic's Mark Deming among others.
- British punk rock group the Damned quoted the first line of the song ("Is she really going out with him?") in their single "New Rose". The song was the first ever single released by a British punk band.
- British comedian Julian Clary sang a parody of "Leader of the Pack" in 1988–1990 as part of his then-act, The Joan Collins Fan Club. It was released as a single in the UK and reached a peak position of No. 60 on the UK singles chart in the summer of 1988. Clary sang the lead part from the point of view of a camp 28-year-old gay man bewailing the loss of his biker love interest in a fatal motorcycle accident.
- Anglia Building Society used a version of the song (with modified lyrics referencing the product) to advertise their child account, the Anglia Top Savers' Club, on UK television in the 1980s.

== See also ==
- Teenage tragedy song
