= I Can Never Go Home Anymore =

- Dutch picture sleeve

Single by the Shangri-Las

from the album Shangri-Las-65!
- B-side: "Bull Dog" / "Sophisticated Boom Boom" (on some pressings)
- Released: October 1965
- Genre: Pop
- Length: 3:12
- Label: Red Bird
- Songwriter: Shadow Morton
- Producer: Shadow Morton

The Shangri-Las singles chronology
"Right Now and Not Later" (1965)	"I Can Never Go Home Anymore" (1965)	"Long Live Our Love" (1966)

"I Can Never Go Home Anymore" is a song written by Shadow Morton and performed by the Shangri-Las. It reached number 6 on the U.S. pop chart in 1965. The song was added to their 1965 album Shangri-Las-65! (reissued as I Can Never Go Home Anymore).

The single was arranged by Artie Butler and produced by Shadow Morton.

== Lyric content ==
A girl threatens to run away if her mother will not allow her to do what she wants, but she is advised against it by another girl (the song's narrator) whose circumstances turned tragic after having done the same. After a heated disagreement with her mother over a boy, the narrator packed some clothes and left home. She forgot about the boy immediately after and thought about her mother's love and care. Before the narrator could return home, her mother died of a broken heart.

== Other versions ==
- In 1965, the Detergents released a parody song, "I Can Never Eat Home Anymore", that was not as successful as their previous spoof on the Shangri-Las, "Leader of the Laundromat".
- David Wrench released a version of the song on his 1998 EP David Wrench Sings the Songs of The Shangri-La's [sic].
