= I Got Dem Ol' Kozmic Blues Again Mama! =

Studio album by Janis Joplin
- Released: September 11, 1969
- Recorded: June 16–26, 1969
- Studios: Columbia Records Studios, New York City, New York
- Genres: Blues rock; psychedelic rock; soul
- Length: 37:31
- Label: Columbia
- Producer: Gabriel Mekler

Janis Joplin chronology
Cheap Thrills (1968)	I Got Dem Ol' Kozmic Blues Again Mama! (1969)	Pearl (1971)

I Got Dem Ol' Kozmic Blues Again Mama! is the debut solo and third studio album overall by American singer-songwriter Janis Joplin, released on September 11, 1969, by Columbia Records. It was the first album which Joplin recorded after leaving her former band, Big Brother and the Holding Company, and the only solo album released during her lifetime.

== Recording history ==
Recording began on June 16, 1969, in New York City and ceased on June 26. For the album, Joplin recruited guitarist Sam Andrew of the Holding Company to take part in development, along with the Kozmic Blues Band. Joplin installed a brass and horn section into the tracks, a feature her previous band would not allow. It was a total contrast to Joplin's previous psychedelic rock as the compositions chosen were more soul and blues driven. All but two tracks were cover versions that producer Gabriel Mekler and Joplin chose. The other two tracks, "One Good Man" and "Kozmic Blues", were written by Joplin herself. Overall, the album was a more polished work, but was not as successful as Cheap Thrills.

=== Release ===
The LP was released on September 11, 1969, and reached gold record status within two months of its release. It was issued by Columbia with the catalog number KCS 9913. The first pressing was titled only on the spine and disc labels. Later, the title of the album was added as a sticker designed by Robert Crumb and stuck to the shrink wrap. The album was re-released by Columbia as WKPC 9913 and again as PC 9913 both on vinyl. The re-issued album did not have the same title sticker, instead the re-issues had the title printed on the cover and the CBS Records "Nice Price" sticker on the shrink wrap. Some of the newer PC 9913 copies have a bar code. A 180-gram limited-edition classic LP high-definition virgin heavy vinyl pressing was also released in 2010. Technically, this album was reissued on vinyl a total of six times. Many collectors are mistaken in thinking the issue that included the R. Crumb sticker was the original issue; it was not. The hard-to-find original sealed issue is KCS 9913, which had no R. Crumb sticker, and the title was only on the spine of the cover. Columbia Records released as a single "Kozmic Blues" b/w "Little Girl Blue" 4-45023. The single peaked at #41 on the US Billboard charts.

I Got Dem Ol' Kozmic Blues Again Mama! also contains the hits "Try (Just A Little Bit Harder)," "Kozmic Blues" and "To Love Somebody." The 1999 CD reissue of the album includes the outtake cover of Bob Dylan's "Dear Landlord," with new lyrics and arrangements provided by Joplin, and versions of "Summertime" and "Piece of My Heart" recorded live at Woodstock as bonus tracks.

== Reception ==
Professional ratings
Review scores
Source	Rating
AllMusic	3/5 stars
Robert Christgau	A−
MusicHound Rock	1/5 stars
Rolling Stone	(favorable)

John Burks of Rolling Stone wrote in a November 1, 1969, interview praising Joplin's vocal performance. However, he notes that her vocals are hindered by her backup band's instrumental role in the album. Overall, Burks was satisfied with Joplin's change in musical direction, but recommends "reaching the point where you are able to shut out the band".

According to Richie Unterberger, the album was poorly reviewed on its initial release, due in part to its shift towards soul/R&B and away from the hard rock/psychedelic sound that brought her to fame with Big Brother and the Holding Company. Over the decades, Unterberger notes that opinions of the album have warmed somewhat and that taken on its own merits the album has its strengths, but he nonetheless describes it as a "flawed" effort due in part to the backing musicians sounding "a little stiff".

== Track listing ==
No.	Title	Writer(s)	Length
1.	"Try (Just a Little Bit Harder)"	Jerry Ragovoy, Chip Taylor	3:57
2.	"Maybe"	Richard Barrett	3:41
3.	"One Good Man"	Janis Joplin	4:12
4.	"As Good as You've Been to This World"	Nick Gravenites	5:27
5.	"To Love Somebody"	Barry Gibb, Robin Gibb	5:14
6.	"Kozmic Blues"	Joplin, Gabriel Mekler	4:24
7.	"Little Girl Blue"	Lorenz Hart, Richard Rodgers	3:51
8.	"Work Me, Lord"	Nick Gravenites	6:45

1999 CD reissue bonus tracks
No.	Title	Writer(s)	Length
9.	"Dear Landlord" (Session Outtake June 17, 1969)	Bob Dylan, Joplin	2:32
10.	"Summertime" (Live at Woodstock, August 1969)	George Gershwin	5:04
11.	"Piece of My Heart" (Live at Woodstock, August 1969)	Ragovoy, Bert Berns	6:31

== Personnel ==
- Janis Joplin – lead vocals, guitar
- Sam Andrew – guitar, vocals
- Michael Monarch – guitar (uncredited)
- Mike Bloomfield – guitar on "Maybe", "One Good Man", "To Love Somebody", and "Work Me, Lord"
- Brad Campbell – bass guitar, brass instrumentation
- Richard Kermode – electronic organ, keyboards
- Gabriel Mekler – electronic organ, keyboards
- Goldy McJohn – electronic organ, keyboards (uncredited)
- Maury Baker – drums
- Lonnie Castille – drums
- Jerry Edmonton – drums (uncredited)
- Terry Clements – tenor saxophone
- Cornelius "Snooky" Flowers – baritone saxophone, backing vocals
- Luis Gasca – trumpet

Technical

- Alex Kazanegras, Jerry Hochman, Sy Mitchell – engineers
- Robert Crumb – artwork, cover lettering
- Bruce Steinberg – cover photograph

== Sales and certifications ==
Region	Certification	Certified units/sales
United States (RIAA)	Platinum	1,000,000^{^}
^{^} Shipments figures based on certification alone.
