= Rick Dufay =

American musician

- Born: Richard Marc Dufay; February 2, 1952 (age 74); Paris, France
- Children: Minka Kelly
- Musical career
- Genres: Hard rock, blues rock
- Occupations: Musician, songwriter
- Instrument: Guitar
- Years active: 1970s–present
- Formerly of: Aerosmith

Richard Marc Dufay (born February 2, 1952) is a French-American guitarist who played in Aerosmith in the period after Brad Whitford left the band in 1981 up to his return in 1984.

== Early life and career ==
Richard Marc Dufay was born in Paris, France.

Before joining Aerosmith, Dufay released an album called Tender Loving Abuse, produced by Aerosmith producer Jack Douglas. It was Douglas who recommended Dufay to Steven Tyler as Whitford's replacement. He joined the band after the completion of Aerosmith's 1982 album Rock in a Hard Place as well being seen in the video for "Lightning Strikes".

Dufay is credited for suggesting to Tyler that he reunite with Whitford and Joe Perry, with Joe saying in a 2023 interview: "Even Rick Dufay said, ‘Listen, you’ve gotta get those guys back in the band. This just isn’t working without them.’ Rick is a really smart, standup guy who was just telling it like he saw it. But Billie encouraged me to get together with Steven, and we hooked up and talked about Aerosmith, and it went from there."

When speaking about Dufay, Tyler said of him: "Rick Dufay was a friend of Jack’s, a guitar player, a total asshole, and we loved him, Rick just so defined what a fuckin’ asshole is. He would come up and spit in my face. He would do something brain-dead and just beg Jack to beat the shit out of him." Drummer Joey Kramer also said of Dufay: "Dufay didn’t give a shit, because for him it was all an image thing. Rick would fix his hair onstage, his guitar just hanging there loose and ringing, while Jimmy’s playing his fuckin’ heart out. It drove Jimmy to drugs."

After returning home from England in 1990, Dufay met singer Karen Lawrence and her husband, who asked him to help them with some songs they had written. This eventually led to them forming the band Blue by Nature. One of the albums released by Blue by Nature, Live at the Lake, was produced by Jack Douglas.

On Written In Stone (his second solo album released on soundclick.com) appears the Aerosmith outtake "Written In Stone" (AKA In The Bus Song). He released some free covers on his website (like Eric Clapton's "Wanna Make Love") and the rare track "Runaway".

On the Aerosmith release Music from Another Dimension!, Dufay plays on the song "Shakey Ground", which is a cover of The Temptations from 1975. This song was initially included on the main album track list, but now ultimately only appeared on the Walmart exclusive and Japanese versions of the record.

Dufay has credited blues musicians including Big Bill Broonzy, Albert King, Freddie King and Robert Johnson as his influences.

== Personal life ==
Dufay has one daughter, actress Minka Kelly. Kelly’s mother was Maureen Dumont Kelly, a former Las Vegas showgirl who died in 2008 aged 51. Dufay and Kelly met in a recording studio in 1979. Their relationship was short, and they split up when Kelly was pregnant with Minka, as Rick was concentrating on touring and recording. Dufay was absent for most of Minka's life, but the two have since reconnected and reconciled.

As of 2008, Dufay has remained on good terms with the other members of Aerosmith; he and Tyler still meet up on occasion, Dufay was jammed with Kramer and Tom Hamilton, and has been asked before by Tyler to bring his guitar and meet them whenever they are in Dufay's town.
