= The Shangri-Las =

American pop girl group

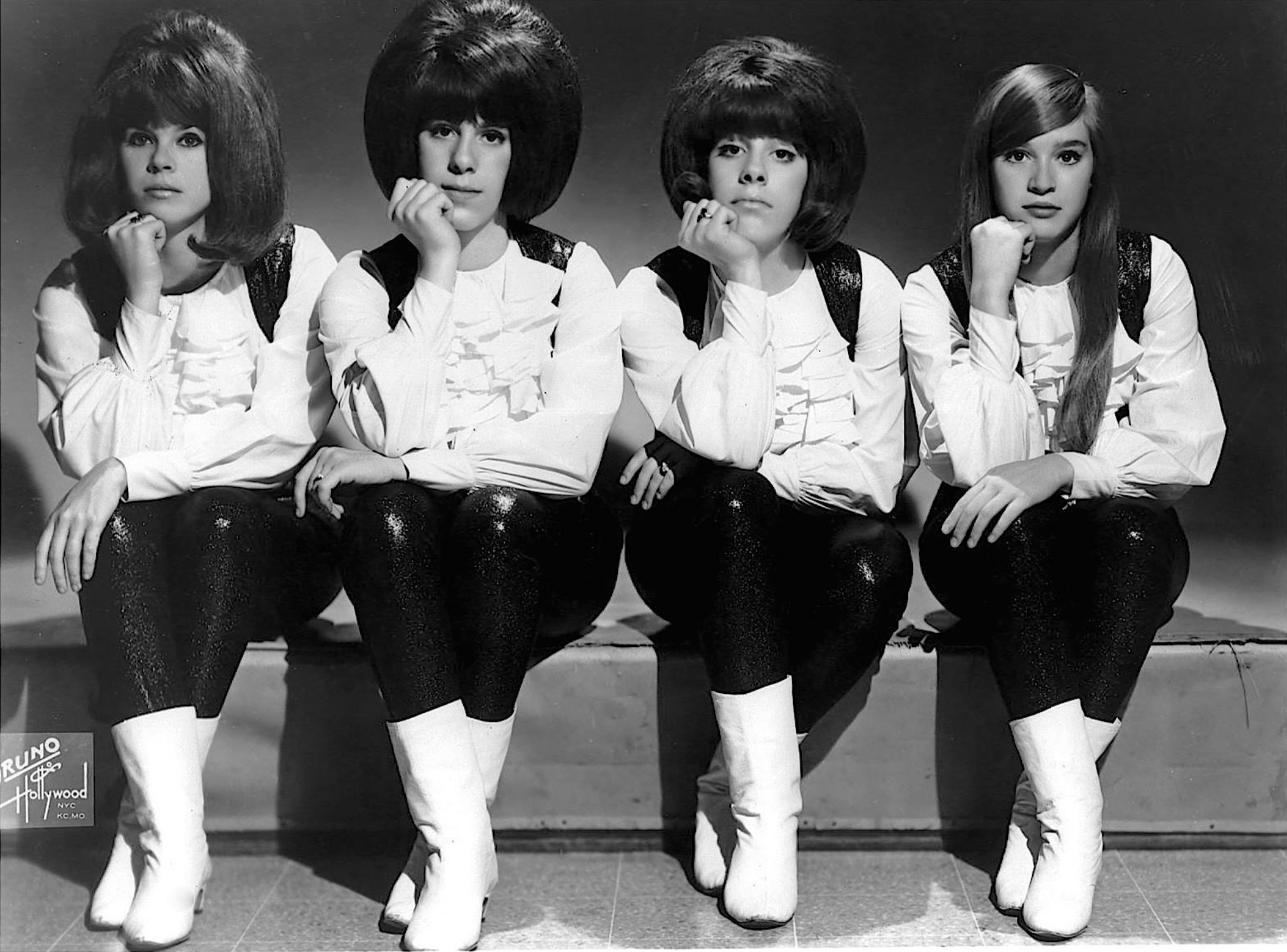
- The Shangri-Las circa 1965. Left to right: Betty Weiss, Mary Ann Ganser, Marge Ganser, Mary Weiss.

Background information
- Origin: New York City, U.S.
- Genres: Pop; proto-punk
- Years active: 1963–1968, 1977, 1989
- Labels: Red Bird; Mercury
- Past members: Mary Weiss; Elizabeth "Betty" Weiss; Marguerite "Marge" Ganser; Mary Ann Ganser

The Shangri-Las were an American girl group of the 1960s, consisting of lead singer Mary Weiss, her sister Elizabeth "Betty" Weiss and twin sisters Marguerite "Marge" Ganser and Mary Ann Ganser, though often they appeared as a trio. Between 1964 and 1966 they charted with several classics of the girl group era, all of them produced by George "Shadow" Morton, most famously "Leader of the Pack", a number one on Billboard's Hot 100 in November 1964 (and a UK hit in 1965, 1972 and 1976). Their records consistently spoke of teen heartbreak, tragedy, death and/or generational conflict, marked by melodrama and the sorrowful vocals of Mary Weiss. Defining recordings include the Top Tens "Remember (Walking in the Sand)" and "I Can Never Go Home Anymore", plus "Give Him a Great Big Kiss", "Out in the Streets", "He Cried" and "Past, Present and Future".

Following the death of Mary Weiss in 2024, Betty Weiss is the sole living member of the group, who formed in 1963 while in high school in Queens, New York City.

== Early career ==
The group was formed at Andrew Jackson High School in Cambria Heights, a neighborhood in Queens, New York City, in 1963. The group consisted of two pairs of sisters: Mary Weiss (lead singer) and Elizabeth "Betty" Weiss, and identical twins Marguerite "Marge"/"Margie" Ganser and Mary Ann Ganser.

They began playing school shows, talent shows, and teen hops; Artie Ripp heard about them and arranged the group's first record deal with Kama Sutra. Their first recording in December 1963 was "Simon Says", later issued on the Smash label, on which Betty Weiss sang lead. They also recorded "Wishing Well" / "Hate to Say I Told You So", which became their first release in early 1964, when it was leased to the small Spokane, Washington label.

Initially, the girls performed without a name for their group; however when they signed their first deal, they began to call themselves the Shangri-Las, after a restaurant in Queens. Some discographies list the Beatle-ettes and the Bon Bons, who both issued singles in 1964, as early versions of the Shangri-Las; however, they are different groups.

Mary Weiss was the main lead singer; Betty, however, took lead on "Maybe" (the LP version), "Shout", "Twist and Shout", "Wishing Well", and a number of B-sides and album tracks. Mary Ann Ganser took lead on most of "I'm Blue", which is a cover of the Ikettes' biggest hit at the time, and was included on their 1965 album Shangri-Las-65!

== Success at Red Bird Records ==
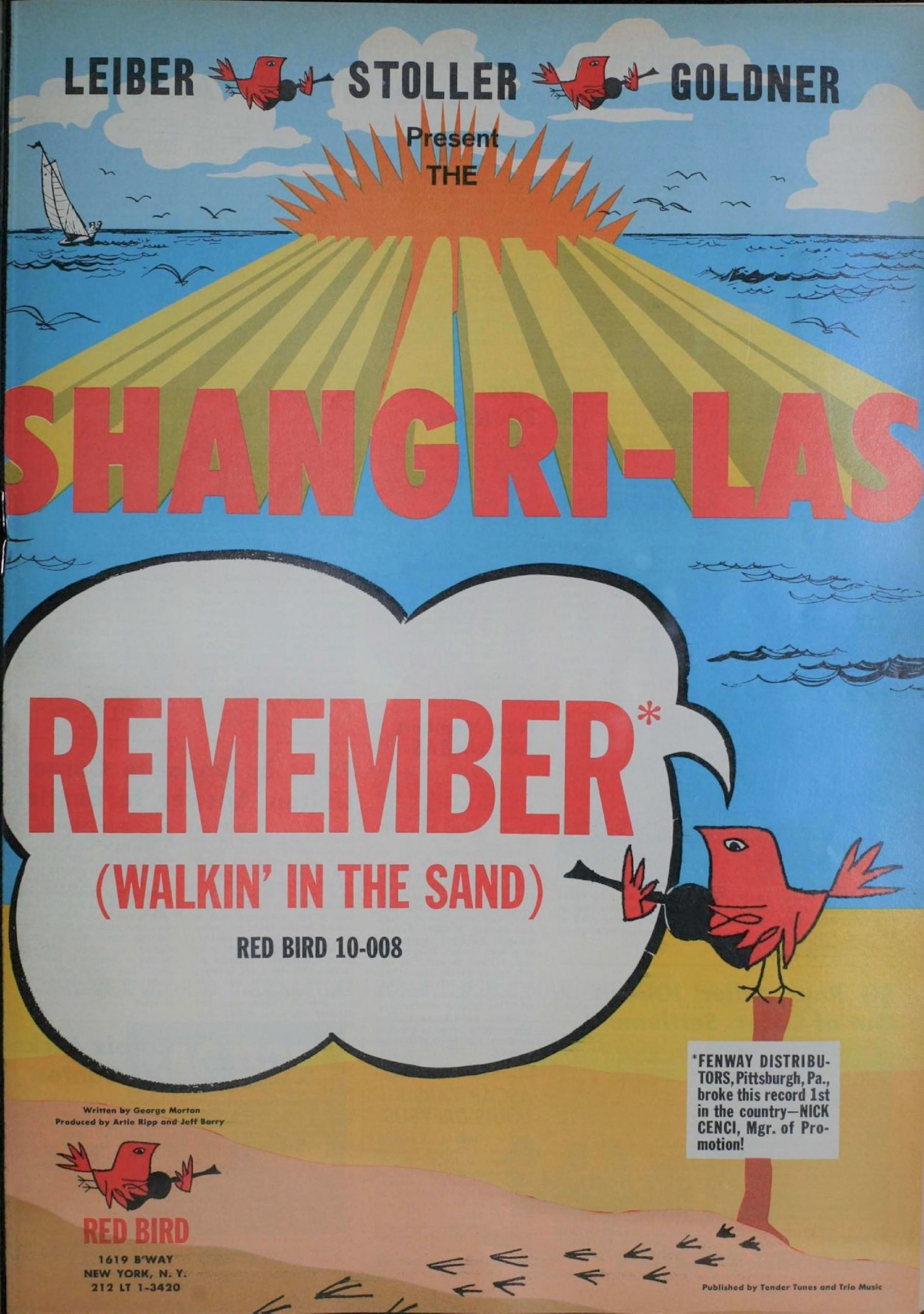
Billboard advertisement, August 15, 1964

In April 1964, while the girls were minors, their parents signed the quartet with Red Bird Records; Mary was 15, Betty was 17, and the Ganser twins were 16. Having been hired by record producer George "Shadow" Morton, they had their first success with the summer hit "Remember (Walking in the Sand)" (US number 5, UK number 14). Billy Joel, a then-unknown working as a session musician, played on the demo of "Remember (Walkin' in the Sand)". The demo was nearly seven minutes long, too long for Top 40 radio. Morton had hired the group to perform on the demo, but Red Bird released a re-recorded version. Morton faded the new version out around 2:16.

The recordings for Morton featured lavish production with heavy orchestration and sound effects, and their next and biggest hit, "Leader of the Pack" (U.S. number 1, UK number 11), climaxes with roaring motorcycles and breaking glass. UK re-issues peaked at number 3 in 1972 and number 7 in 1976. The song epitomized the "death disc"; songs with lyrics focusing on suicide, murders and fatal crashes, which were popular from the late 1950s until the mid-1960s. Jeff Barry described their songs as "audio operas" which "makes you use your imagination".

After the sudden success of "Remember (Walking in the Sand)", The Shangri Las were called upon to make personal appearances, which required them to leave high school. Mary, however, stayed on for classes at a high school for young professionals in Manhattan.

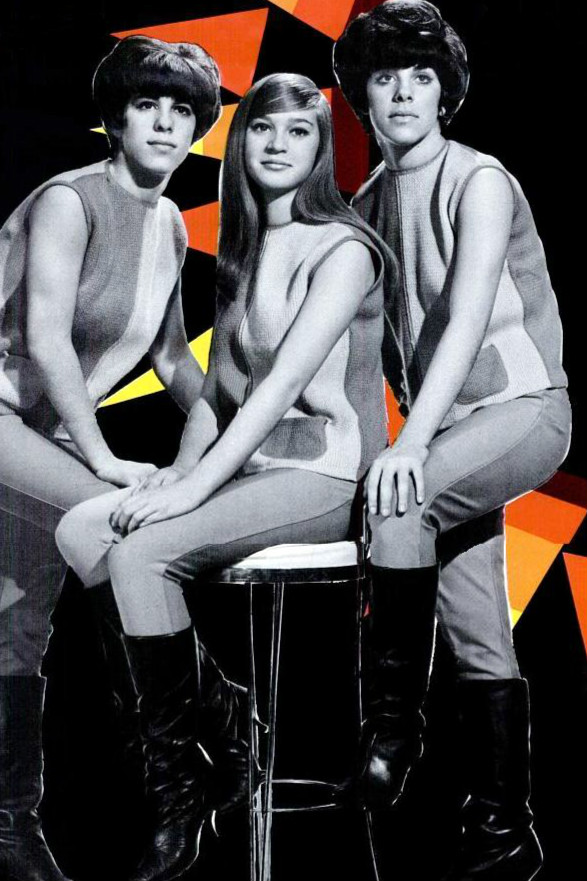
The group as a trio in 1964

By the end of 1964, the group was an established act. They performed with the Beatles, a Fall 1964 tour with the Rolling Stones, and R&B artists such as the Drifters and James Brown (who according to Mary Weiss was surprised to discover the girls were white). Cashbox magazine listed them as best new R&B group of 1964. The group was also a fixture on the Murray the K shows at the Brooklyn Fox from 1964 to 1966. They also promoted Revlon cosmetics.

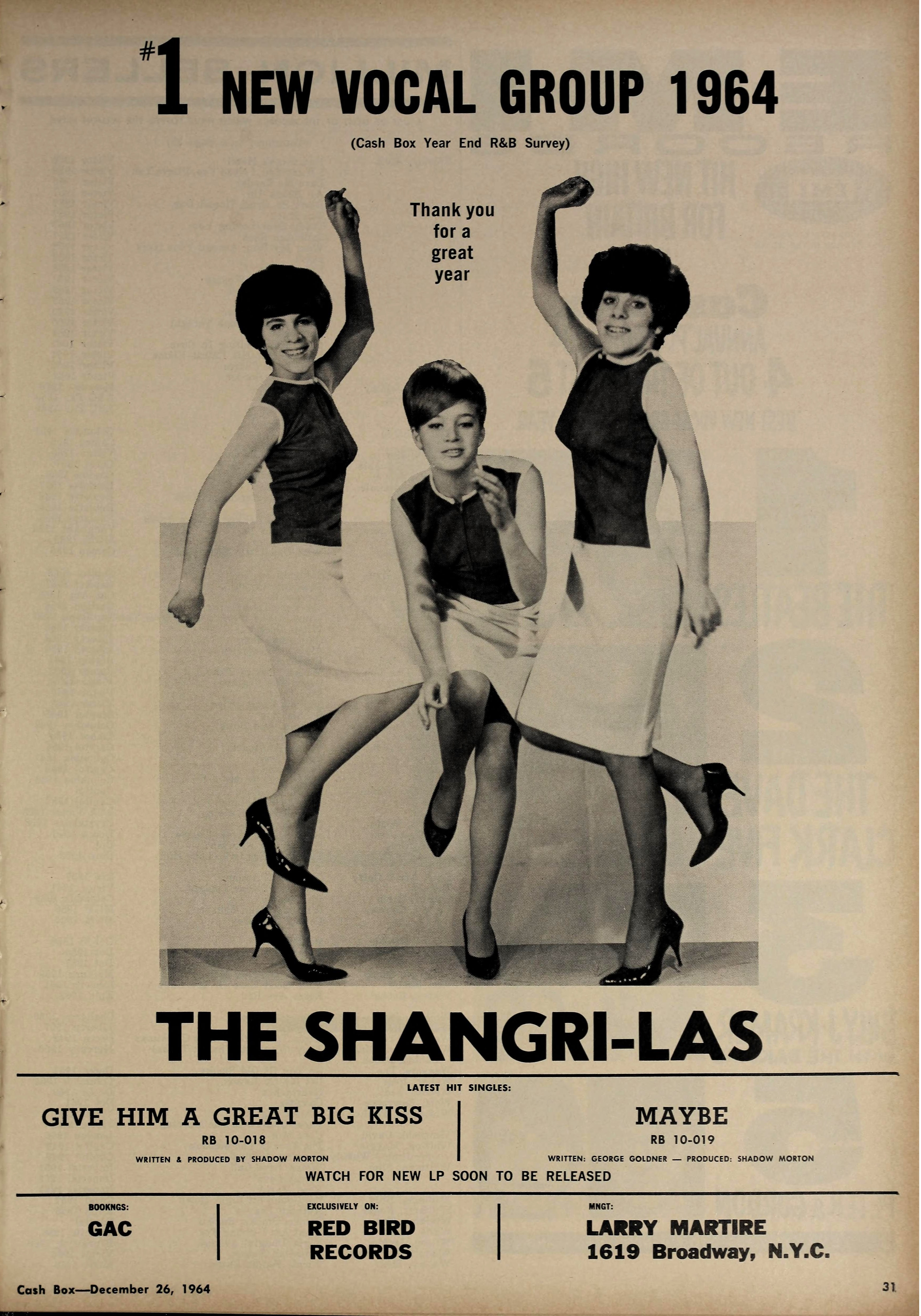
Cash Box name the Shangri-Las as best new vocal R&B group for 1964.

The Shangri-Las appeared as a quartet to promote "Remember", starting with their stint on the 1964 Labor Day Murray the K show. In October 1964, Betty Weiss dropped out temporarily, leaving the group as a trio. She is still featured on the recording for "Leader of the Pack", which was recorded prior to the release of "Remember". The trio that remained went on to tour the US and also appeared on many TV shows, including Hullabaloo, Shindig!, Hollywood a Go Go, and The Lloyd Thaxton Show. During October 1964, Mary and the Gansers did a short TV and Radio tour of the UK (their only UK appearances). Betty then rejoined the group in mid-1965 (her first return appearance with the Shangri-las was listed as a June 1965 Go Go episode hosted by Cousin Brucie in New York City), and the group appeared as a quartet once again until the start of 1966, when they permanently became a trio (Mary Ann and Marge left at different times, replacing each other until the demise of the group).

The group alternated between touring with their own band and local bands. Among the latter were the Sonics, as well as the Iguanas featuring a young Iggy Pop on drums and vocals. They also appeared as headliners on package tours such as Dick Clark's Caravan of Stars, with R&B acts like the Orlons and Joe Tex. Later in their career, the Shangri-Las performed several college dates with bands like the Young Rascals, the Animals, and Vanilla Fudge.

The Shangri-Las continued to chart with fairly successful U.S. hit records, specializing in adolescent themes such as alienation, loneliness, abandonment, and premature death. Singles included "Give Him a Great Big Kiss", "Out in the Streets", "Give Us Your Blessings", the top ten hit "I Can Never Go Home Anymore", "Long Live Our Love" (a rare example of a song dedicated to the men at the time fighting overseas in Vietnam), "He Cried" and the spoken-word "Past, Present, and Future", featuring a musical backdrop inspired by Beethoven's "Moonlight Sonata". Noteworthy B-sides included "Heaven Only Knows", "The Train from Kansas City", "Dressed in Black" (featured in the Amy Winehouse biopic Back to Black) and "Paradise" (written by Harry Nilsson, Phil Spector, Perry Botkin Jr. and Gil Garfield).

Popular songs include "I Can Never Go Home Anymore", the story of a girl who leaves home for a boy; her pride keeps her from returning to her mother who "grew so lonely in the end/the angels picked her for their friend". Lines from "Give Him a Great Big Kiss" include "When I say I'm in love, you best believe I'm in love, L-U-V", and "Well I hear he's bad." "Hmm, he's good-bad, but he's not evil." "Past, Present, and Future" has been said to be about rape, something Weiss disagrees with. She has said it is about "teenage angst", heartbreak, and "being hurt and angsty and not wanting anyone near you."

== Public image ==
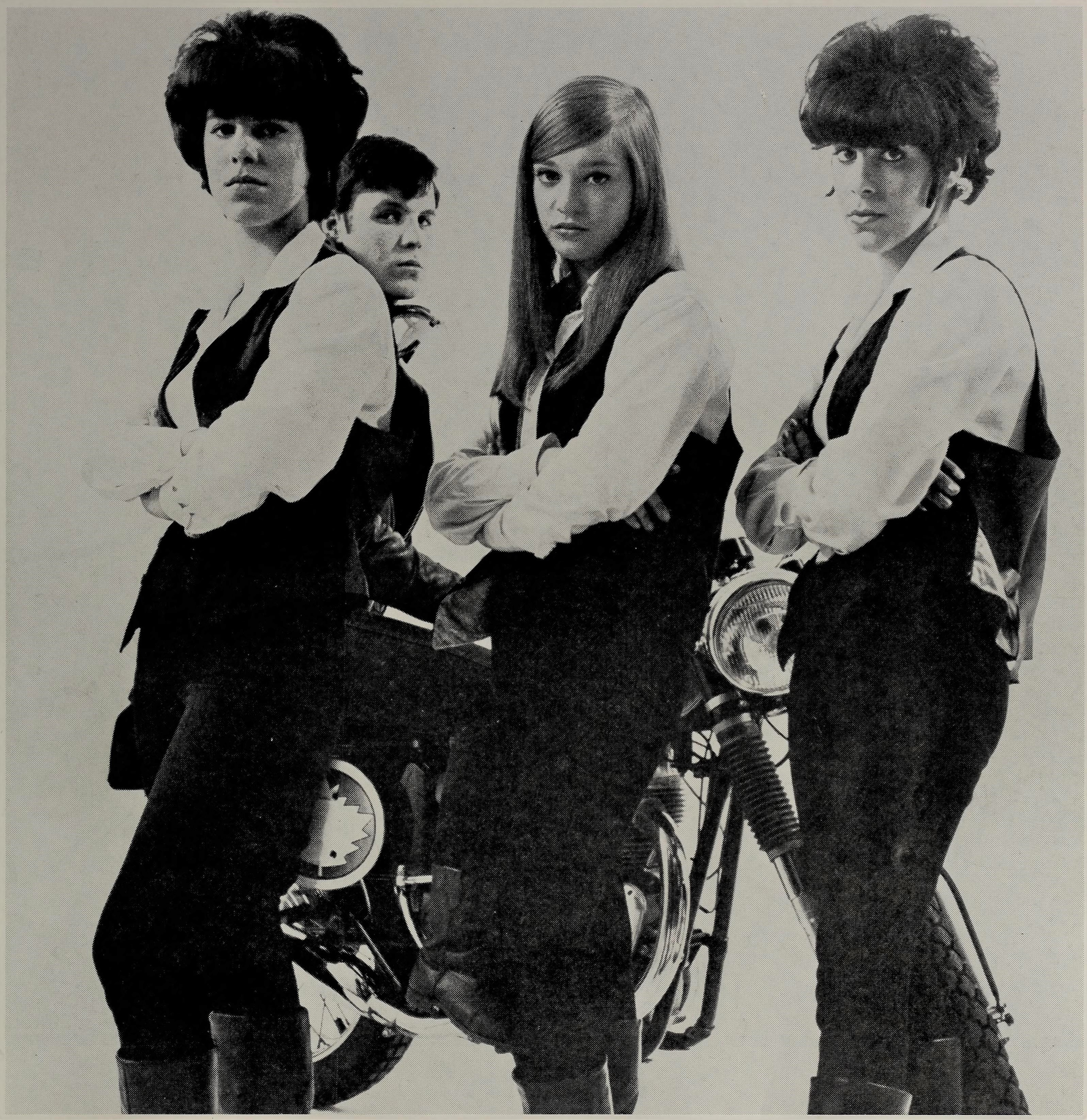
The Shangri-Las on the cover of Cash Box, February 13, 1965

The Shangri-Las' "tough girl" persona set them apart from other girl groups. From a blue collar area of Queens, they were less demure than their contemporaries. Rumors about supposed escapades have since become legend; for example, the story that Mary Weiss attracted the attention of the FBI for transporting a firearm across state lines. Weiss said that someone had attempted to break into her hotel room one night, and she bought a pistol for protection. Stories such as this were believed by fans in the 1960s, and they helped cement the group's bad-girl reputation. According to Weiss, that persona helped fend off advances from musicians on tours.

== Disintegration and retirement ==
The group appeared on several TV shows and continued to tour the US, but in 1966, two of three releases on Red Bird Records failed to crack the U.S. top 50, though the group remained popular in England and Japan. Mary Ann Ganser left, but returned early in 1967 when Marge – the most outspoken member, sometimes considered the leader – left. Red Bird Records had folded. The group recorded more tracks with Shadow Morton producing (some of which remain unreleased) and signed with Mercury Records. However, Morton had begun working with Janis Ian and Vanilla Fudge, and Mercury had little enthusiasm for the group. During their Mercury stint, the Shangri-Las had no further hits; in 1968, they disbanded, amid litigation.

All the Shangri-Las withdrew from the spotlight. Morton said, "The Shangri-Las vacated, they vanished". Reportedly they were angry that they had received few royalties despite the millions of records they had sold.

== Lives after the Shangri-Las ==
Mary Weiss moved to New York's Greenwich Village and then to San Francisco. Returning to Manhattan a few years later and prevented from recording because of lawsuits, she worked as a secretary while taking college classes. She then worked in the accounting department of a New York architectural firm. Weiss moved up to be the chief purchasing agent and later ran a commercial furniture dealership. In the late 1980s she managed a furniture store and was an interior designer. By 2001, she was a furniture consultant to New York businesses. She married in 1974, but the marriage ended in 1988; she married again several years later, and her second husband managed her music career until their divorce. In March 2007, Norton Records released a solo album by Mary Weiss (backed by garage rockers the Reigning Sound) titled Dangerous Game. She performed in the United States, Spain, and France. Mary Weiss died in Palm Springs, California on January 19, 2024, at age 75 of chronic obstructive pulmonary disease and is survived by her third husband.

Mary Ann Ganser began to have problems with drug and alcohol addiction in 1968. She died in Queens on March 16, 1970, aged 22, of a drug overdose. This may have been a heroin overdose as mentioned in a contemporary newspaper report and on her death certificate, or a barbiturate overdose as related later by her mother to a journalist. Her death has been incorrectly reported as having been caused by encephalitis, or by a seizure disorder.

Marge Ganser reportedly returned to school in the late 1960s. By the early 1970s, she married (changing her name to Marguerite Ganser Dorste), worked for NYNEX in Valley Stream, New York, and died of breast cancer on July 28, 1996, at age 48.

Betty Weiss had a daughter in 1964, necessitating her absence from the group during this period. She was the only member of the group to have a child (who was raised with the help of Betty's brother George Weiss, who died in 1998). Betty Weiss also married and held several jobs and now lives and works on Long Island.

== Reunion ==
The group declined offers to perform throughout the 1970s, although they did have a few live performances. Following the successful re-issue of "Leader of the Pack" in the UK in 1976, which renewed interest in the group, Mary and Betty Weiss and Marge Ganser reunited. Contacting Seymour Stein of Sire Records, they spent summer 1977 in New York with producer Andy Paley. Paley said the sessions went well, but they weren't satisfied with all the material, and declined to release the record. The tapes are now owned by the Warner Music Group. They did, however, give a live performance at CBGB; Paley put together a band, including Lenny Kaye, and after two hours of rehearsal, the Shangri-Las returned to the stage for the first time in a decade. Although the Sire sessions came to naught, the group toyed with signing to another label; however, they were put off by the insistence of record executives that they be a disco vocal group, the musical trend of the day. Mary said she envisioned the Shangri-Las like punk singer Patti Smith. Eventually, the Shangri-Las split up again.

Since the 1980s, a trio has been performing under the name the Shangri-Las, although unconnected with the original group. The copycat act was put together by Dick Fox, who claimed to have bought the rights to the name, and resulted in legal action from both sides, largely due to a video tape of the new Shangri-Las claiming in public to be the original group. The original group performed for the last time at a reunion show hosted by Cousin Brucie (Bruce Morrow) in East Rutherford, New Jersey, on June 3, 1989.

== Influence ==
The streetwise image of the Shangri-Las – initially a promotional device for "Leader of the Pack" – contrasted with other "girl groups" of the 1960s, and they were cited as an influence by 1970s punk rock-era acts such as the New York Dolls, Ramones and Blondie; the latter covered "Out in the Streets" twice. British punk band The Damned released their debut single, "New Rose", in 1976. It was the first ever single released by a British punk band and the intro to the song featured a deadpan quote by singer Dave Vanian of the line "Is she really going out with him?" from "Leader of the Pack".

Johnny Thunders covered "Great Big Kiss" on his 1978 solo album So Alone.

Aerosmith released a rock style version of "Remember (Walking in the Sand)" featuring uncredited backing vocals by Mary Weiss on their 1979 album, Night in the Ruts. The song was released as a single and charted on the Billboard Hot 100 at number 67. It was also featured on their 1980 Greatest Hits album.

The Shangri-las were referenced by Paul McCartney in a McCartney II sessions track, "Mr H Atom"/"You Know I'll Get You Baby", recorded in 1979, but not released until 2011.

Scottish alternative rock band The Jesus and Mary Chain cited the Shangri-Las as an early influence. In 1985, the band's guitarist William Reid stated: "We all love the Shangri-Las, and one day we're going to make Shangri-Las records."

The Shangri-Las are referenced in John Mellencamp's 1985 single "R.O.C.K. in the U.S.A." from his third album Scarecrow.

Singer-songwriter Jim Steinman spoke on the influence The Shangri-Las had on him creating the all girl group Pandora's Box during his video promotion for the 1989 album Original Sin.

In 1992, The Beach Boys recorded a cover of "Remember (Walking in the Sand)" on their poorly received album, Summer in Paradise.

In Revolution in the Head, music critic Ian MacDonald suggests the bridge of the Beatles' 1995 single "Free as a Bird" borrows from the verse of "Remember (Walking in the Sand)"; the lyric "Whatever happened to/ the boy that I once knew" becoming "Whatever happened to/ the life that we once knew".

The Sonic Youth song "Little Trouble Girl" from their 1995 album Washing Machine was influenced by the Shangri-Las, and according to Kim Gordon "was my ultimate homage to the Shangri-Las half singing, half speaking style." Gordon also noted in her 2015 memoir Girl in a Band that "I was always a big fan of early songs by the Shangri-Las, with their whispered, almost spoken-word approach leading up to a violent climax, such as in 'Leader of the Pack' or 'I Can Never Go Home Anymore'."

Kathleen Hanna of the electropunk group Le Tigre has mentioned that the "one girl calling another" motif and the opening sound of seagulls on the 1999 track "What's Yr Take on Cassavetes?" were inspired by the Shangri-Las.

British singer Amy Winehouse cited the Shangri-Las as an influence for her second album Back to Black (2006) and occasionally integrated the hook lyrics from "Remember (Walking in the Sand)" into the bridge of her song "Back to Black" during live performances. Winehouse called "I Can Never Go Home Anymore" the "saddest song in the world".

In the 2015 documentary Wider Horizons, David Gilmour, guitarist for Pink Floyd, cited the Shangri-Las as an influence, saying their music "painted aural pictures".

While recording her 2017 album Lust for Life, American singer Lana Del Rey was heavily influenced by the Shangri-Las.

Despite their influence on multiple Rock and Roll Hall of Fame inductees and having their song Leader of the Pack inducted in the Rock Hall, the Shangri-Las themselves have never been nominated for induction.

== Members ==
- Mary Weiss (1963–1968, 1977, 1989; died 2024)
- Marguerite "Marge" Ganser (1963–1967, 1977, 1989; died 1996)
- Mary Ann Ganser (1963–1966, 1967–1968; died 1970)
- Elizabeth "Betty" Weiss (1963–1964, 1965–1968, 1977, 1989)

== Discography ==
=== Studio albums ===
Title	Album details	Peak chart positions		
Title	Album details	US Billboard	US Cashbox	US Record World
Leader of the Pack	Released: February 1965; Label: Red Bird (RB 20-101)	109	91	67
Shangri-Las-65!	Released: September 1965; Label: Red Bird (RB 20-104); First pressing includes "The Dum Dum Ditty", replaced in second pressing with "I Can Never Go Home Anymore"	—	103	108

=== Compilation albums ===
- 1966: Golden Hits of the Shangri-Las
- 1975: The Shangri-Las Sing
- 1986: The Dixie Cups Meet the Shangri-Las
- 1994: Myrmidons of Melodrama
- 1996: The Best of the Shangri-Las
- 2002: Myrmidons of Melodrama (Re-issue)
- 2008: Remembered
- 2008: Greatest Hits
- 2009: The Complete Collection

=== Singles ===
Year	Title	Label	Catalogue number	Peak chart positions						Album
Year	Title	Label	Catalogue number	US Hot100	US Cashbox	US Record World	CAN	UK	South Africa	Album
1963	"Simon Says" (As The Shangra-Las) b/w "Simon Speaks"	Smash	S-1866	—	—	—	—	—	—	Non-album singles
1964	"Wishing Well" b/w "Hate to Say I Told You So"	Spokane	45–4006	—	—	—	—	—	—	Non-album singles
1964	"Remember (Walking in the Sand)" b/w "It's Easier to Cry"	Red Bird	RB 10-008	5	5	4	2	14	—	Leader of the Pack
1964	"Leader of the Pack" b/w "What is Love?"	Red Bird	RB 10-014	1	1	1	3	11	—	Leader of the Pack
1964	"Give Him a Great Big Kiss" b/w "Twist and Shout"	Red Bird	RB 10-018	18	15	14	9	—	—	Leader of the Pack
1964	"Maybe" b/w "Shout"	Red Bird	RB 10-019	91	107	112	18	—	—	Leader of the Pack
1965	"Wishing Well" (reissue) b/w "Hate to Say I Told You So"	Specter	1291	—	—	—	—	—	—	Non-album single
1965	"Out in the Streets" b/w "The Boy"	Red Bird	RB 10-025	53	73	72	6	—	—	Shangri-Las-65!
1965	"Give Us Your Blessings" b/w "Heaven Only Knows"	Red Bird	RB 10-030	29	33	30	21	—	—	Shangri-Las-65!
1965	"Right Now and Not later" b/w "The Train from Kansas City"	Red Bird	RB 10-036	99	150	106	—	—	—	Shangri-Las-65!
1965	"I Can Never Go Home Anymore" b/w "Bulldog" (from Leader of the Pack) or “Sophiaticated Boom Boom”	Red Bird	RB 10-043	6	7	5	2	—	—	Shangri-Las-65! (Second pressing only) and I Can Never Go Home Anymore
1966	"Long Live Our Love" b/w "Sophisticated Boom Boom" (from Shangri-Las-65!)	Red Bird	RB 10-048	33	35	38	9	—	—	Golden Hits of The Shangri-Las
1966	"He Cried" b/w "Dressed in Black"	Red Bird	RB 10-053	65	60	54	45	—	—	Non-album single
1966	"Past, Present and Future" b/w "Paradise" or "Love You More Than Yesterday" (both non-album tracks)	Red Bird	RB 10-068	59	78	57	48	—	—	Golden Hits of The Shangri-Las
1966	"The Sweet Sound of Summer" b/w "I'll Never Learn"	Mercury	72645 (US) / MF 962 (UK)	123	143	144	—	—	—	Non-album singles
1967	"Take the Time" b/w "Footsteps on the Roof"	Mercury	72670 (US) / MF 979 (UK)	—	—	—	—	—	—	Non-album singles
1972	"Leader of the Pack" (reissue) b/w "Remember (Walking in the Sand)"	Kama Sutra	2013 024 (UK)	—	—	—	—	3	17	Leader of the Pack
1976	"Leader of the Pack" (reissue) b/w "Give Him a Great Big Kiss"	Charly	CS 1009	—	—	—	—	7	—	Leader of the Pack
"—" denotes release did not chart.
