= Lightning Strikes (Aerosmith song) =

Single by Aerosmith

from the album Rock in a Hard Place
- Released: August 27, 1982
- Recorded: 1981
- Genre: Hard rock, heavy metal
- Length: 4:26
- Label: Columbia
- Songwriter: Richie Supa
- Producers: Jack Douglas; Steven Tyler

Music video
- "Lightning Strikes" on YouTube

"Lightning Strikes" is a song by the American hard rock band Aerosmith from their 1982 album Rock in a Hard Place. It is notable as Aerosmith's only charting song from the lineup without guitarist Joe Perry, who was replaced by Jimmy Crespo after he left the band in 1979.

The song was written by Richie Supa, a friend and collaborator of the band. Aerosmith guitarist Brad Whitford recorded his parts before leaving the band.

The song reached #21 on the U.S. Mainstream Rock Tracks chart.

== Music video ==
The band created one of their earliest actual music videos for MTV and other networks with this song. The music video was directed by Arnold Levine. It flashes back and forth between the band performing in what appears to be a studio or small venue and then out on the streets, where the band members flash angry looks, and wield baseball bats, chains, knives, and other weapons, suggesting a fight is about to take place. The song also features fake lightning strikes during the transitions between the band's performance and the streets, and baseball bats striking melons in the air.

== Personnel ==
- Steven Tyler – lead vocals, keyboards
- Jimmy Crespo – lead guitar, backing vocals
- Tom Hamilton – bass guitar
- Joey Kramer – drums
- Brad Whitford – rhythm guitar
