= Rock in a Hard Place =

Studio album by Aerosmith
- Released: August 27, 1982
- Recorded: 1981–1982
- Studios: Power Station, New York City; Criteria, Miami
- Genre: Hard rock
- Length: 40:16
- Label: Columbia
- Producers: Jack Douglas; Steven Tyler; Tony Bongiovi

Aerosmith chronology
Night in the Ruts (1979)	Rock in a Hard Place (1982)	Done with Mirrors (1985)

Singles from Rock in a Hard Place
- 1. "Lightning Strikes" Released: 1982; 2. "Bitch's Brew" Released: December 1982

Rock in a Hard Place is the seventh studio album by American hard rock band Aerosmith, released on August 27, 1982, by Columbia Records. It was certified gold on November 10, 1989. It is the only Aerosmith album not to feature guitarist Joe Perry, following his departure from the band in 1979. Fellow guitarist Brad Whitford also left during the recording in 1981. The band spent $1.5 million on the recording of this album, which saw them reunited with producer Jack Douglas.

== Background ==
Aerosmith had released six studio albums during the 1970s. But as the decade concluded, multiple problems arose. Guitarist Joe Perry had left the band in 1979 after incidents at the World Series of Rock in Cleveland, Ohio and was replaced by Jimmy Crespo. Meanwhile, Steven Tyler's drug abuse increased. After recording the single "Lightning Strikes", guitarist Brad Whitford also left Aerosmith in 1981 and was replaced by Rick Dufay.

Guitarist Dufay recalls the difficulty in completing the album in a 2008 interview: "They tried to make that album for two years but Steven couldn't finish stuff and they had trouble with their original producer but once they got Jack and me on board, we were just pushing it. When we went down to Florida, Steven was way too fucked up to do anything, he was nodding off when he was trying to write lyrics and I said to Jack that we had to get him out and get him together. It took about two or three months and we pretty much nursed him back to health. We got him off the hard stuff, sat in the sun and had some laughs and I established a bond with him. It's pretty well documented on the Behind the Music show. He was pretty sick and I just took care of him and even had to wipe his ass for him!"

An outtake from the album titled “Riff & Roll” was released on their 1991 box set, Pandora's Box.

== Critical reception ==
Professional ratings
Review scores
Source	Rating
AllMusic	1.5/5 stars
Classic Rock	3.5/5 stars
Collector's Guide to Heavy Metal	8/10
The Encyclopedia of Popular Music	2/5 stars
The Philadelphia Inquirer	1/5 stars
Rolling Stone	2/5 stars
The Rolling Stone Album Guide	1/5 stars
Sounds	5/5 stars

From contemporary reviews, J. D. Considine lamented in Rolling Stone how the band had decided to maintain their old sound on the album in spite of the heavier direction of mainstream rock music in the early 1980s, stating that "fast power chords had made Aerosmith's bluesy boogie almost obsolete". He praised "Perry lookalike Jimmy Crespo"'s guitar playing, but wrote that "despite an occasional burst of primal energy, much of the LP rocks by rote." Ken Tucker of The Philadelphia Inquirer gave the album a one out of five star rating, opining that "It's sad when once-vital hard rock bands outlast their usefulness, if only because there are so few of them around."

AllMusic Greg Prato wrote that Aerosmith "didn't possess the magical chemistry of their '70s classics" without Perry and Whitford, but the band could "still rock out" producing their "most studio-enhanced and experimental record up to this point" with "a few pleasant surprises", like "the psychedelicized 'Joanie's Butterfly'". Canadian journalist Martin Popoff described the album as "a bit patchy" with highlights being "Jailbait", "Lightning Strikes" and "Joanie's Butterfly" and the rest "variously lumbering, untuneful and forced", and concluded that, although Aerosmith "could barely function", they "never made a bad record." "In theory a disaster," observed Classic Rock magazine, "in practice, an unlikely triumph. Never mind the Spinal Tap-anticipating Stonehenge cover – Rock in a Hard Place is one kick-ass album… 'Lightning Strikes', 'Bolivian Ragamuffin' and 'Joanie's Butterfly' are classic Aerosmith songs – no matter who played on them."

"The record doesn't suck," wrote drummer Joey Kramer in his 2009 autobiography, Hit Hard: A Story of Hitting Rock Bottom at the Top. "There's some real good stuff on it. But it's not a real Aerosmith record because it's just me, Steven, and Tom [Hamilton] — with a fill-in guitar player ... It's Jimmy Crespo doing the guitar work."

== Track listing ==
Side one
No.	Title	Writer(s)	Length
1.	"Jailbait"	Steven Tyler, Jimmy Crespo	4:38
2.	"Lightning Strikes"	Richard Supa	4:26
3.	"Bitch's Brew"	Tyler, Crespo	4:14
4.	"Bolivian Ragamuffin"	Tyler, Crespo	3:32
5.	"Cry Me a River"	Arthur Hamilton	4:06

Side two
No.	Title	Writer(s)	Length
6.	"Prelude to Joanie"	Tyler	1:21
7.	"Joanie's Butterfly"	Tyler, Crespo, Jack Douglas	5:35
8.	"Rock in a Hard Place (Cheshire Cat)"	Tyler, Crespo, Douglas	4:46
9.	"Jig Is Up"	Tyler, Crespo	3:10
10.	"Push Comes to Shove"	Tyler	4:28
Total length:			40:16

== Personnel ==
Aerosmith

- Steven Tyler – vocals, keyboards, harmonica, percussion, piano on "Push Comes to Shove", producer
- Jimmy Crespo – lead & rhythm guitar
- Tom Hamilton – bass
- Joey Kramer – drums
- Rick Dufay – rhythm guitar (credit only)

Additional musicians

- Brad Whitford – rhythm guitar on "Lightning Strikes"
- Paul Harris – piano on "Push Comes to Shove"
- John Turi – saxophone on "Rock in a Hard Place (Cheshire Cat)"
- Reinhard Straub – violin on "Joanie's Butterfly"
- John Lievano – acoustic guitar on "Joanie's Butterfly"
- Jack Douglas – percussion, producer, additional engineer

Production

- Godfrey Diamond – chief engineer
- Tony Bongiovi – co-producer, additional engineer
- John Agnello, Bruce Hensal, Jim Sessody, Gary Rindfuss, Josh Abbey, Malcolm Pollack, Zoe Yanakis – assistant engineers
- George Marino – mastering at Sterling Sound, New York
- Gerard Rozhek – photography, visual direction

== Charts ==
Chart (1982)	Peak position
Canada Top Albums/CDs (RPM)	24
US Billboard 200	32

== Certifications ==
Region	Certification	Certified units/sales
Canada (Music Canada)	Gold	50,000^{^}
United States (RIAA)	Gold	500,000^{^}
^{^} Shipments figures based on certification alone.

== Bibliography ==
- Huxley, Martin (2015). Aerosmith: The Fall and the Rise of Rock's Greatest Band. St. Martin's Publishing Group. ISBN 978-1250096531.
