= Jimmy Crespo =

American musician

- Born: James Crespo Jr. July 5, 1954 (age 72); Brooklyn, New York, US
- Genres: Hard rock, blues rock
- Occupations: Musician, songwriter
- Instrument: Guitar
- Years active: 1968–present
- Website: www.jimmycrespo.com

Jimmy Crespo (born July 5, 1954) is an American guitarist. He was the lead guitarist for Aerosmith from 1979 until 1984. He co-wrote "Rock in a Hard Place" with Steven Tyler, and has performed or recorded with Rod Stewart, Billy Squier, Meat Loaf, Stevie Nicks, Robert Fleischman, Rough Cutt, Renegade, Flame and others.

== Early life and career ==
Jimmy Crespo was born in Brooklyn and raised by Puerto Rican-American parents (Jaime and Carmen) within a musical family. He has one brother, John Crespo. Crespo first took up the guitar at age 14. He joined his first band, The Knomes, shortly afterward. During his teenage years he became an accomplished guitarist, influenced by the stylings of such artists as The Yardbirds, Cream, The Beatles and Jimi Hendrix. Forming the New York club band Anaconda, Crespo drew the attention of industry figures, leading to session work with a number of high-profile artists such as Meat Loaf and Stevie Nicks, before he was recruited as lead guitarist and songwriter by producer Jimmy Iovine for the RCA-signed band Flame, which was fronted by powerful lead vocalist Marge Raymond. Flame released two albums: Queen of the Neighborhood in 1977 and Flame in 1978.

== Aerosmith years ==
Returning to session work following the breakup of Flame, Crespo attracted the attention of Aerosmith's management following the departure of Joe Perry from the band in 1979. Invited to audition for the vacant lead guitarist position, Crespo was asked to join Aerosmith in October 1979. Contributing a guitar solo to the song "Three Mile Smile" for the already recorded Night in the Ruts album, Crespo commenced touring with the band soon after joining. The tour was hampered by the increasingly erratic state of the band's singer, Steven Tyler, at this stage heavily beset by drug addiction and suffering several on-stage collapses. Drummer Joey Kramer formed a band called Renegade during this time, and he recruited Marge Raymond to sing lead and front the band. Jimmy Crespo, Tom Hamilton and Bob Mayo completed the line-up. An album was recorded at the Power Station in New York and was produced by Tony Bongiovi, but it has never been released. Renegade is somewhat of a legend in the music industry and the tapes are much sought after by fans. Tyler, after realizing that Renegade was buzzing the industry and about to take off, came back to fulfill his contractual obligation to CBS. Renegade is referred to in several Aerosmith autobiographies. Crespo and Tyler soon forged a songwriting partnership. Crespo co-wrote Aerosmith's 1982 album Rock in a Hard Place with Tyler.

Charting at number 37 on the US Billboard chart, Rock in a Hard Place reportedly cost over $1 million in production costs, featuring a plethora of production and engineering staff amongst its credits. Xavier Russell said of it in Sounds: "As soon as the needle hit the wax, it melted and the speaker covers blew across the living room floor." Commercial difficulties during pre-production of the band's next album coupled with Tyler's new manager's desire for him to reconvene with Perry led Crespo to exit the band in mid-1984, as the "classic" 1971–1979 Aerosmith lineup re-formed. Crespo is credited by Aerosmith and fans for keeping Aerosmith together. Crespo went on to join band Adam Bomb through the remainder of 1984 and into 1985.

== Post-Aerosmith ==
Following his time in Aerosmith, Crespo was a member of Adam Bomb, a Geffen Records-signed band: Crespo contributed guitar to the Adam Bomb album Fatal Attraction (Geffen 1985) before settling in Los Angeles with new wife Cynthia, whom he married in 1985.

Crespo joined bassist Danny Sheridan and Bonnie Bramlett in their new band Bandaloo Doctors from 1987 to 1992 and returned to session work, as well as touring and recording with Billy Squier for several years. From 1994 to 1996, Crespo toured with Rod Stewart as lead guitarist.

Crespo was part of Paul Shortino's The Cutt (a revamped new formation of Shortino's Rough Cutt) who released the LP Sacred Place in 2002 before disbanding.

Continuing to play as a studio musician, Crespo has also performed at some of Las Vegas's biggest casinos, whilst also engineering a rock amplifier simulator ("Rock Amp Legends by Jimmy Crespo") for Nomad Factory. He is working on a new album, The Jimmy Crespo Project. Crespo performed with the HitMen All Stars featuring former members of Boston, Dire Straits, Journey, Fleetwood Mac and Night Ranger. He also is part of The Rod Experience, a project with the drummer Carmine Appice. There was also reported news of a solo project.

== Selected discography ==
=== with Flame ===
- Queen of the Neighborhood LP RCA (1977)
- Flame LP RCA (1978)

=== with Aerosmith ===
- Night in the Ruts (1979) (Track 5)
- Rock in a Hard Place (1982)
- Classics Live I (1986) (Tracks 1, 3, & 5–7)

=== with Adam Bomb ===
- Fatal Attraction (1985)

=== with Paul Shortino's The Cutt ===
- Sacred Place (MusicWorks, 2002, evolved from the EP Sneak Peek of 2000)

=== with JJT ===
- JJT (recorded around 2005, released 2015)
