= Shadow Morton =

American record producer and songwriter (1941–2013)

George "Shadow" Morton
- Birth name: George Francis Morton
- Born: September 3, 1941; Richmond, Virginia, US
- Died: February 14, 2013 (aged 71); Laguna Beach, California, US
- Occupation(s): Songwriter, record producer

George Francis "Shadow" Morton (September 3, 1941 – February 14, 2013) was an American record producer and songwriter best known for his influential work in the 1960s. In particular, he was noted for writing and producing "Remember (Walking in the Sand)", "Leader of the Pack", and other hits for girl group the Shangri-Las.

== Early life ==
He was born in Richmond, Virginia, United States, and raised in Hicksville, Long Island, where he met his high school sweetheart and future wife, Lois Berman, and formed a doo-wop group, the Markeys. In the late 1950s Morton wrote and recorded for The Markeys, including two singles for RCA Victor. He became friendly with Ellie Greenwich, and did drop-in visits to her and her songwriting partner and husband Jeff Barry when they were working at the Brill Building.

== Career ==
According to a Biography episode on various 1960s Brill Building pop songwriters, which included interviews with Greenwich, Barry and Morton among others, Barry said that at the time he was suspicious of Morton's overt attention to Greenwich. Skeptical that Morton was really the songwriter he claimed to be, Barry challenged Morton to prove his legitimacy and bring in samples of his recent work (expecting never to hear again from the unheard-of Morton). Morton stated in his interview that, with an empty song portfolio at the time, he felt sufficiently challenged by Barry, whereupon he left the Brill Building and drove to a Long Island beach. Full of inspiration and determination, Morton spent the evening writing most of his first song "Remember (Walking In The Sand)" while sitting in the dark in his parked car, and the rest of it in the shower back home before heading back to Barry. Morton then 'rolled the dice' and recorded a demo of his song at Long Island's Ultrasonic Recording Studios with an unknown local girl-group that he admired, The Shangri-Las (according to Morton, with the then-unknown Billy Joel on piano in the demo recording), and offered the demo recording to Jerry Leiber, who was then setting up Red Bird Records. "Remember (Walking In The Sand)" reached number 5 on the US Billboard Hot 100 in 1964. This accomplishment transformed Morton overnight from a credential-less industry 'wannabe' into a hit songwriter and producer. According to Steve Kurutz at Allmusic, "Morton's production work, which included brilliant sound effects and inventive percussion, carried the Shangri-Las to girl-group history."

Morton signed on as a staff producer for Red Bird Records. He was nicknamed "Shadow" by record company executive George Goldner because his whereabouts could never be pinned down. He was a key architect in creating the girl group sound of the mid-1960s, by continuing to write and produce hit teen melodramas for the Shangri-Las and the Goodies, including "Leader of the Pack", "Give Him a Great Big Kiss", "I Can Never Go Home Anymore", "Past, Present and Future" and "Sophisticated Boom Boom". These juxtaposed teen lyrics against a mixture of pop, R&B and even the classics, with sound effects and inventive percussion that were often compared to the work of Phil Spector and his Wall of Sound technique; Billy Joel believed that Morton wanted to be Spector's equivalent in the East Coast.

In 1967, his successes continued after the collapse of Red Bird when his production of Janis Ian's "Society's Child" became a hit record. The same year, he discovered a group called Mark Stein & the Pigeons, who became Vanilla Fudge, and produced their first three albums, which included their hit version of "You Keep Me Hangin' On", followed by a foray into aural collage called The Beat Goes On. The experimentation was largely Morton's idea; it was resisted by the band and poorly received by critics, though it reached number 17 in the US Billboard Top 200. Morton also worked with Iron Butterfly; the group gave an interview to Mix Magazine crediting him with producing the hit track "In-A-Gadda-Da-Vida". Morton told film producer Larry Schweikart in 2009 that the band was too uptight to get the song down, so he faked an equipment malfunction on the soundboard and told them to practice. In fact, he was rolling tape, and he kept giving them the "keep it up" sign, resulting in the long solos and the famous drum solo.

In 1970, Morton produced the psychedelic heavy rock band Haystacks Balboa, a New York City based quintet who toured nationally as support for Rod Stewart, Ten Years After and Jethro Tull. In 1971, Morton produced the Polydor Records album Uncle Chapin, the sole release of the seven-piece jazz rock horn group formerly known as Stonehammer. He also produced all-girl group Isis, and worked with The New York Dolls, producing their second album Too Much Too Soon. Dolls guitarist Johnny Thunders would later cover his composition "Great Big Kiss" on his 1978 solo album So Alone. In 1972, Shadow produced the Boston comedy band Gross National Productions' album P-Flaps and Low Blows.

== Hiatus ==
Morton then disappeared from the music industry for several years, and was treated for alcoholism in 1987 at the Betty Ford Center. He later filed a lawsuit with Polygram Records for the unauthorized use of his music, most famously two Shangri-Las songs that were featured in the 1990 film Goodfellas.

He was inducted into the Long Island Music Hall of Fame on October 15, 2006. In 2009, Morton appeared in the documentary Rockin' the Wall, about music's part in bringing down the Iron Curtain, along with former Vanilla Fudge members Mark Stein and Vinny Martell, as well as David Paich of Toto, Rudy Sarzo of Quiet Riot, Robby Krieger of the Doors, Billy Joel and Joan Jett. In 2013, a compilation album was released of songs written or produced by Morton, titled Sophisticated Boom Boom: The Shadow Morton Story.

== Death ==
Shadow Morton died on February 14, 2013, in Laguna Beach, California, from cancer.
