= Twisted Forever =

Twisted Forever – A Tribute to the Legendary Twisted Sister

Compilation album by Various Artists
- Released: August 14, 2001
- Recorded: 2001
- Genre: Heavy metal, hip hop, alternative rock, thrash metal, hard rock, extreme metal, alternative metal
- Label: Koch
- Producer: Jay Jay French, Phil Carson, and Dave Squillante

Professional ratings
Review scores
Source	Rating
Allmusic	3/5 stars

Twisted Forever – A Tribute to the Legendary Twisted Sister is a tribute album to Twisted Sister, released in 2001. Release of the album was on both CD, and a collector's edition released on double pink vinyl records.

== Track listing / Artist ==
1. I Wanna Rock / Lit
2. Shoot 'Em Down / Motörhead
3. The Kids Are Back / Nashville Pussy
4. The Price / Nine Days
5. Wake Up the Sleeping Giant / Chuck D
6. Destroyer / Anthrax
7. Under the Blade / Overkill
8. The Fire Still Burns / Cradle of Filth
9. Don't Let Me Down / Vision of Disorder
10. Burn in Hell / The Step Kings
11. Ride to Live (Live to Ride) / Fu Manchu
12. We're Not Gonna Take It / Joan Jett
13. You Can't Stop Rock 'N Roll / Sebastian Bach & Friends
14. We're Gonna Make It / HammerFall
15. I Am (I'm Me) / Sevendust
16. Sin City / Twisted Sister

== Charts ==
Album

Year	Chart	Position
2001	The Billboard Top Independent Albums	44
