= The Kids Are Back =

1983 song by Twisted Sister

Single by Twisted Sister

from the album You Can't Stop Rock 'n' Roll
- B-side: "Shoot 'Em Down"
- Released: 20 May 1983
- Genre: Heavy metal
- Length: 3:16
- Label: Atlantic
- Songwriter: Dee Snider
- Producer: Stuart Epps

Twisted Sister singles chronology
"I Am (I'm Me)" (1983)	"The Kids Are Back" (1983)	"You Can't Stop Rock 'n' Roll" (1983)

"The Kids Are Back" is a song by American heavy metal band Twisted Sister, released in May 1983 as the second single from their second studio album, You Can't Stop Rock 'n' Roll. The song was written by frontman Dee Snider and produced by Stuart Epps. "The Kids Are Back" was Twisted Sister's second chart hit, reaching number 32 in the UK Singles Chart and remaining in the top 75 for six weeks.

== Critical reception ==
Upon its release as a single, Howard Johnson of Kerrang! questioned whether You Can't Stop Rock 'n' Roll had another track with "the necessary rock/pop blend" to provide Twisted Sister with another chart hit following "I Am (I'm Me)". He said "The Kids Are Back" was a "logical" choice as a "chantalong rocker which draws on Judas Priestish commercial values for effect". He added, "The days of 'Take On the World' are far behind us now and I doubt that Sister can emulate their initial success, but that doesn't mean, as we all know, that this can't be a damn good ditty. It is!" Sunie of Number One believed it was "undoubtedly another hit" but added, "Seems a shame though, that the cheeky parody of their presentation doesn't come across on their records – shut your eyes and this could be any bunch of tame heavy metal plodders." Simon Hills of Record Mirror remarked, "The 97-year-old men are back more like it. 'We've got a lion in our hearts,' bellows Dee Snider – and a lemming in our brains, no doubt."

In a 2023 retrospective on "the 20 best Twisted Sister songs", Martin Popoff of Goldmine placed "The Kids Are Back" at number 4 and noted the "big power chords" and Snider's "powerful vocal". He wrote, "I swear, this song is as catchy as the two monster songs from Stay Hungry ("We're Not Gonna Take It" and "I Wanna Rock"), but maybe just a little too heavy for radio."

== Track listing ==
7–inch single (UK)

1. "The Kids Are Back" – 3:16
2. "Shoot 'Em Down" (Recorded live at the Marquee, 5th and 6th March 1983) – 3:33

12–inch single (UK)

1. "The Kids Are Back" – 3:16
2. "What You Don't Know Sure Can Hurt You" (Recorded live at the Marquee, 5th and 6th March 1983) – 5:02
3. "Bad Boys of Rock 'n' Roll" (Recorded live at the Marquee, 5th and 6th March 1983) – 3:43
4. "Run for Your Life" (Recorded live at the Marquee, 5th and 6th March 1983) – 3:37

== Personnel ==
Twisted Sister

- Dee Snider – lead vocals, backing vocals
- Jay Jay French – guitars, backing vocals
- Eddie "Fingers" Ojeda – guitars, backing vocals
- Mark "The Animal" Mendoza – bass, backing vocals
- A. J. Pero – drums, backing vocals

Production

- Stuart Epps – production (all tracks), engineering ("The Kids Are Back"), mixing (all tracks)
- Mark "The Animal" Mendoza – studio assistance (all tracks)
- Charles Barreca – live sound engineering (all live tracks)
- Phil Harding – engineering (all live tracks)

Other

- Simon Fowler – photography
- Suzette Guilot-Snider – costume and makeup design

== Charts ==
Chart (1983)	Peak position
Ireland (IRMA)	17
UK Singles (OCC)	32
UK Heavy Metal Singles (MRIB)	1
