= Blood and Bullets (album) =

1992 album by Widowmaker

Studio album by Widowmaker
- Released: July 28, 1992
- Genre: Heavy metal; hard rock
- Length: 51:07
- Label: Esquire Records (US); Music for Nations (Europe); Epic/Sony Music (Japan)
- Producer: Ric Wake

Widowmaker chronology
| Blood and Bullets (1992) | Stand By for Pain (1994) |

Blood and Bullets is the debut studio album by American heavy metal band Widowmaker, released on July 28, 1992.

"Emaheevul", "Gone Bad", "Calling for You", and "Easy Action" (Japanese bonus track) are songs Snider had previously recorded with his short-lived band Desperado for their shelved Elektra Records debut album. The album would surface as the Bloodied, but Unbowed bootleg in the mid-1990s and eventually see an official release, titled Ace, via Angel Air in the UK and Deadline/Cleopatra in the US in 2006, and Del Imaginario Discos in Argentina in 2007.

== Background ==
After Twisted Sister disbanded in 1987, frontman and songwriter Dee Snider formed a new band, Desperado, and recorded an album for Elektra Records. Two weeks before its scheduled release in 1990, the label shelved the album and the band subsequently dissolved. Snider spent another year unable to pursue further musical activities as he remained signed to Elektra, but once free he formed Widowmaker. After a period of struggling to generate record company interest and finance, Ric Wake signed Widowmaker to his independent label Esquire Records and the band recorded their debut album, Blood and Bullets, with Wake as the producer. Much of the material recorded was co-written in 1989–90 by Snider and Bernie Tormé when Desperado were active. Three songs from Desperado's debut album were re-recorded and Snider and Widowmaker guitarist Al Pitrelli co-wrote a couple of new tracks.

Blood and Bullets was released on July 28, 1992, and the band embarked on a US tour to promote it. "Emaheevul" and "The Widowmaker" were released as a promotional singles from the album. A music video was shot for "The Widowmaker" and was directed by Milcho Manchevski and produced by Kate Judge. According to Snider's autobiography Shut Up and Give Me the Mic: A Twisted Memoir, the album achieved over 50,000 CD sales.

Speaking to the Gannett News Service in 1992, Snider said of the album, "It still has the appeal of Twisted Sister, but it has more musical depth. Twisted Sister was very one-dimensional. We had catchy songs and an outrageous image but that was it. Widowmaker has the songs with great hooks but there's musical integrity there, too." The song "Reason to Kill" was inspired by Snider's experiences with his previous labels Atlantic and Elektra.

== Critical reception ==
Professional ratings
Review scores
| Source | Rating |
|---|---|
| AllMusic | 2/5 stars |
| Chicago Tribune | 2.5/4 stars |

Upon its release, Hit Parader praised Blood and Bullets as an album "definitely worth checking out whether or not you were ever a Twisted Sister [fan]". The reviewer added, "Snider has never sounded better and [here he's] aided by the burning lead licks of guitar master Al Pitrelli." Randy Clark of Cash Box felt Widowmaker had the "same sound" and "same attitude" as Twisted Sister. He wrote, "Although the players and their performances on this CD are hot and spirited, there's been little to no change in hard rock/heavy metal since the early '80s, which is what this new album sounds like." Brenda Herrmann of the Chicago Tribune described the album as "serious anthem stuff – not as cheesy as 'We're Not Gonna Take It' but not exactly Nirvana quality either". She added, "Tunes like 'Emaheevul' and 'The Widowmaker' are solid arena-rock, but the ballads, 'The Lonely Ones' and 'Calling for You' are surprisingly good, and the final cut, 'We Are the Dead', is pretty intense."

== Track listing ==
| No. | Title | Writer(s) | Length |
|---|---|---|---|
| 1. | "Emaheevul" | Dee Snider, Bernie Tormé | 3:21 |
| 2. | "The Widowmaker" | Snider, Al Pitrelli | 5:08 |
| 3. | "Evil" | Willie Dixon | 3:06 |
| 4. | "The Lonely Ones" | Spier, Nutter, Snider | 4:59 |
| 5. | "Reason to Kill" | Snider, Pitrelli | 5:34 |
| 6. | "Snot Nose Kid" | Snider, Tormé | 4:07 |
| 7. | "Blood and Bullets (Pissin' Against the Wind)" | Snider, Pitrelli | 3:16 |
| 8. | "Gone Bad" | Snider, Tormé | 3:19 |
| 9. | "Blue for You" | Snider, Tormé, Pitrelli | 6:18 |
| 10. | "You're a Heartbreaker" | Snider, Tormé | 3:21 |
| 11. | "Calling for You" | Snider, Tormé | 4:46 |
| 12. | "We Are the Dead" | Snider, Tormé | 3:48 |
| Total length: | | | 51:07 |

Japan bonus track
| No. | Title | Writer(s) | Length |
|---|---|---|---|
| 13. | "Easy Action" | Snider, Tormé | 3:59 |

== Personnel ==
Widowmaker

- Dee Snider – lead vocals, backing vocals
- Al Pitrelli – guitar, keyboards, backing vocals
- Marc Russell – bass, backing vocals
- Joey Franco – drums

Additional musicians

- Tony Harnell – backing vocals
- Joe Lynn Turner – backing vocals
- Bruno Revell – backing vocals
- Steve West – backing vocals
- Rich Tancredi – keyboards

Production

- Ric Wake – production
- Bob Cadway – engineering
- Rick Kerr – mixing
- Tony Dawsey – mastering
