= Never Let the Bastards Wear You Down =

Studio album by Dee Snider
- Released: August 22, 2000
- Genre: Heavy metal
- Length: 40:43
- Label: Koch
- Producer: Denny McNerney

Dee Snider chronology
Never Let the Bastards Wear You Down (2000)	Dee Does Broadway (2012)

Never Let the Bastards Wear You Down is a studio album by American singer Dee Snider released on August 22, 2000. The album title is a reference to the mock-Latin aphorism Illegitimi non-carborundum.

The album contains a number of songs Snider wrote for Twisted Sister, Desperado and Widowmaker, but never recorded. Speaking of Never Let the Bastards Wear You Down, Snider told the Hartford Courant in 2000: "I was approached by Koch Records. They asked me if there was something I wanted to do. And there were a number of songs I've written for various projects that I never had a chance to record." At the time of the album's release, Snider stated it would be his final album in favour of focusing on his film and radio careers. He told the Philadelphia Daily News: "I am definitely of the mind to put my music career behind me. I see this record as the last chapter in my recording career."

== Critical reception ==
Professional ratings
Review scores
Source	Rating
AllMusic	4/5 stars

Upon its release, Steve Huey of AllMusic described the album as "simple, anthemic '80s pop-metal" and added: "Of course, that was always what Snider did best, and that's why Never Let the Bastards Wear You Down will be a fun listen for anyone who still enjoys vintage Twisted Sister records." David Gerard of The Boston Globe wrote: "On Snider's solo outing, he goes beyond the sometimes poppish overtones of his former band, and instead delves into the more aggressive side of metal. As Snider has claimed this disc to be his last, I can think of no better requiem for the godfather of headbanger rock."

== Track listing ==
No.	Title	Writer(s)	Length
1.	"Hardcore (Lemmy's Song)"	Dee Snider	4:06
2.	"Call My Name"	Snider	2:59
3.	"Our Voice Will Be Heard"	Snider	2:59
4.	"Isn't It Time"	Snider/Bernie Tormé	4:33
5.	"Cry You a Rainbow"	Snider/Tormé	5:02
6.	"The Wanderer"	Ernie Maresca	4:56
7.	"Uh-Huh-Huh"	Snider/Tormé	3:53
8.	"Desperado"	Snider/Tormé	3:55
9.	"Sometimes You Win (Sometimes You Lose)"	Snider/Tormé	3:57
10.	"Ride Through the Storm (Suzette's Song Part 2)"	Snider/Tormé	4:23
Total length:			40:43

== Personnel ==
- Dee Snider – lead vocals, backing vocals
- Tony Palmucci, Dan McCafferty – guitars
- Derek Tailer – bass
- A.J. Pero – Drums

Production

- Denny McNerney – producer, engineer, mastering
- Justin Picotte – assistant engineer

Other

- J Cooch Lucchese – art design, photography
- Pete Scifo, Cris Lepurage, Larry Morano – photography
