= Bloodied, but Unbowed (disambiguation) =

Bloodied, but Unbowed is an album by Desperado.

Bloodied, but Unbowed may also refer to:

- Bloodied But Unbowed (HR report on Bahrain)
- Bloodied but Unbowed, a 2010 Canadian documentary film
- "Bloody, but unbowed", a phrase from William Ernest Henley's poem "Invictus"
