= Human Price of Freedom and Justice =

The Human Price of Freedom and Justice is a joint report by a group of Bahrain's independent human rights NGOs presenting the main key findings from the ongoing effort to document violations occurring in the state of Bahrain during the Bahraini uprising (2011–present). The 87-page report gives background to the situation, then identifies and documents all the types of violations that took place, with the aim of putting out recommendations to the Bahraini government, as well as the EU, US, UN OHCHR and the ICC. The report was published on 22 November 2011, one day before the Bahrain Independent Commission of Inquiry (BICI) report was published. The report has found that the violations have been widespread and systematic. Finally, the report urged the U.N. to "send an urgent mission to Bahrain to investigate the deaths of at least 4 protesters killed since BICI closed its doors."

== Background ==
As part of a string of protests that occurred across the Arab World following the self-immolation and eventual death of Mohammed Bouazizi in Tunisia, the mostly Shia population of Bahrain took to the streets demanding greater freedoms. The move was seen as potentially destabilising to the Sunni-led regime of Bahrain, following which a brutal government crackdown led to widespread suppression of the Shia people across many sectors, especially the medical field after the invasion of Bahrain by Gulf Cooperation Council soldiers led by Saudi Arabia. The Bahraini government also hired Pakistani mercenaries to maintain security against the protesters, however, lesser intermittent protests continued.

=== Statistics ===
- 45 killings.
- 1500 cases of arbitrary arrest.
- 1866 cases of torture and ill-treatment.
- 500 prisoners of conscience.
- Destruction of 40+ places of worship.
- 2710 summary sackings.
- 500 in exile.
- 3 men on death row.
- 477 Students expelled.

=== Areas of grave violations of international human rights law ===
- Excessive use of force against protesters.
- Torture and other forms of cruel and degrading treatment.
- Extrajudicial killings.
- Arbitrary detentions, arrests and enforced disappearances.
- Freedom of association and assembly.
- Freedom of opinion and expression.
- Religious discrimination.
- Right to a fair trial.
- Confiscation and destruction of property.
- Attacks on unionists, labourers and students
- Denial of medical access and medical neutrality.
- Use of mercenaries.

== Recommendations ==
The Bahraini human rights group recommend various changes to the Bahraini government aimed at ending human rights violations and providing reparation to victims as well as to the EU and US to increase awareness of ongoing issues and pressure the Bahraini government to comply.

== Reception ==
International Freedom of Expression Exchange said that "while the work of this joint report is representative of an almost year-long research study, much more needs to be done, largely because the conflict continues to rage and violations of international human rights law are reported every day.", they said.

== See also ==
- Human rights reports on Bahraini uprising (2011–present)
- Bahrain Independent Commission of Inquiry
- Human rights in Bahrain
- Torture in Bahrain
