= The Price (song) =

1984 song by Twisted Sister

Single by Twisted Sister

from the album Stay Hungry
- B-side: "S.M.F."
- Released: December 1984
- Genre: Glam metal, hard rock
- Length: 3:48
- Label: Atlantic
- Songwriter: Dee Snider
- Producer: Tom Werman

Twisted Sister singles chronology
"I Wanna Rock" (1984)	"The Price" (1984)	"Leader of the Pack" (1985)

Music video
- "The Price" on YouTube

"The Price" is a song by American heavy metal band Twisted Sister, released in 1984 as the third and final single from their third studio album, Stay Hungry. A power ballad, it was written by Dee Snider and produced by Tom Werman. "The Price" failed to reach the US Billboard Hot 100, stalling at number 8 on the Bubbling Under the Hot 100 chart in January 1985.

== Writing ==
Snider wrote "The Price" while Twisted Sister were recording their second studio album, You Can't Stop Rock 'n' Roll, in England during early 1983. The song was inspired by Snider's feelings at the time, having been in England for four months without being able to see his wife and son, who were back in the US. The song came to Snider after he answered the phone in the studio and had a brief conversation with guitarist Jay Jay French's sister-in-law, Ricky. He told her that he was feeling homesick and was unhappy about being away from his family and she replied, "Well, Dee, I guess that's the price you have to pay." After passing the phone over to French, Snider immediately went away and began writing the song. Snider later recalled, "Her words hit me hard. I handed the phone to Jay Jay, grabbed my handheld tape recorder and went into the bathroom (a place I've always gone for privacy) and wrote 'The Price.' Just top-to-bottom, melodically – not every word. The whole song just poured out of me."

== Release ==
"The Price" was released in December 1984 as the third single from Stay Hungry. The band expected it to give them their third consecutive US hit, but it failed to reach the Billboard Hot 100 and stalled at number 8 on the Bubbling Under the Hot 100 chart in January 1985. It achieved success on rock radio and reached number 19 on the Billboard Top Rock Tracks chart in February 1985. In his 2012 autobiography, Shut Up and Give Me the Mic: A Twisted Memoir, Snider said, "The song tested well at radio and the video was a fairly welcome departure from our usual fare at MTV, but 'The Price' didn't break through the way we all hoped it would. We expected it to push the album to the next sales level (triple platinum)." In his autobiography, Snider attributed the single's commercial failure to the lack of a radio mix. For the band's two previous singles, "We're Not Gonna Take It" and "I Wanna Rock", producer Tom Werman created radio mixes. "The Price" never received one as Atlantic Records, wanting to release the single as quickly as possible, did not inform Werman of its upcoming release.

In the UK, "The Price" was released as a single on 18 March 1985.

== Music video ==
The song's music video was directed by Marty Callner, who also directed Twisted Sister's two previous videos for "We're Not Gonna Take It" and "I Wanna Rock". As "The Price" was a "heartfelt ballad", Callner and Snider decided not to continue the slapstick comedy theme of the previous videos and they also agreed that there should be less emphasis on the band's makeup and costumes. The resulting video was a performance-based one, with footage alternating between the band performing in casual clothes and no makeup at a soundcheck and in full costume and makeup during a concert. It was shot in early 1985 at the Rochester Community War Memorial in Rochester, New York, when the band had a couple of days off during their tour with Iron Maiden. The video achieved medium rotation on MTV.

== Critical reception ==
Upon its release in the UK, Kerrang! wrote, "It's the price we have got to pay for this single that worries me, and being the third from the same LP doesn't make it much of an appetiser... guess I'll have to stay hungry!" In a 2023 retrospective on "the 20 best Twisted Sister songs", Martin Popoff of Goldmine placed "The Price" at number 12 and described it as "the most sincere ballad the band ever did". He noted the "irresistible chords at the chorus, supported by Dee's leonine selling of the lyric" and felt its inclusion on Stay Hungry gave the album "some dimension and thoughtfulness".

== Track listing ==
7–inch single (US, Canada, UK and Australasia)

1. "The Price" – 3:48
2. "S.M.F." – 3:00

== Personnel ==
Twisted Sister

- Dee Snider – lead vocals, backing vocals
- Jay Jay French – guitars, backing vocals
- Eddie "Fingers" Ojeda – guitars, backing vocals
- Mark "The Animal" Mendoza – bass, backing vocals
- A. J. Pero – drums, backing vocals

Production

- Tom Werman – production

== Charts ==
Chart (1985)	Peak position
US Billboard Bubbling Under the Hot 100	8
US Billboard Top Rock Tracks	19
US Radio & Records AOR/Tracks	24
