= Under the Blade =

Studio album by Twisted Sister
- Released: September 1982
- Recorded: July 1982
- Studio: The Barn at Kitchenham Farm, Ashburnham with the RAK Mobile, I.C.C. Studios, Eastbourne, Maison Rouge, London, England
- Genre: Heavy metal
- Length: 40:01
- Label: Secret
- Producer: Pete Way, Mark Mendoza, Dee Snider

Twisted Sister chronology
Ruff Cutts (1982)	Under the Blade (1982)	You Can't Stop Rock 'n' Roll (1983)

Alternate cover
- Cover art for the 1985 remix

Under the Blade is the debut studio album by American heavy metal band Twisted Sister, released in September 1982 by Secret Records. The group had a following in the New York metropolitan area since the 1970s, but was turned down by most American labels. They relocated to the UK, in the midst of a heavy metal resurgence, and produced the album with UFO/Waysted bassist Pete Way. Featuring a raw, unpolished sound, many of the songs are rerecordings of demos the band had been playing since their club days.

The band caught the attention of Martin Hooker, the president of Secret Records, a small British label that was mainly a punk outlet, who signed them and released the EP Ruff Cutts (1982) in anticipation of their debut studio album. Under the Blade was released only in Europe, and was a minor success that peaked at No. 70 on the UK Albums Chart. No singles were released from the album, and Secret went bankrupt not long after. The album was remixed and rereleased, in the U.S. for the first time, by Atlantic Records on June 13, 1985.

While not as successful as the band's following albums, Under the Blade was well received by contemporary critics. The album has become a fan favorite, as many are partial to its aggressive and hard-hitting sound. For the same reason, the remixed re-release by Atlantic Records has been criticized for sounding too "poppy" and lacking the charm of the original. Regardless, the album is seen as one of the best in Twisted Sister's discography and metal in general.

== Background ==
By the late 1970s, Twisted Sister were one of the most popular bar bands in the New York metropolitan area, but were still unsigned. The band started its own record label, Twisted Sister Records, and released two singles, "I'll Never Grow Up, Now!" (1979) and "Bad Boys (Of Rock N' Roll)" (1980). They eventually made it over to the UK and caught the attention of Martin Hooker, the president of indie label Secret Records, a small British label that was mainly a punk outlet.

On the suggestion of two reporters from Sounds and Kerrang! magazines, Twisted Sister, one of the most popular bar bands in the New York metropolitan area left the New York metropolitan area to find a label in the UK, that was in the midst of a heavy metal resurgence (dubbed the New Wave of British Heavy Metal). There, in April 1982, they were finally signed by Secret Records. The band also took $22,000 to the UK to appear on the show The Tube.

In July 1982, while the band recorded its debut album, the EP Ruff Cutts was released by Secret Records. The head of the label, Martin Hooker, had suggested this to capitalize on the band's buzz in the British music press, as well as cope "with demand for Twisted Sister product" and provide "a taster of what's to come" on their debut album. The EP consists of four demo tracks, all of which appeared on a tape the band gave to Secret Records prior to signing with them, and were re-recorded for Under the Blade, except "Leader of the Pack"

== Recording ==
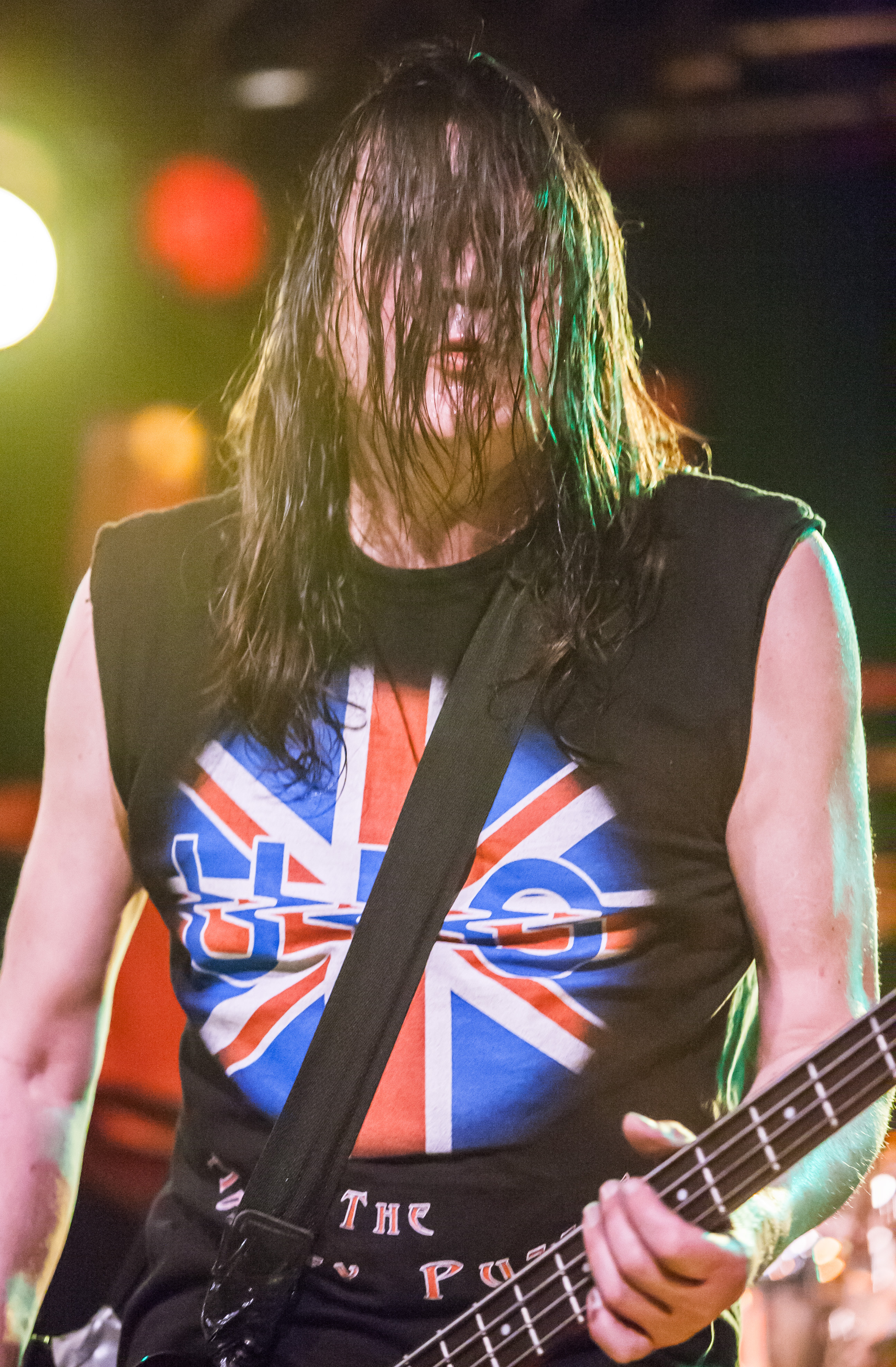
UFO/Waysted bassist Pete Way produced the album

Secret Records secured The Barn At Kitchenham Farm in London, England, with a mobile unit owned by British producer Mickie Most as the band's recording location. These sessions were overseen by UFO/Waysted bassist Pete Way, who produced the album with frontman Dee Snider and bassist Mark Mendoza. This led to primitive conditions while recording, with Mendoza recalling: "We used bales of hay – yes, bales of hay – around A.J.’s drums and Eddie and Jay Jay’s amplifiers." Twisted Sister not only, tediously, found the ideal placements for their kit, but repeatedly had to break it down, due to other activities at the barn, such as dances.

During interviews for a 2011 reissue of this album, guitarist Jay Jay French revealed the band ended up loving the recording conditions, as did "Fast" Eddie Clarke, a former guitarist of Motorhead who made a guest appearance on the song "Tear It Loose." This was long before becoming Way's future bandmate in Fastway. He insisted on recording his guitar parts in the "haystack column" of Marshall amps. French had argued they should record their parts outside the barn with headphones, due to the volume that 180 decibels, but Clarke felt otherwise.

In between his parts, Snider had free time while his bandmates were recording their parts, giving him time to come up with future songs. "I sat alone in the band van or in a spare room or in my hotel room, whatever was available to me developing those song ideas," Snider wrote in his 2012 memoir. Another song the band recorded was "You Can't Stop Rock 'n' Roll", the original title track, but Martin Hooker stopped this, as Snider revealed in his book: "For some reason, at that time, songs and album titles with the words 'rock 'n' roll' in them were out of vogue in the U.K." "Under the Blade" was then chosen as the title track, but the song was repurposed on the band's major label debut of the same name.

== Overview ==
The album features an aggressive and hard-hitting sound, which was eventually ignored on a remixed re-release by Atlantic Records on June 13, 1985. The re-release also added a remixed version of the song "I'll Never Grow Up, Now!", the band's long-forgotten 1979 single.

The Atlantic Records release was both an attempt to cash in on the commercial success of Stay Hungry and, by then (and for years to come), the only official way to get the album as Secret Records was no more. However, bootlegs with the original mix were still in circulation. On May 31, 2016, Eagle Records re-released Under the Blade in a digital remastered form with the original mix finally restored, which it would be re-released under Rhino Entertainment through streaming services. Under the Blade has sold over two million copies worldwide.

The track "Bad Boys of Rock 'N Roll" is a new recording of a track that appeared earlier on the 1981 compilation "Homegrown Album"

== Critical reception ==
Professional ratings
Review scores
Source	Rating
AllMusic	4/5 stars
Collector's Guide to Heavy Metal	9/10
PopMatters	9/10 stars

In a long article about '80s metal, Tim Holmes of Rolling Stone wrote a contemporary review about Twisted Sister describing them as "the clown heir apparent to the gaping vacancy left by Alice Cooper" and a band who "write(s) songs that have a giddy, street-smart narrative approach and a gritty coherence that metal usually lacks." He also wrote that Under the Blade "is not technically a new album but rather a remix for modern ears" of older music.

Modern reviews are very positive. Greg Prato of AllMusic reminds how the band moved to the UK, which was having a "heavy metal resurgence (dubbed the New Wave of British Heavy Metal)", to record with UFO bassist Pete Way "many of the band's best compositions from their club days" and finds Under the Blade "one of Twisted Sister's hardest rocking albums... highly recommended to lovers of early-'80s British heavy metal." Also Exclaim! reviewer Ian Gormely considers the album "a must for anyone with an interest in the history of American hard rock". Despite "the raw production... and lack of an obvious hit... it laid the groundwork for their future success", thanks also to Twisted Sister's "tongue-in-cheek presentation that latter-day hair metal bands clearly lacked." Adrian Begrand of PopMatters reviews the album as a "near-classic" and "the most ferocious of the band's career." He writes that the musicians may have "bar band roots", but on the album "the fun side of Twisted Sister is set aside in favor of something a lot darker", which brought to "a hell of a debut that not only connected with British heavy metal fans, but would eventually lead to a contract with Atlantic Records, paving the way to stardom a couple years later." Canadian journalist Martin Popoff considers Under the Blade "dead serious despite the garish imagery, a good four-fifths of it rocking with hellacious clout, attitude and clever economy" and remarks how the influence of Judas Priest is evident in Dee Snider's compositions.

The album was ranked #24 on Metal Rules list of "The Top 50 Glam Metal Albums".

In 1985 the member of the PMRC committee Tipper Gore (wife of Senator Al Gore), believed that the song "Under the Blade" referred to "sadomasochism, bondage, and rape", promoting violence, while Dee Snider testified at the Congress panel hearings that it was "about surgery, and the fear that it instills in people", concluding that "the only sadomasochism, bondage, and rape in this song is in the mind of Ms. Gore."

In 2005, Under the Blade was ranked number 387 in Rock Hard magazine's book The 500 Greatest Rock & Metal Albums of All Time.

== Track listing ==
All tracks are written by Dee Snider.

Side one
No.	Title	Length
1.	"What You Don't Know (Sure Can Hurt You)"	4:45
2.	"Bad Boys (of Rock 'n' Roll)"	3:20
3.	"Run for Your Life"	3:28
4.	"Sin After Sin"	3:23
5.	"Shoot 'Em Down"	3:53

Side two
No.	Title	Length
6.	"Destroyer"	4:16
7.	"Under the Blade"	4:40
8.	"Tear It Loose"	3:08
9.	"I'll Never Grow Up, Now" (1985 Atlantic re-issue only)	4:27
10.	"Day of the Rocker"	5:03

== Special edition ==
The special edition, released on CD, contains the original album, the complete and remastered Ruff Cutts EP, and an edited live version of "Shoot 'Em Down" from a UK sampler called "Reading Rock Volume One". Also, the appearance of Twisted Sister at the 1982 Reading Festival is on a bonus DVD, together with interviews from the band members.

1. "What You Don't Know (Sure Can Hurt You)" – 4:46
2. "Bad Boys (Of Rock 'n' Roll)" – 3:21
3. "Run for Your Life" – 3:28
4. "Sin After Sin" – 3:22
5. "Shoot 'Em Down" – 3:54
6. "Destroyer" – 4:09
7. "Under the Blade" – 4:38
8. "Tear It Loose" – 3:09
9. "Day of the Rocker" – 5:02††
10. "What You Don't Know (Sure Can Hurt You)" – 5:32†
11. "Shoot 'Em Down" – 3:56†
12. "Under the Blade" – 4:41†
13. "Leader of the Pack" – 4:01†
14. "Shoot 'Em Down (live)" – 3:37

†from the 1982 Ruff Cutts EP

††"Day of the Rocker" contains few seconds extra after fade out (4:55 to 5:02) with the final phrase "Rock, Rock, Rock!"

== Personnel ==
Band members

- Dee Snider – lead and backing vocals, assistant producer
- Jay Jay French – guitar, backing vocals
- Eddie "Fingers" Ojeda – guitar, backing vocals
- Mark "The Animal" Mendoza – bass guitar, backing vocals, assistant producer, remix producer, engineer
- A. J. Pero – drums, backing vocals
- Joey Brighton – drums (tracks 10, 11 on Special edition)
- Tony Petri – drums (side b track 4 on re-issue 1985 edition; tracks 12, 13 on Special edition)

Guest musician

- "Fast" Eddie Clarke – second guitar solo on "Tear It Loose"

Production

- Pete Way – producer, executive producer
- Will Gosling, Craig Thomson, Dave Boscombe – engineers, mixing
- Mark Mendoza, Danny McNerney – 1985 remix engineers
- Fin Costello – cover concept and photography

== Charts ==
Chart (1982)	Peak position
UK Albums (Official Charts)	70

Chart (1985)	Peak position
New Zealand Albums (RMNZ)	40
US Billboard 200	125
