= Bloodied, but Unbowed =

Studio album by Desperado
- Released: 1996
- Recorded: 1988
- Genre: Hard rock, heavy metal
- Length: 62:32
- Label: Destroyer

Bloodied, but Unbowed is the debut album by the American hard rock band Desperado. It was released by Destroyer Records in 1996.

Re-titled under its original title, Ace, it was re-issued in 2006 by Angel Air Records in the UK (including extensive sleeve notes by Record Collector magazine's Joe Geesin, featuring interviews by Bernie Tormé and Dee Snider) and Deadline Records in the U.S. with the songs "Easy Action" and "Heart of Saturday Night" cut from the track listing. Argentina's Del Imaginario Discos also released the album in 2007.

"Gone Bad", "Calling for You", "Emaheeval", and "Easy Action" were re-recorded by Snider's next band, Widowmaker, for their 1992 debut album, Blood and Bullets.

== Track listing ==
All songs written by Dee Snider and Bernie Tormé, except "Heart of Saturday Night" by Tom Waits.

1. "Hang 'Em High" - 4:51
2. "Gone Bad" - 3:44
3. "The Maverick" - 5:06
4. "The Heart Is a Lonely Hunter" - 7:11
5. "Calling for You" - 4:54
6. "See You at Sunrise" - 5:53
7. "There's No Angels Here" - 4:54
8. "Made for Trouble" - 3:45
9. "Ride Thru the Storm" - 4:30
10. "Son of a Gun" - 5:34
11. "Emaheevol" - 4:25
12. "Easy Action" - 3:52
13. "Heart of Saturday Night" - 3:53

== Personnel ==
- Dee Snider – vocals
- Bernie Tormé – guitars
- Marc Russell – bass
- Clive Burr – drums
