= Bahrain Independent Commission of Inquiry =

Organization tasked with investigating the 2011 Bahraini uprising

The Bahrain Independent Commission of Inquiry (BICI), also known locally in Bahrain as the Bassiouni Commission, was established by the King of Bahrain on 29 June 2011 tasked with looking into the incidents that occurred during the period of unrest in Bahrain in February and March 2011 and the consequences of these events.

The commission released a 500-page report on 23 November 2011, which took 9,000 testimonies, offered an extensive chronology of events, documented 46 deaths, 559 allegations of torture, and more than 4,000 cases of employees dismissed for participating in protests. The report criticized the security forces for many instances when "force and firearms were used in an excessive manner that was, on many occasions, unnecessary, disproportionate, and indiscriminate;" and found that certain abuses, such as destruction of property, "could not have happened without the knowledge of higher echelons of the command structure." The report also stated that the violence in Bahrain "was the result of an escalating process in which both the Government and the opposition have their share of responsibility in allowing events to unfold as they did".

The report confirmed the Bahraini government's use of systematic torture and other forms of physical and psychological abuse on detainees, as well as other human rights violations. It also rejected the government's claims that the protests were instigated by Iran. It has been criticised for not disclosing the names of individual perpetrators of abuses and extending accountability only to those who actively carried out human rights violations.

== Establishment ==
The commission was established by King Hamad bin Isa Al Khalifa of Bahrain by Royal Decree 28 of 2011. The King said that "the Commission had been set up after broad consultation, including with the United Nations Commission on Human Rights". The commission is notable for its broad Terms of Reference and the expertise of its internationally renowned commissioners.

== Members ==
The BICI was described by human rights group Amnesty International as "an impressive line-up of independent international experts". The BICI was chaired by Professor M. Cherif Bassiouni who had led United Nations investigations into alleged war crimes in Bosnia and Libya. The four other members were Sir Nigel S. Rodley, a former United Nations Special Rapporteur on Torture and currently a member of the United Nations Human Rights Committee; Justice Philippe Kirsch, a former judge at the International Criminal Court (ICC); Dr Mahnoush Arsanjani, a former UN legal advisor; and Dr Badria al 'Awadhi, an expert on international and Sharia law at the Freedom House Foundation in Washington, D.C.

On 7 September 2011 the BICI invited Dr Sondra Crosby, an expert on hunger strikes, to join its team in order to monitor those prisoners on hunger strike in the Kingdom. Her appointment was instigated on "humanitarian grounds due to the deep concern of the BICI with the plight of the prisoners and detainees who are on hunger strike".

== Terms of reference ==
According to Article 4 of Royal Decree 28, the commission's mandate is to "engage in fact finding". and it will have access to all officials and official documents that it considers relevant as well as access, in secret if necessary, to alleged victims and witnesses of alleged violations of the law perpetrated by both the protesters and the government.

The commission's total independence is outlined in Article 3 and Article 6 of Royal Decree 28. It will determine its work on its own and without any interference by the government, which is prohibited from interfering in the commission's work.

According to Article 9 of Royal Decree 28, the commission's final report should include the following:

1. A complete narrative of the events that occurred during February and March, 2011.
2. The context for these events.
3. Whether during these events there have been violations of international human rights norms by any participants during the events or in the interaction between the public and the government.
4. A description of any acts of violence that have occurred including the nature of the acts, how they occurred, who the actors were and what consequences derived therefrom, in particular at the Salmaniya Hospital and the GCC Roundabout.
5. Instances of alleged police brutality and alleged violence by protesters and/or demonstrators against police and others, including foreigners.
6. The circumstances and appropriateness of arrests and detentions.
7. Examination of allegations of disappearances or torture.
8. Ascertain whether there was any media harassment, whether audiovisual or written, against participants in demonstrations and public protests.
9. Examination of alleged unlawful demolition of religious structures.
10. Ascertain any involvement of foreign forces and foreign actors in the events.

The commission is allowed to make any recommendations is deems appropriate in its final report including: recommendations for further official investigation or prosecution of any person, including public officials or employees; recommendations for reconsideration of administrative and legal actions; and recommendations concerning the institutionalisation of mechanisms designed to prevent the recurrence of similar events, and how to address them.

== International reaction to the establishment of the commission ==
US President Barack Obama praised the establishment of the commission on 2 July 2011 and said that, "by providing an independent assessment of what happened and identifying those responsible, the Royal Commission will play an essential role in advancing reconciliation, justice, and peace in Bahrain." White House Deputy Spokesman Mark Toner welcomed the announcement of the establishment of the commission on 1 July 2011, adding that it was a "step in the right direction". Toner was pleased that the government of Bahrain was "taking significant and positive steps and hope that these efforts ... will help restore confidence and trust as Bahrain moves towards the beginning of the National Dialogue".

In the United Kingdom, Minister for the Middle East and North Africa Alistair Burt said: "We welcome the establishment today by His Majesty the King of an independent commission, composed of international figures, to look into the events of recent months and into allegations of abuses of human rights. It is our hope that this promising and significant step will lead to concrete progress in addressing the recent serious concerns about the human rights situation in Bahrain, reiterated by the Foreign Secretary yesterday. We also hope these developments will be complemented by all sides participating in a successful and peaceful commencement of the National Dialogue."

The Arab League General Secretariat hailed the establishment of the commission as a step that will "meet Bahrain people's aspirations and bolster constitutional establishments beyond any foreign interference to subvert the Kingdom's independence, sovereignty and stability and undermine its Arab identity."

EU High Representative of the Union for Foreign Affairs and Security Policy Catherine Ashton said on 1 July 2011 that the "establishment of an independent commission, composed of international members, to investigate the origins, causes and facts behind the many allegations of human rights violations in recent months in Bahrain. This is a step in the right direction, which we hope will shed full light on those events. I expect the independent commission to be in a position to carry out its work freely and thoroughly and I look forward to its final report due to be released at the end of October 2011."

Amnesty International labelled the commission as "a significant step forward but must lead to justice for the victims". Malcolm Smart, Director of Amnesty International's Middle East and North Africa programme, said, "moreover, the terms of the King's decree make clear that they will have the authority to carry out a full investigation" and added that "appointment of this international commission appears to represent nothing less than a sea change in Bahrain".

== Implementation of the BICI's recommendations ==
The BICI report gave a series of recommendations to the government of steps that it believed would improve accountability and bring government practice in line with international standards. The government gave itself a target of implementing these recommendations by the end of February 2012. The implementation progress of these recommendations is recorded on the govactions website. As far as the general recommendations are concerned, the government claims that it has implemented the following recommendations:

- 1715: the implementation program. A royal order on 26 November 2011 established the implementation commission, which was independent and consisted of 19 members.
- 1716: creating a government accountability mechanism. A team comprising Sir Daniel Bethlehem QC, Sir Jeffrey Jowell QC, Professor Adnan Amkhan, Professor Sarah Cleveland and David Perry QC provided their advice on the establishment of a Special Investigations Unit that is tasked with determining accountability.
- 1717: to create an ombudsman at the Ministry of Interior and a police Code of Conduct. A decree establishing both the Ombudsman and the Internal Affairs department was issued on 28 February 2012.
- 1718: reorganisation of the National Security Agency and National Safety situations. A decree on 28 November 2011 made the NSA an intelligence gathering agency with no law enforcement and arrest powers (though this was reversed by another decree in 2017). In December 2011 the cabinet approved legislative amendments that ensure that arrests of persons will be in accordance with the Code of Criminal Procedure even in the state of national safety.
- 1719: to undertake investigations into torture claims. On 8 January 2012, the Cabinet approved legislative amendments "that give the Attorney General the exclusive jurisdiction to investigate claims of torture and other forms of inhuman treatment"; and "protecting persons from any retribution for raising a claim of torture or other forms of cruel or inhuman treatment". Technical assistance is provided by the UNODC, amongst others.
- 1720: to review all convictions and sentences rendered by the National Security Courts. All live cases are "being reviewed in the ordinary courts to ensure fair trial rights have been complied with in cases before the National Safety Courts (NSC)".

== BICI and the Bahrain Centre for Human Rights ==
The Bahrain Centre for Human Rights has criticised BICI's panels members and its activities. In an open letter to M. Cherif Bassiouni dated 9 August, Nabeel Rajab, president of the Bahraini non-profit organisation Bahrain Centre for Human Rights, expressed "deep disappointment and regret" at comments made by Bassiouni in an interview with Reuters on 8 August 2011. In the interview, Bassiouni praised the cooperation that the BICI has received from the Interior Ministry and states that there was never a policy of excessive use of force. Rajab alleges that Bassiouni is "willing to espouse the view of the political establishment whilst paying lip-service to the concept of a fair and independent enquiry." Rajab goes on to "seriously question the legitimacy of this commission and its ultimate findings".

Bassiouni, in an open letter on 9 August, responded to Rajab's allegations in full, and described the BCHR's allegations that the BICI espouses the government's views as an "insult to the Commissioners and staff" of the BICI. He denied Rajab's allegation that the BICI had already reached any conclusions. Bassiouni continues by criticising the conclusions that Rajab drew from his Reuters interview, saying they are "premature", and admits to finding it "disheartening that you (Rajab) deemed it necessary to personally attack me". In a further statement published on the BICI website on 15 August the BICI reiterated that it had not come to any conclusions in its investigations and, as a result of "misleading headlines" and the misrepresentation of Bassiouni's comments "by certain media outlets and activists", will no longer be giving interviews to the media. The statement ends by saying that the BICI "will not allow itself to be used as a political tool for any group".

The head of the Bahrain Human Rights Watch Society Faisal Fulad, who was implicated in the Bandargate scandal, believe that the continued attempts to discredit the BICI are part of a concerted campaign by the opposition to delegitimise the commission's findings.

Participating in HARDtalk, Rajab said the commission was not independent and that the king has failed to deliver its recommendations which he accepted.

== Storming of the BICI offices ==
On 15 August 2011 a group of protestors stormed the BICI offices, having been angered by the inaccurate reporting of the supposed 'conclusions' reached by Bassiouni. The move was encouraged by activists online and the activist group "Return to Work is My Right", who defended their decision to congregate at the BICI offices. As a result of the intrusion, the BICI offices closed.

According to a statement released by the BICI on 15 August, individuals "yelled insults, posted threatening messages on the office walls, sent threats via text and email, and even physically shoved and spat at a member of staff". Individuals also continued to photograph and video record people in the office, despite advice from staff that such actions undermine the confidentiality and safety of the many witnesses and victims coming forward.

== Activities ==
According to a statement issued on 10 August 2011, the BICI has:

- Met with over 200 persons in prisons and detention facilities and injured persons in hospitals; 50 senior government officials, including several members of cabinet; 18 opposition parties and civil society organizations; 90 students who have been suspended from their studies; and 105 persons who have been arbitrarily dismissed from their work positions.
- Received 300 complaints from dismissed employees.
- Recorded 140 allegations of physical abuse and torture in prisons and police stations.
- Secured the release of 151 persons from prisons or detention facilities. This number includes 137 persons who were charged with misdemeanors and were pending trial. These cases were transferred from the military court system to the civilian court system by a Royal Order at the request of the BICI chairman.
- Instigated an investigation by the Ministry of Interior into 2 police officers and 10 police personnel charged with physical abuse and torture.
- Received statements from 348 witnesses and victims of alleged arbitrary arrest and detention, physical abuse, and torture.
- Received over 900 emails, many of them containing information about events, and alleged victimization, either by the sender or claimed to be known by the sender.

The report was released 23 November 2011.

== BICI report submission delay ==
The BICI announced on 20 October that King Hamad had allowed the submission of the report to be delayed from 30 October to 23 November. The delay was requested by Bassiouni in an audience with the king on 18 October. He said that the BICI needed more time to investigate the large numbers of reports that had been submitted. While expressing its appreciation for the cooperation of government agencies, Bassiouni also noted that the BICI still needed some information from certain government ministries.

Bassiouni also stated that all physical documents, including statements and complaints from Bahrainis and foreigners, would be destroyed when the report is submitted. An electronic copy of the documents will be kept at the Permanent Court of Arbitration in The Hague for ten years.

== Conclusions and observations of the report ==
The following are the conclusions and observations of the report:

- "Both the Government and the opposition have their share of responsibility in allowing events to unfold as they did."
- "The forceful confrontation of demonstrators involving the use of lethal force and resort to a heavy deployment of Public Security Forces led to the death of civilians."
- "If HRH the Crown Prince's initiative and proposals...[put forward in March 2011], had been accepted, it could have paved the way for significant constitutional, political and socioeconomic reforms and precluded the ensuing negative consequences."
- "Many detainees were subjected to torture and other forms of physical and psychological abuse while in custody at Al Qurain Prison (BDF). This systematic practice ceased after 10 June, but detainees at other facilities continued to report incidents of mistreatment after that time."
- "the lack of accountability of officials within the security system in Bahrain has led to a culture of impunity, whereby security officials have few incentives to avoid mistreatment of prisoners or to take action to prevent mistreatment by other officials."
- "35 people were killed during the unrest, including 5 members of the security forces."
- "Sunnis were targeted by some demonstrators, either because they professed loyalty to the regime or on the basis of their sect. Sunnis were subjected to verbal abuse, physical attacks and attacks on their property as well as harassment... The Sunni community was seen as a target due to the perception that all Sunnis are agents or supporters of the GoB and the ruling family."
- "Some expatriates, particularly South Asian workers, were the targets of attacks during the events of February/March 2011. Pakistanis, in particular, were targeted owing to the membership or suspected membership of some Pakistanis in the BDF and police force... The Commission notes that four expatriates were killed and many were injured by mobs as a result of these attacks."
- "The Commission has not found any evidence of human rights violations committed by the GCC-JSF units deployed in Bahrain starting on 14 March 2011."
- "The evidence presented to the Commission by the GoB on the involvement by the Islamic Republic of Iran in the internal affairs of Bahrain does not establish a discernable link between specific incidents that occurred in Bahrain during February and March 2011 and the Islamic Republic of Iran."

== International reaction to the publication of the report ==
The report was welcomed by many international governments. Hillary Clinton, US Secretary of State, stated that she "commend[ed] King Hamad bin Isa al-Khalifa's initiative in commissioning it." She reiterated that it "is essential for Bahrainis themselves to resolve the issues identified in the report and move forward in a way that promotes reform, reconciliation, and stability". The White House stated that the report "provides a thorough and independent assessment of events in Bahrain since protests first erupted in February", and said that "it is now incumbent upon the Government of Bahrain to hold accountable those responsible for human rights violations and put in place institutional changes to ensure that such abuses do not happen again".

UK Foreign Secretary William Hague welcomed the report and urged "all opposition groups to act on the report's recommendations, demonstrating their commitment to reconciliation and contributing to the process of renewal".

Catherine Ashton, High Representative of the Union for Foreign Affairs and Security Policy and Vice President of the European Commission, put pressure "upon all sides in Bahrain to do their utmost to implement the recommendations of the report, in a timely and complete fashion"

UN Secretary-General Ban Ki-moon called "on the government to ensure the implementation of its recommendations as a meaningful step in addressing serious allegations of human rights violations".

== Cases ==
- Zakariya Rashid Hassan al-Ashiri, a journalist and blogger, who according to the Committee to Protect Journalists was the first journalist to die in Bahrain since 1992 when the organization began keeping records.
- Ahmed Jaber al-Qattan was a 16-or-17-year-old boy who was killed from a shot to the abdomen at a protest.
- Ali Jawad al-Sheikh was a 14-year-old boy who was killed at a protest from a head wound.

== See also ==
- Human rights reports on Bahraini uprising (2011–present)
- Human Price of Freedom and Justice, a joint report by a group of Bahrain's independent human rights NGOs presenting the main key findings from the ongoing effort to document violations occurring in the state of Bahrain during the Bahraini uprising.
- Human rights in Bahrain
- Torture in Bahrain
