= Stand By for Pain =

1994 studio album by Widowmaker

Studio album by Widowmaker
- Released: October 10, 1994
- Genre: Heavy metal; hard rock
- Length: 53:32
- Label: CMC International; Music for Nations
- Producer: Rick Kerr; Widowmaker

Widowmaker chronology
Blood and Bullets (1992)	Stand By for Pain (1994)

Stand By for Pain is the second and final studio album by American heavy metal band Widowmaker, released on October 10, 1994.

== Background ==
Stand By for Pain was written, rehearsed, recorded, mixed and mastered between July 7 and August 24, 1994. Speaking of the fast turnaround for the album, frontman Dee Snider told The Weekender in 1995, "I'm crazy about this record. We did this thing in 30 days, and we did it how we wanted to do it. No worrying about how fast the 'hook' comes in a song." He also noted the "vast difference" between the band's debut album, Blood and Bullets, and Stand By for Pain, with the latter being "very much a '90s sounding record". For the album, Snider was influenced by a number of grunge bands popular at the time, including Soundgarden and Alice in Chains.

Prior to the US release of Stand By for Pain on October 10, 1994, two tracks, "Long Gone" and "Ready to Fall", were released to radio as a promotional single around September 26. "Killing Time", a song "about the inner mind of a serial killer, as expressed to [Snider] by a confidant of Joel Rifkin, was issued as the second and final promotional single from the album. Although the band toured to promote the album, it was not a commercial success and Widowmaker disbanded in 1995. In his 2012 autobiography Shut Up and Give Me the Mic: A Twisted Memoir, Snider recalled, "By the mid-nineties, with the advent of grunge, heavy metal – especially my brand – could not have been deader. The record-buying public had no interest in the way I sang, performed, looked, or wrote songs. Stand By for Pain [was] a great record [which] tried to embrace the changing times, but as one MTV executive put it, 'Kids want their own rock 'n' roll heroes, not their brothers'."

== Critical reception ==
Professional ratings
Review scores
Source	Rating
AllMusic	3/5 stars
Record-Journal	B
The Tampa Tribune	1/4 stars

Upon its release, Record-Journal praised Widowmaker as "a surprisingly dynamic, forceful group" with which Dee Snider "eschew[s] the overblown, kiddie metal anthems of Twisted Sister's brief but spectacular heyday". The reviewer commented, "There's some real substance on Stand By for Pain – solid, menacing rhythms, smart writing and a purposeful delivery that gives songs like 'Long Gone' and 'Ready to Fall' the kind of pop Sister always bragged about, but rarely delivered." Nanette Woitas of The Tampa Tribune noted the "scratchy, sometimes psychedelic guitar riffs and punching power chords", but felt the band's "promising aggressive energy is wasted on almost every song's irritating sameness". She also believed that, "except for the smattering of originality" in "Circles" and "Killing Time", Snider's "staccato screeching would be difficult to distinguish from the hordes of other Metallica wannabes".

== Track listing ==
No.	Title	Writer(s)	Length
1.	"Killing Time"	Dee Snider, Al Pitrelli	4:24
2.	"Long Gone"	Snider, Pitrelli	4:10
3.	"Protect and Serve"	Snider, Pitrelli	4:00
4.	"Ready to Fall"	Snider, Pitrelli	3:50
5.	"Circles"	Snider, Marc Russell	4:16
6.	"Stand By for Pain"	Snider	5:54
7.	"Just Business"	Snider	4:03
8.	"The Iron Road"	Snider, Bernie Tormé	4:25
9.	"Bad Rain"	Snider, Pitrelli	4:44
10.	"Your Sorrow"	Snider, Joe Franco	4:10
11.	"Cry a Dying Man's Tears"	Snider, Franco	4:40
12.	"All Things Must Change"	Snider, Pitrelli	5:07

1995 Japanese CD bonus track
No.	Title	Writer(s)	Length
13.	"Dying to Live"	Snider, Franco	3:45

== Personnel ==
Widowmaker

- Dee Snider – vocals
- Al Pitrelli – guitar, backing vocals (tracks 6, 9)
- Marc Russell – bass, backing vocals (track 7)
- Joe Franco – drums

Production

- Rick Kerr – production, mixing, tracking engineering
- Widowmaker – production
- Doug McGuirk – mix assistant engineering, tracking engineering
- Thomas R. Yezzi – additional engineering
- David Shackney – additional engineering
- Samantha Thomas – additional engineering
- Tom Napolitano – additional engineering
- Greg Calbi – mastering

Other

- Greg Bannan – photography
- Mark Weiss – photography
- Access of Miami – graphics
- F. Morgan – graphics
- K. Bodin – graphics
- M. Christianson – graphics
- T. Chung – graphics
