= Burn in Hell (Twisted Sister song) =

Song by Twisted Sister

from the album Stay Hungry
- Released: May 10, 1984
- Recorded: February–March 1984
- Studio: Record Plant (New York); Westlake (Los Angeles); Cherokee (Hollywood)
- Genre: Heavy metal
- Length: 4:43
- Label: Atlantic
- Songwriter: Dee Snider
- Producer: Tom Werman

"Burn in Hell" is a song by American heavy metal band Twisted Sister, originally released on their 1984 album Stay Hungry. The song has been described as being similar to the shock rock style of Alice Cooper.

== In popular culture ==
Twisted Sister performed "Burn in Hell" in a cameo appearance in Paul Reubens's 1985 film Pee-wee's Big Adventure, where the band is shown filming a mock music video for the song with Dee Snider atop a convertible and the band playing as Pee-wee races toward them before they jump out of the car. According to Dee Snider, Reubens specifically asked for "Burn in Hell" to be used in the scene.

== Covers ==
- Dimmu Borgir covered the song on their album Puritanical Euphoric Misanthropia.
- The Step Kings recorded a cover for the 2001 tribute compilation album Twisted Forever.
- Sabaton covered the song in their album The Last Stand.

== Personnel ==
- Dee Snider – lead vocals, backing vocals
- Eddie "Fingers" Ojeda – lead guitar
- Jay Jay French – rhythm guitar, lead guitar
- Mark "The Animal" Mendoza – bass
- A. J. Pero – drums, percussion
