= Dee Does Broadway =

Studio album by Dee Snider
- Released: May 8, 2012
- Recorded: 2009–2011
- Length: 46:37
- Label: Razor & Tie
- Producers: Bob Kulick; Brett Chassen; Dee Snider

Dee Snider chronology
Never Let the Bastards Wear You Down (2000)	Dee Does Broadway (2012)	We Are the Ones (2016)

Singles from Dee Does Broadway
- 1. "Cabaret" Released: 27 March 2012

Dee Does Broadway is the second album by Dee Snider, the frontman of Twisted Sister, after 12 years without any release. Guests in the album include the Grammy and Emmy Award-winning Cyndi Lauper, Clay Aiken and Nick Adams.

== Background ==
The original idea started in 2009 with an exchange of phone messages between Alice Cooper and Snider. Over several years, both had worked with the guitarist and producer Bob Kulick on his various "tribute" albums (Snider sang on a Cooper tribute record) and had both been impressed with the quality of his work.

In the autumn of 2010, Snider was starring in the hit Broadway musical Rock of Ages. The idea of doing an album of rocked-out show tunes himself appealed to him and a deal was struck with Razor & Tie, the only label that Snider's manager, Phil Carson, was sure could manage a record this unique. Their support and success with Twisted Sister's A Twisted Christmas gave Snider confidence in their ability to make an abstract project like this happen.

== Track listing ==
1. "Cabaret" - 3:55
2. "The Ballad of Sweeney Todd" - 3:32
3. "Big Spender" (with Cyndi Lauper) - 3:33
4. "Mack the Knife" - 3:26
5. "Whatever Lola Wants (Lola Gets)" (with Bebe Neuwirth) - 3:35
6. "Music of the Night" (with Mark Wood) - 4:51
7. "The Joint Is Jumpin'" (with Jesse Blaze Snider) - 3:23
8. "Luck Be a Lady Tonight" (with Clay Aiken) - 5:27
9. "I Get a Kick Out of You" - 4:21
10. "There Is Nothin' Like a Dame" (with Will Swenson, Tony Sheldon, Nick Adams) - 3:47
11. "Razzle Dazzle" - 3:33
12. "Tonight"/"Somewhere" (with Patti LuPone) - 3:26
