= Damien McCormack =

Australian rules footballer, born 1987

Personal information
- Born: 28 January 1987 (age 39)
- Original team: Dandenong Stingrays
- Debut: Round 15, 2006, Western Bulldogs vs. Carlton, at Telstra Dome
- Height: 183 cm (6 ft 0 in)
- Weight: 80 kg (176 lb)

Playing career^{1}
Years	Club	Games (Goals)
2006	Western Bulldogs	4 (0)
- ^{1} Playing statistics correct to the end of 2006.

Damien McCormack (born 28 January 1987) is an Australian rules footballer formerly on the Western Bulldogs list in the Australian Football League (AFL). Recruited from the Dandenong Stingrays Under 18's with the 38th pick in the 2004 National Draft, McCormack showed enough improvement throughout season 2005 to make the Werribee Tigers Grand Final side in the Victorian Football League competition. Having been allocated the number 28 guernsey, McCormack is listed at 183 cm and 80 kg.

He was delisted following the completion of the 2007 AFL season after failing to play any games with the senior team for the year.

McCormack spent the 2009 season with the South Australian National Football League team of Glenelg. After a promising pre-season, he underwent reconstructive surgery on his shoulder which ended his season. In 2009 he signed for the MPNFL side Seaford Tigers, where he played his junior football and participated in the club's third consecutive premiership.
