= Under the Blade (song) =

1979 song by Twisted Sister

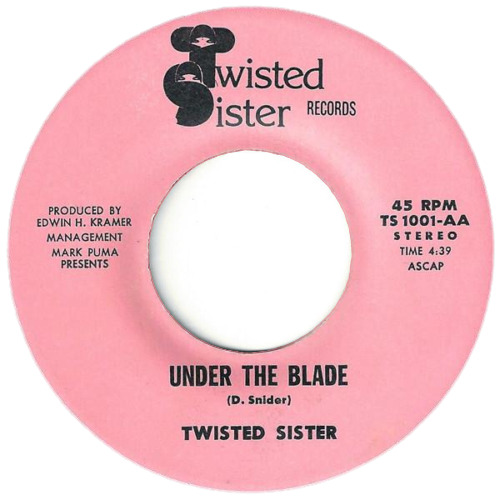

Song by Twisted Sister
- A-side: "I'll Never Grow Up, Now!"
- Released: 1979
- Recorded: November 1979
- Studio: Electric Lady Studios (Greenwich Village, New York City)
- Genre: Heavy metal
- Length: 4:39
- Label: Twisted Sister Records
- Songwriter: Dee Snider
- Producer: Eddie Kramer

"Under the Blade"

Song by Twisted Sister

from the album Under the Blade
- Released: September 1982
- Studio: The Barn at Kitchenham Farm (Ashburnham, East Sussex); I.C.C. Studios (Eastbourne, East Sussex); Maison Rouge (London, Greater London)
- Genre: Heavy metal
- Length: 4:40
- Label: Secret
- Producers: Pete Way, Mark Mendoza, Dee Snider

"Under the Blade" is a song by American heavy metal band Twisted Sister that appears as the B-side on their debut single, "I'll Never Grow Up, Now!" (1979). Continuing the band's departure from glam rock, the song is NWOBHM-influenced with raw production from Eddie Kramer. The lyrics, by frontman Dee Snider, are about guitarist Eddie Ojeda's fear of surgery, but were misinterpreted by the Parents Music Resource Center as being about sadomasochism, bondage, and rape.

The song was rerecorded as the title track on the band's debut studio album, Under the Blade (1982), produced by UFO/Waysted bassist Pete Way. While not released as a single, the song was a staple of Twisted Sister's live concerts, and was featured on many live and compilation albums.

== Background ==
In late December 1972, Manhattan resident John Segall (who later renamed himself "Jay Jay French") joined the glam rock band Silver Star, influenced by David Bowie, Slade, Mott the Hoople, the Rolling Stones, and the New York Dolls. They renamed to Twisted Sister a year later, and were active in the New York club circuit. With the hiring of frontman Danny Snider (Dee Snider) and drummer Tony Petri in early 1976, the band took a heavier musical direction with influences from Black Sabbath, Led Zeppelin, Slade, and Alice Cooper.

The band moved in a more heavy metal direction when beginning to record its demos in 1978, Around this time, guitarist Eddie Ojeda was scared of having to go to the hospital for a throat operation. This inspired Snider to write a song about the fear surgery can instill in people. The result was "Under the Blade", one of the four songs the band recorded at Electric Lady Studios in Greenwich Village, with Eddie Kramer as the producer, in November 1979. Also recorded were "Lady's Boy", "I'll Never Grow Up, Now" and "Leader of the Pack".

== Composition and lyrics ==
"Under the Blade" was declared a "world-beating heavy metal classic" by Canadian music journalist Martin Popoff, contrary to the punk-influence of "I'll Never Grow Up, Now!" The song draws heavily from the New Wave of British Heavy Metal, with start-stop structure and a raw, unpolished sound. Eduardo Rivadavia of Ultimate Classic Rock writes the song is "remorselessly heavy, unnerving in the extreme, and rawer than sushi," unlike the "PG-13-rated melodic rockers that would cross the band over to the mainstream just a couple of years later."

In 1985, the Parents Music Resource Center named "Under the Blade" as one of Twisted Sister's objectionable songs, claiming that it was about sadomasochism, bondage, and rape. Tracks by Judas Priest, Motley Crue, AC/DC, Black Sabbath and Venom also found themselves under scrutiny. The band's frontman and the song's author, Dee Snider, denied the claims in a testimony before a United States Senate committee in response to questioning by Senator Albert Gore Jr.:

"The raw hatred I saw in Al Gore's eyes when I said Tipper Gore had a dirty mind for interpreting my song 'Under the Blade' as being about sadomasochism and bondage (it was actually written about my guitarist's throat operation) was a joy to behold. They really should have vetted me better before allowing me in to speak."

== Release ==
"I'll Never Grow Up, Now!" is the first official release by Twister Sister, and consists of two tracks the band had recorded at Electric Lady Studios, the titular track as the A-side, and "Under the Blade" as the B-side. By the late 1970s, Twisted Sister were one of the most popular bar bands in the New York metropolitan area, but were still unsigned, so the group started its own record label. It released the single in 1979, that eventually made it over to the UK and caught the attention of Martin Hooker, the president of indie label Secret Records, a small British label that was mainly a punk outlet. The 7" had no chart success, and nowadays, is seen as one of the rarest Twisted Sister collectible vinyls.

On the suggestion of two reporters from Sounds and Kerrang! magazines, Twisted Sister left New York to find a label in the UK. There, in April 1982, they were finally signed by Secret Records. While the band were recording their debut studio album, the head of the label, Martin Hooker, proposed capitalising on some of the band's buzz in the British music press by releasing an EP to "cope with demand for Twisted Sister product" and provide "a taster of what's to come" on their debut album. Ruff Cutts was released in July 1982 and consisted of four demos by the band, including "Under the Blade".

At the same time, Twister Sister were working on their debut studio album and recorded the song "You Can't Stop Rock 'n' Roll" as the title track, but Hooker blocked this idea. "For some reason, at that time, songs and album titles with the words 'rock 'n' roll' in them were out of vogue in the U.K." Snider explained in his autobiography, Shut Up and Give Me the Mic (2012). Instead, a re-recording of "Under the Blade" was chosen as the title track. "You Can't Stop Rock 'n' Roll" was given a second life as the title track on the band's second studio album and major label debut of the same name (1983). Both versions of "Under the Blade" are similar, but the 1982 version has better production and is a second shorter.

== Critical reception ==
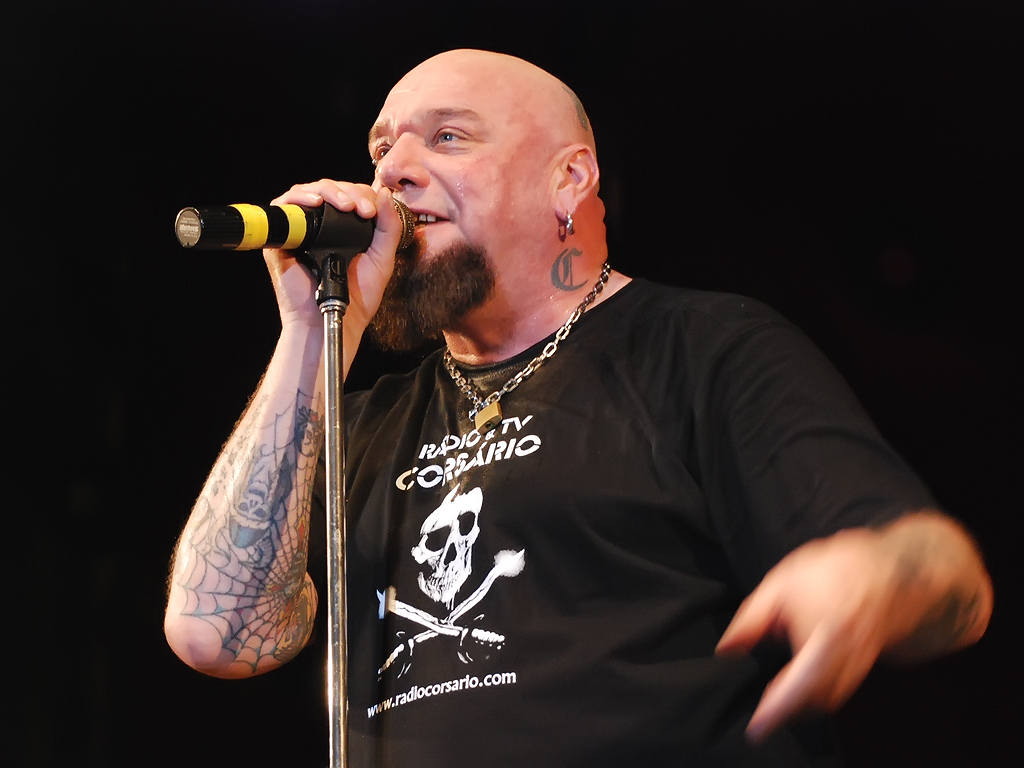
"Under the Blade" has been compared to Iron Maiden's albums with Paul Di'Anno

While not one of the band's most popular songs, "Under the Blade" is a favorite of fans and critics alike. Greg Prato of AllMusic described the song as "chilling" and "one of the band's best," while the 1979 version has "more of a punk edge." John Stoney Cannon of Sleaze Roxx joked that "despite being called Twisted Sister and looking like wrestlers in drag, the band definitely didn't sound wimpy" as proof by "Under the Blade", a "blistering classic sounding closer to Paul Di'Anno era Iron Maiden than Sister's New York counterparts." Adrien Begrand of PopMatters agreed the title track is the best song on Under the Blade, a "maniacal piece of shock rock" with an "inspired" performance by Snider, and "taut riffs" by French and Ojeda.

Eduardo Rivadavia of Ultimate Classic Rock ranked the song at #3 on his "Top 10 Twisted Sister Songs" list, writing that "the title cut from Twisted Sister's first full-length was a far cry from the comparatively PG-13-rated melodic rockers that would cross the band over to the mainstream just a couple of years later." Canadian music journalist Martin Popoff was even more impressed by "Under the Blade", not only putting it #1 on his "The 20 best Twisted Sister songs, ranked" list and stating "this is an action-packed classic from the decimating debut that had every angry young metalhead at the time wild about Twisted Sister," but also included the song at #413 in his book "The Top 500 Heavy Metal Songs of All Time" (2004).

== Personnel ==
"I'll Never Grow Up, Now!" version

- Dee Snider – lead vocals
- Eddie "Fingers" Ojeda – lead & rhythm guitar, backing vocals
- Jay Jay French – rhythm & lead guitar, backing vocals
- Mark "The Animal" Mendoza – bass, backing vocals
- Tony Petri – drums, percussion

Under the Blade version

- Dee Snider – lead vocals
- Eddie "Fingers" Ojeda – lead & rhythm guitar, backing vocals
- Jay Jay French – rhythm & lead guitar, backing vocals
- Mark "The Animal" Mendoza – bass, backing vocals
- A. J. Pero – drums, percussion
