= Human rights reports on the 2011 Bahraini uprising =

Many human rights reports were published about the Bahraini uprising of 2011, a campaign of protests, and civil disobedience in the Persian Gulf state of Bahrain that is considered part of the revolutionary wave of protests dubbed the Arab Spring. At least 14 human rights reports were issued by 18 different parties: Amnesty International, International Crisis Group, Doctors Without Borders, Physicians for Human Rights, Human Rights First, Independent Irish figures, Human Rights Watch, Human Rights Without Frontiers, Bahrain Centre for Human Rights, Bahrain Youth Society for Human Rights, Bahrain Human Rights Society, Bahrain Independent Commission of Inquiry, Arabic Network for Human Rights Information, Front Line Defenders, Gulf Centre for Human Rights, Index on Censorship, International Media Support and the Writers in Prison Committee (WiPC) of PEN International.

== Background ==
As part of a string of protests that occurred across the Arab World following the self-immolation and eventual death of Mohammed Bouazizi in Tunisia, the mostly Shia population of Bahrain took to the streets demanding greater freedoms. The move was seen as potentially destabilising to the Sunni-led regime of Bahrain, following which a brutal government crackdown led to widespread suppressions of the Shia people across many sectors, especially the medical field after the invasion of Bahrain by Gulf Cooperation Council soldiers led by Saudi Arabia. The Bahraini government also hired Pakistani mercenaries to maintain security against the protesters, however, lesser intermittent protests continued.

== Amnesty International ==
After identifying some of the U.S. and French-made ammunition found in the aftermath of the raid on Pearl Roundabout on 17 February, Amnesty International urged at least 10 countries who supply weapons to Bahrain, including Germany, France, Britain and the United States, to

immediately suspend the transfer of weapons, munitions and related equipment that could be used to commit further human rights violations, and to urgently review all arms supplies and training support to Bahrain's military, security and police forces.

== International Crisis Group ==
=== The Bahrain Revolt ===
"Popular protests in North Africa and the Middle East (III): The Bahrain Revolt" is a 28-page report published on 6 April 2011 by the International Crisis Group. According to the group, the report "urges immediate third-party facilitation of a dialogue between the regime and the opposition with a view toward genuine political reform, defusing sectarian tensions and preventing further regionalisation of the unrest." The report, the third in an ongoing series that analyses the wave of popular protests across North Africa and the Middle East, describes the background and course of the current revolt, as well as key Bahrain players, their interests and positions.

=== Bahrain's Rocky Road to Reform ===
"Popular Protest in North Africa and the Middle East (VIII): Bahrain's Rocky Road to Reform" is a 36-page report published on 28 July 2011 by the International Crisis Group. The group says the report "examines the situation in the island kingdom five months after the outbreak of the mass protest, which was followed by brutal government repression."

== Doctors Without Borders ==
"Health Services Paralyzed: Bahrain's Military Crackdown on Patients" is a 6-page report by Doctors Without Borders (Médecins Sans Frontières) published on 7 April 2011. The fear is not unfounded. Wounds were used to identify demonstrators, restricted access to health care is being used to deter people from protesting, and those who dare to seek treatment in health facilities were being arrested. Doctors Without Borders quotes their medical coordinator: "Wounds, especially those inflicted by distinctive police and military gunfire, are used to identify people for arrest, and the denial of medical care is being used by Bahraini authorities to deter people from protesting ... Health facilities are used as bait to identify and arrest those who dare seek treatment."

== Physicians for Human Rights ==
"Do No Harm" is a 42-page report published by Physicians for Human Rights in April 2011 that "documents and decries systematic human rights abuses in Bahrain during the February and March 2011 political unrest, and the persecution of doctors, nurses, medics, ambulance drivers, and other health workers based on their knowledge of those abuses."

=== Reception ===
Agence France-Presse said that the report has blasted and slammed 'systematic attacks' on medical staff in Bahrain. The report was featured on several major news outlets including the Associated Press, AFP, BBC, CNN, the Independent, New York Times, and Washington Post.

== Human Rights First ==
=== Speaking Softly ===
"Bahrain: Speaking Softly" is a 12-page report published by Human Rights First on 17 May 2011 following a one-week fact-finding mission to Bahrain. In this report, Human Rights First says it "publishes first-hand testimonies of the Bahraini government's crackdown from the perspectives of human rights defenders currently in Bahrain, and provides recommendations for the U.S. and Bahraini governments to end human rights abuses."

=== A Tortuous Process ===
"Bahrain: A Tortuous Process" is 15-page report published by Human Rights First on 14 July 2011 that documents how the Bahraini government continues to intimidate, torture, and detain human rights defenders, and shoot at civilians."

=== No More Excuses ===
"No More Excuses – Time for Radical Change" is a 16-page report published by Human Rights First on 12 December 2011 which documents "thousands of illegal arrests, widespread torture in detention, forced confessions and deaths in custody." According to the group, "the report reveals that around 160 policemen continue to face charges for refusing to join in the violent government crackdown on protesters and features details from the latest hearing for 20 medics currently facing prosecution for treating injured protestors."

=== The Gathering Storm ===
"Bahrain: The Gathering Storm" is a 9-page report published by Human Rights First on 6 February 2012 which provides "evidence of ongoing abuse [including] a copy of government orders for medical workers to report all injuries to authorities or face prosecution, and first-person accounts from members of the Bahraini police force who were arrested and abused because they refused to participate in the Kingdom's brutal crackdown."

== Irish Fact Finding Delegation ==
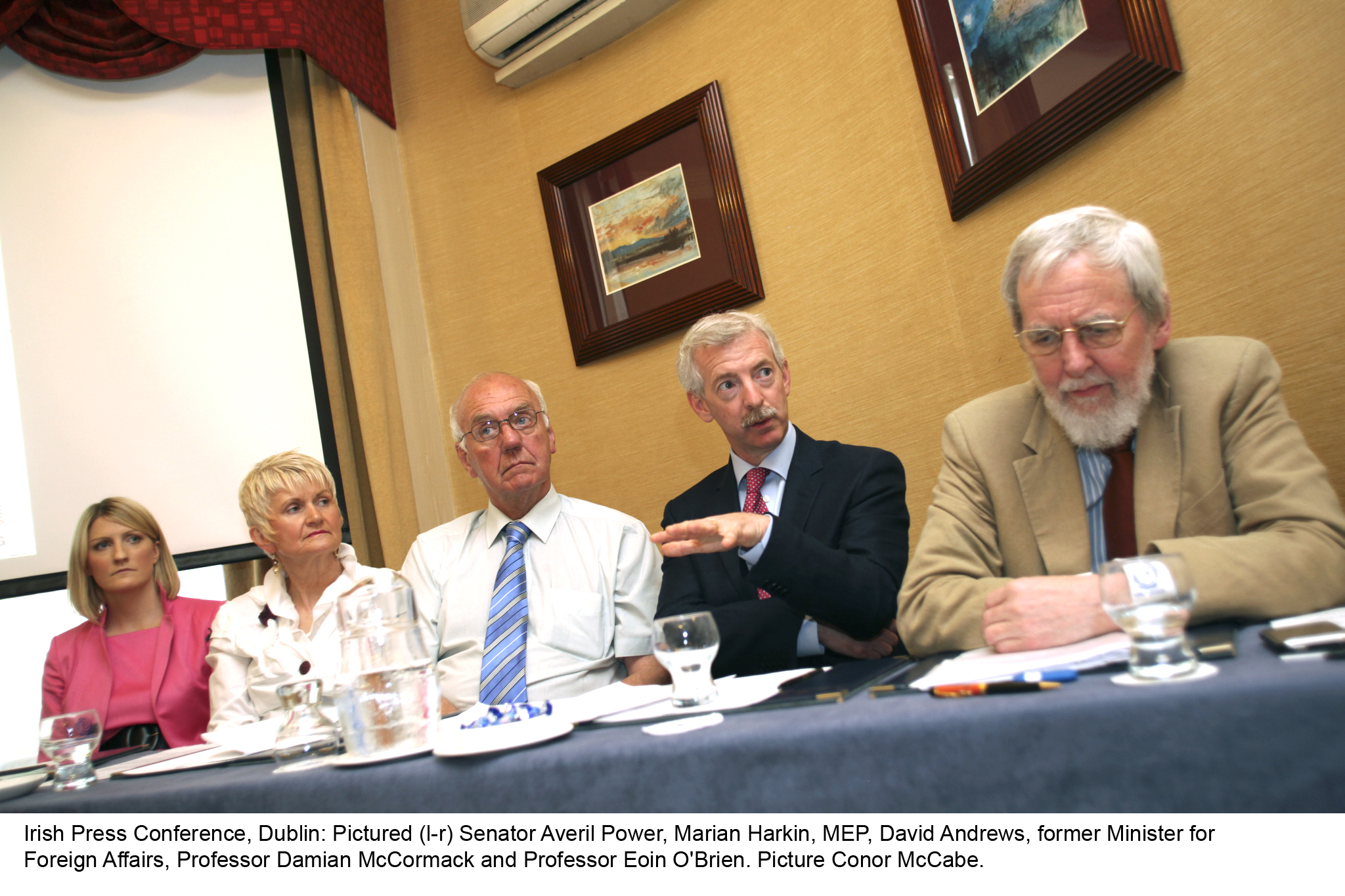
Irish Press Conference in Dublin on 15 July 2011

The Irish fact finding delegation was a two-day fact-finding mission composed of a group of Irish doctors, politicians and human rights representatives led by orthopaedic surgeon Damien McCormack who visited Bahrain in mid July 2011 to determine the condition and secure the release of more than a dozen doctors and medical staff detained on anti-government charges during the 2011-2012 Bahraini uprising. According to Mr Andrew Anderson, of Front Line the primary purpose of the trip was to visit the families of those in custody to offer support and to gather information about alleged mistreatment of the detainees.

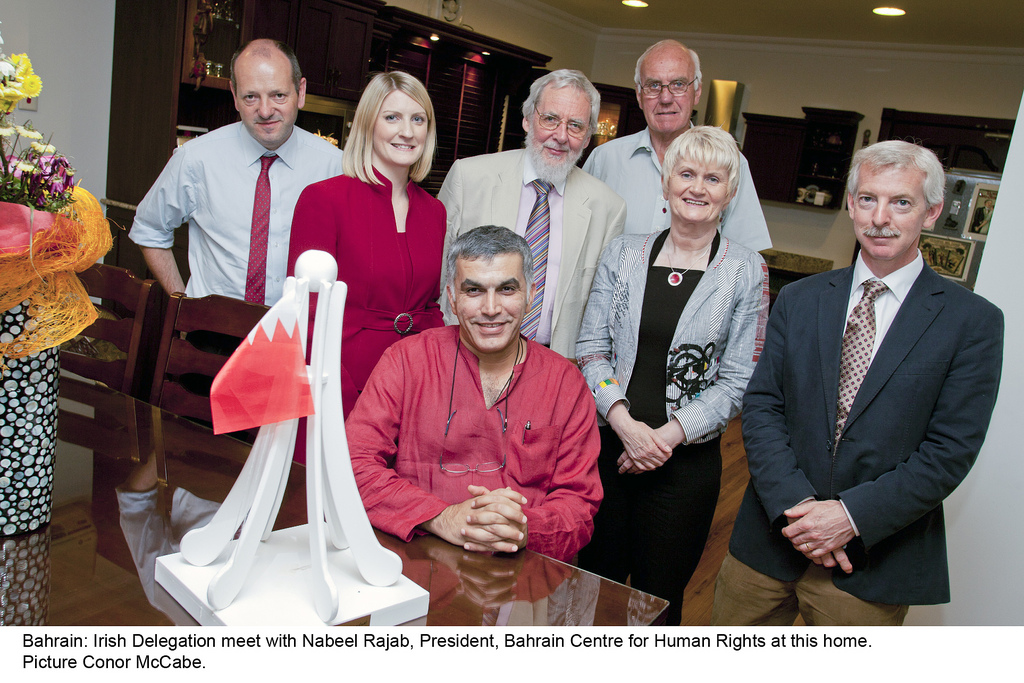
Irish Delegation meet with Nabeel Rajab, president of BCHR at his home

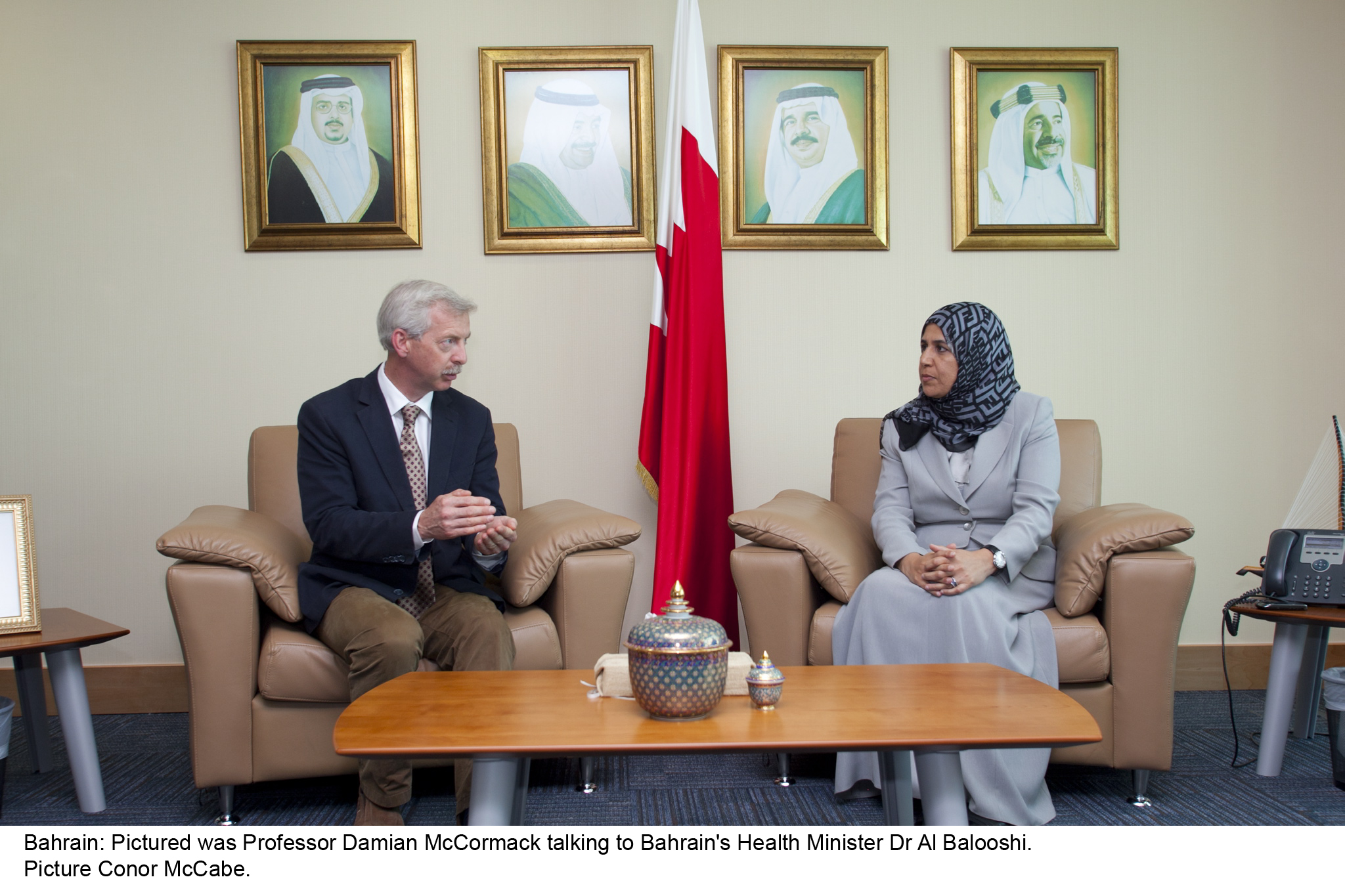
Irish delegation meetings with Bahrain's Health Minister Dr Al Balooshi

The delegation requested meetings with senior Bahraini officials, including Bahrain's King Hamad bin Isa Al Khalifa. Members included:

- Professor Damien McCormack
- Senator Averil Power
- Marian Harkin, MEP
- David Andrews
- Professor Eoin O'Brien
- Andrew Anderson

== Human Rights Watch ==
"Targets of Retribution" is a 54-page report issued by Human Rights Watch on July 18, 2011 that "documents serious government abuses, starting in mid-February 2011 ... includ[ing] attacks on health care providers; denial of medical access to protesters injured by security forces; the siege of hospitals and health centers; and the detention, ill-treatment, torture, and prosecution of medics and patients with protest-related injuries.

== Human Rights Without Frontiers ==
"Which Future for Bahrain? Preliminary report of a fact-finding mission in Bahrain" is a 41-report published by Human Rights Without Frontiers on 28 October 2011. The mission aimed to study the functioning of the Bahrain Independent Commission of Inquiry and the "National Dialogue" process and judge the short-term prospects of reform and democratisation in Bahrain, and to see if European Union institutions were having an impact on the processes.

== Local non-governmental organisations ==
"The Human Price of Freedom and Justice" is a joint report by a group of Bahrain's independent human rights NGOs "presenting the main key findings from the ongoing effort to document violations occurring in the state of Bahrain in 2011."

== Bahrain Independent Commission of Inquiry ==
The Bahrain Independent Commission of Inquiry (BICI), also known locally in Bahrain as the "Bassiouni Commission", was established by the King of Bahrain on 29 June 2011 tasked with looking into the incidents that occurred during the period of unrest in Bahrain in February and March 2011 and the consequences of these events.

== International rights groups ==
"Justice Denied in Bahrain" is a 27-page report published by six international rights groups on 23 January 2012.

== See also ==
- Human Rights in Bahrain
- Torture in Bahrain
