= Widowmaker (American band) =

American heavy metal band

- Origin: United States
- Genres: Hard rock, heavy metal
- Years active: 1991–1994
- Labels: Esquire, Music for Nations, Sony Music Japan, CMC International
- Past members: Dee Snider; Al Pitrelli; Joey Franco; Marc Russell; Freddy Villano

Widowmaker was an American hard rock/heavy metal band formed by Dee Snider in 1991 after the demise of his previous band, Desperado.

The line-up consisted of Snider and fellow former Desperado member Marc Russell on bass, drummer Joey Franco who had played on the Twisted Sister album, Love Is for Suckers, and guitarist Al Pitrelli, fresh off his stint with Alice Cooper.

They recorded two albums and toured the country in support but ultimately disbanded. Dee Snider went on to a number of other projects, including a reunion of Twisted Sister.

== Members ==
- Dee Snider – vocals (1992–1994)
- Al Pitrelli – guitars, keyboards, backing vocals (1992–1994)
- Marc Russell – bass, backing vocals (1992–1994)
- Joey Franco – drums (1992–1994)

Touring members

- Freddy Villano – bass, backing vocals (1994)

== Discography ==
- Blood and Bullets (1992)
- Stand By for Pain (1994)
