= Stay Hungry (album) =

- Cover photo by Mark Weiss

Studio album by Twisted Sister
- Released: May 10, 1984
- Recorded: February–March 1984
- Studios: Record Plant (New York); Westlake (Los Angeles); Cherokee (Hollywood)
- Genres: Heavy metal, glam metal
- Length: 36:58
- Label: Atlantic
- Producer: Tom Werman

Twisted Sister chronology
You Can't Stop Rock 'n' Roll (1983)	Stay Hungry (1984)	Come Out and Play (1985)

Singles from Stay Hungry
- 1. "We're Not Gonna Take It" Released: May 1984; 2. "I Wanna Rock" Released: October 1984; 3. "The Price" Released: December 1984

Stay Hungry is the third studio album by American heavy metal band Twisted Sister, released on May 10, 1984, by Atlantic Records. It contains the band's two signature songs, "We're Not Gonna Take It" and "I Wanna Rock", both of which remain a staple of '80s glam metal. According to RIAA, Stay Hungry is the band's most successful release by far and their only platinum album. Eventually, the album achieved multi-platinum status in the U.S. with sales of more than 3 million copies by 1995.

During recording, producer Tom Werman brought some songs by English heavy metal band Saxon for the band to listen to, which led to a conflict with Dee Snider who understood it as Werman wanting the band to replace some of his songs with Saxon covers. Guitarist Jay Jay French also claims the band lost two songs that they wanted on the album due to Werman's influence.

Twisted Sister performed the song "Burn in Hell" during a cameo appearance in the 1985 film Pee-wee's Big Adventure. The two songs that comprise the Horror-Teria segment became the basis of Twisted Sister lead singer Dee Snider's 1998 film Strangeland, in which Captain Howdy was played by Snider himself.

In 2004, the band re-recorded all nine songs from this album and re-released them under the title Still Hungry. In 2009, the band played Stay Hungry in its entirety for the first time including songs never played live before, such as "Don't Let Me Down" and "Horror-Teria: Street Justice".

== Reception ==
Professional ratings
Review scores
Source	Rating
AllMusic	4.5/5 stars
Collector's Guide to Heavy Metal	7/10
IGN	7.5/10
Ultimate Guitar Archive	8.9/10

Metal Rules ranked the album fifth on their list of the Top 50 Glam Metal Albums. In 2016, Loudwire ranked it at number 6 on their list of the Top 30 Hair Metal Albums. In 2017, Rolling Stone listed the album at number 76 on its list of the 100 Greatest Metal Albums of All Time.

== Track listing ==
All songs are written by Dee Snider.

Side one
No.	Title	Length
1.	"Stay Hungry"	3:03
2.	"We're Not Gonna Take It"	3:38
3.	"Burn in Hell"	4:43
4.	"Horror-Teria (The Beginning): a) Captain Howdy b) Street Justice"	7:45

Side two
No.	Title	Length
5.	"I Wanna Rock"	3:06
6.	"The Price"	3:48
7.	"Don't Let Me Down"	4:26
8.	"The Beast"	3:30
9.	"S.M.F."	3:00

== 25th anniversary edition ==
A 25th anniversary edition was released on June 30, 2009, by Rhino Records. The first disc contains remastered versions of the nine tracks from the May 1984 original. The bonus disc uncovers 15 unreleased outtakes and early demos from the original sessions, recorded in December 1983 at Nino's Studios, Baldwin, New York, as well as the new track "30" recorded especially for this collection by the 1984 lineup at Audio Magic, West Babylon, New York.

Additionally, any music fan who bought the CD or vinyl of the 25th anniversary edition in any participating independent record store received a free gift from the band: a DVD of the Twisted Sister 1984 Uncut Live at San Bernardino concert. Originally broadcast on MTV as Stay Hungry Live, the concert had been commercially unavailable for years and previously unavailable as DVD. June 30, 2009, was the only day the DVD was available and only through participating, independent record stores with a limited stock.

Commented guitarist Jay Jay French, "While other bands have made exclusive deals with big box chains and discounters, Twisted Sister remembers all the independent record shops who have supported us through the years."

=== Bonus disc ===
1. "Death from Above" – 2:42
2. "Prime Motivator" – 2:25
3. "We're Not Gonna Take It" – 2:47 (early demo)
4. "Death Run" – 1:45
5. "This One's for You" – 2:00
6. "S.M.F." – 2:14 (early demo)
7. "We're Coming On" – 1:42
8. "Call My Name" – 2:10
9. "Burn in Hell" – 5:08 (early demo)
10. "Pay the Price" – 1:42
11. "What's Love Without You" – 1:44
12. "Our Voice Will Be Heard" – 1:29
13. "You Got to Fight" – 1:39
14. "The Price" – 2:36 (early demo)
15. "Stay Hungry" – 1:58 (early demo)
16. "KMET Radio Spot" – 0:24
17. "30" – 4:23 (new track)
18. "Lollipop Guild" – 0:30 (hidden track)

== Personnel ==
=== Twisted Sister ===
- Dee Snider – lead vocals
- Eddie "Fingers" Ojeda – lead guitar, backing vocals
- Jay Jay French – rhythm guitar, lead guitar on "Stay Hungry", "S.M.F." co lead guitar on "Burn In Hell", "Don't Let Me Down", backing vocals
- Mark "The Animal" Mendoza – bass, backing vocals
- A. J. Pero – drums, percussion, backing vocals

=== Additional musicians ===
- Dean Werman, Gabby McGachan, Neidermeyer – sound effects, handclapping

=== Production ===
- Tom Werman – producer, arrangements with Twisted Sister
- Geoff Workman – engineer, mixing
- Gary McGachan – additional engineer at Cherokee Studios
- John "Red" Agnello – additional engineer at Record Plant
- Greg Laney – additional engineer at Westlake Studio
- George Marino – mastering at Sterling Sound, New York
- Bob Defrin – art direction

== Charts ==
=== Weekly charts ===
Chart (1984–85)	Peak position
Australian Albums (Kent Music Report)	21
Canada Top Albums/CDs (RPM)	6
Finnish Albums (The Official Finnish Charts)	10
German Albums (Offizielle Top 100)	48
New Zealand Albums (RMNZ)	10
Norwegian Albums (VG-lista)	11
Swedish Albums (Sverigetopplistan)	3
UK Albums (Official Charts)	34
US Billboard 200	15

Chart (2024)	Peak position
Hungarian Physical Albums (MAHASZ)	15

=== Year-end charts ===
Chart (1984)	Peak position
Canada Top Albums/CDs (RPM)	40
US Billboard 200	95

Chart (1985)	Peak position
Canada Top Albums/CDs (RPM)	31
US Billboard 200	96

== Certifications ==
Region	Certification	Certified units/sales
Australia (ARIA)	Platinum	70,000^{^}
Canada (Music Canada)	5× Platinum	500,000^{^}
Mexico (AMPROFON)	Gold	100,000^{^}
New Zealand (RMNZ)	Platinum	15,000^{^}
New Zealand (RMNZ) Sales + streams	Gold	7,500^{‡}
Norway (IFPI Norway)	Silver	25,000
Sweden (GLF)	Platinum	100,000^{^}
United States (RIAA)	3× Platinum	3,000,000^{^}
^{^} Shipments figures based on certification alone.^{‡} Sales+streaming figures based on certification alone.
