= I Wanna Rock =

Single by Twisted Sister

from the album Stay Hungry
- Released: October 1984
- Genre: Heavy metal; glam metal
- Length: 3:00
- Label: Atlantic
- Songwriter: Dee Snider
- Producer: Tom Werman

Twisted Sister singles chronology
"We're Not Gonna Take It" (1984)	"I Wanna Rock" (1984)	"The Price" (1984)

Music video
- "I Wanna Rock" on YouTube

"I Wanna Rock" is a song written and composed by Dee Snider and performed by his band Twisted Sister. It was released on the 1984 album Stay Hungry.

== Reception ==
Cash Box called the song "an exercise in hard rocking" that doesn't break new ground but "does what it does well." Billboard said that Twisted Sister "strip down their stadium-sized sound to a minimum of power chords and slogan lyrics."

In 2009, "I Wanna Rock" was named the 17th-Greatest Hard Rock Song by VH1.

== Music video ==
Like the earlier "We're Not Gonna Take It", the video features actor Mark Metcalf, best known as the abusive ROTC leader Douglas C. Neidermeyer from the movie National Lampoon's Animal House.

In the video, he plays a teacher with a similar personality to Neidermeyer, who harasses a student for drawing the Twisted Sister logo on one of his textbooks. He chastises the student by shouting, "What kind of a man desecrates a defenseless textbook?! I've got a good mind to slap your fat face!", which echoes a line from Animal House ("What kind of man hits a defenseless animal [a misbehaving horse]? I've got a good mind to smash your fat face in!").

Metcalf's character reprises his question from the "We're Not Gonna Take It" video, "What do you want to do with your life?!" This provides a lead-in for the track, as the student answers with the first line of the song, "I wanna rock!", after which he and four of his classmates are instantly transformed into Twisted Sister's five members.

The abusive teacher's repeated attempts to stop his rock-loving students not only fail; they also backfire on him. He crawls into the school principal's office, only to be confronted by the principal, played by Stephen Furst, who played Kent "Flounder" Dorfman in Animal House, opposite Metcalf. Furst's character, who suddenly approves Twisted Sister and its music, reprises one of his lines from the movie, "Oh boy, is this great!", before he sprays water from a seltzer bottle at the teacher, who collapses in defeat.

== SpongeBob parody ==
"Goofy Goober Rock", a parody of the song, was performed in The SpongeBob SquarePants Movie (2004) by voice actor Jim Wise and musician Tom Rothrock.

Dee Snider explained the experience of licensing the song for SpongeBob by saying, "Are you kidding me? This is my music. This is my art. How much? They paid me a lot of money. It's called Goofy Goober Rock. God bless 'SpongeBob SquarePants.'"

The song was released on the album The SpongeBob SquarePants Movie – Music from the Movie and More.... Nerdist ranked "Goofy Goober Rock" as the fourth-best song from the SpongeBob series.

== Charts ==
Chart (1984)	Peak position
Argentina	4
Australia (Kent Music Report)	43
Canada Top Singles (RPM)	44
New Zealand (Recorded Music NZ)	10
Norway (VG-lista)	5
South Africa (Springbok Radio)	3
Sweden (Sverigetopplistan)	10
UK Singles (Official Charts)	93
US Billboard Hot 100	68
US Mainstream Rock Airplay (Billboard)	35

== Certifications ==
Region	Certification	Certified units/sales
Canada (Music Canada)	2× Platinum	200,000^{^}
^{^} Shipments figures based on certification alone.
