= Dee Snider =

American heavy metal singer (born 1955)

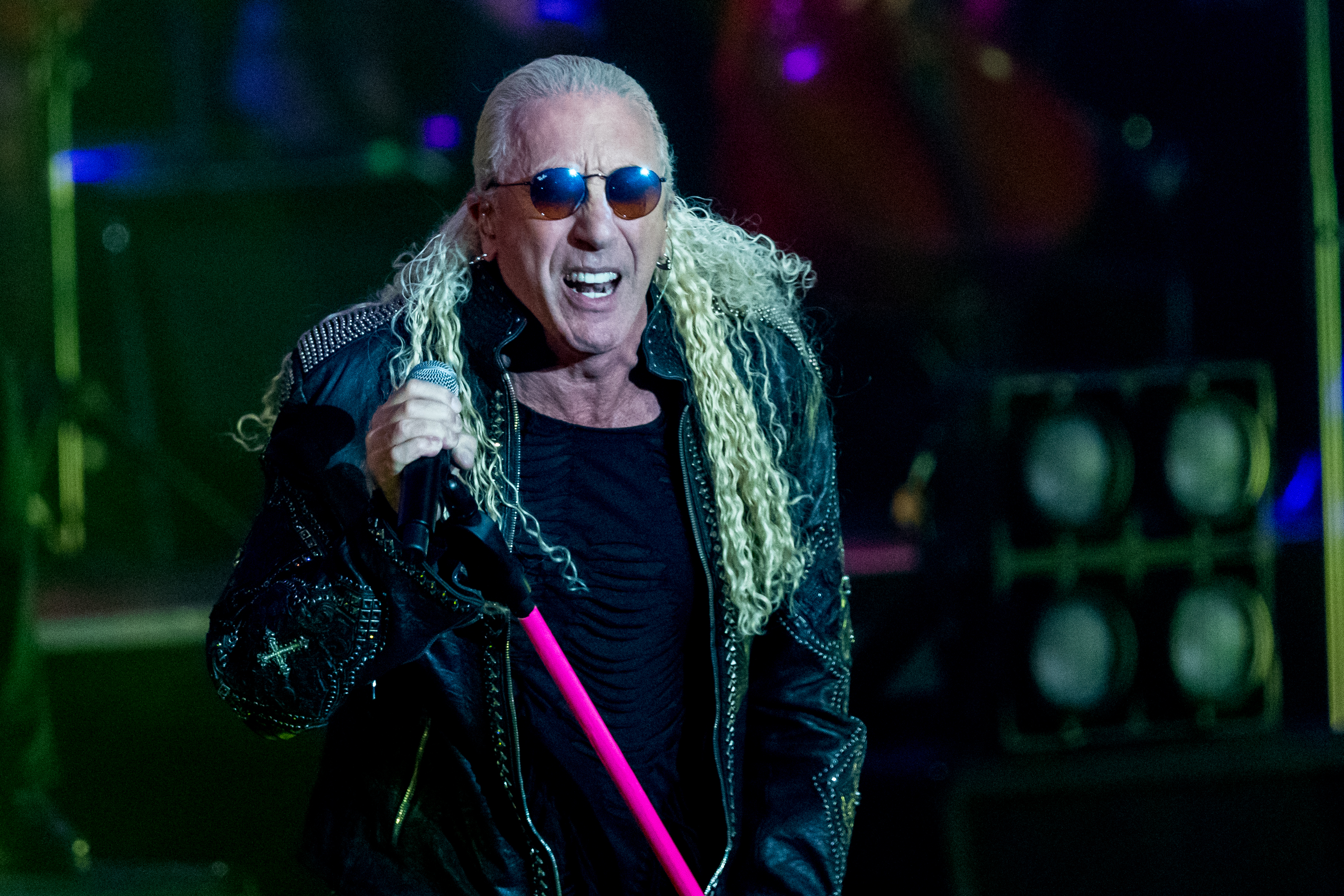
- Snider performing in 2023

Background information
- Born: Daniel Snider; March 15, 1955 (age 71); New York City, U.S.
- Genres: Heavy metal; glam metal; hard rock; shock rock
- Occupations: Singer; songwriter; actor; media personality
- Years active: 1976–present
- Member of: Van Helsing's Curse; Telergy
- Formerly of: Twisted Sister; Bent Brother; Desperado; Widowmaker; SMFs (Sick Mutha Fuckers)
- Spouse: Suzette Gargiulo Snider (m. 1981)
- Website: deesnider.com

Daniel "Dee" Snider (born March 15, 1955) is an American musician, radio, and television personality best known as the former lead singer and songwriter of the heavy metal band Twisted Sister. The band's 1984 song "We're Not Gonna Take It" reached No. 21 on the Billboard Hot 100 singles chart and was ranked No. 47 on 100 Greatest '80s Songs. Snider later formed and was the lead singer in the heavy metal bands Desperado, Widowmaker, and SMFs (Sick Mutha Fuckers). He also released several solo albums. Snider was ranked No. 83 in the Hit Parader's Top 100 Metal Vocalists of All Time.

== Early life ==
Daniel Snider was born in the Astoria neighborhood of New York City's Queens borough on March 15, 1955, the son of art teacher Marguerite (November 17, 1932 — January 2, 2018) and New York State Trooper (and later Nassau County court clerk) Bob Snider. He has Swiss and Ukrainian ancestry. Although his mother was Catholic and his father was Jewish, he and his siblings were raised as Episcopalians after his mother converted. He grew up in the Long Island towns of Baldwin and Freeport. He sang in a church choir, school choruses, and concert choirs in high school. He was selected for the All-State Chorus for singing. He graduated from Baldwin Senior High School in 1973.

== Music career ==
=== Twisted Sister ===
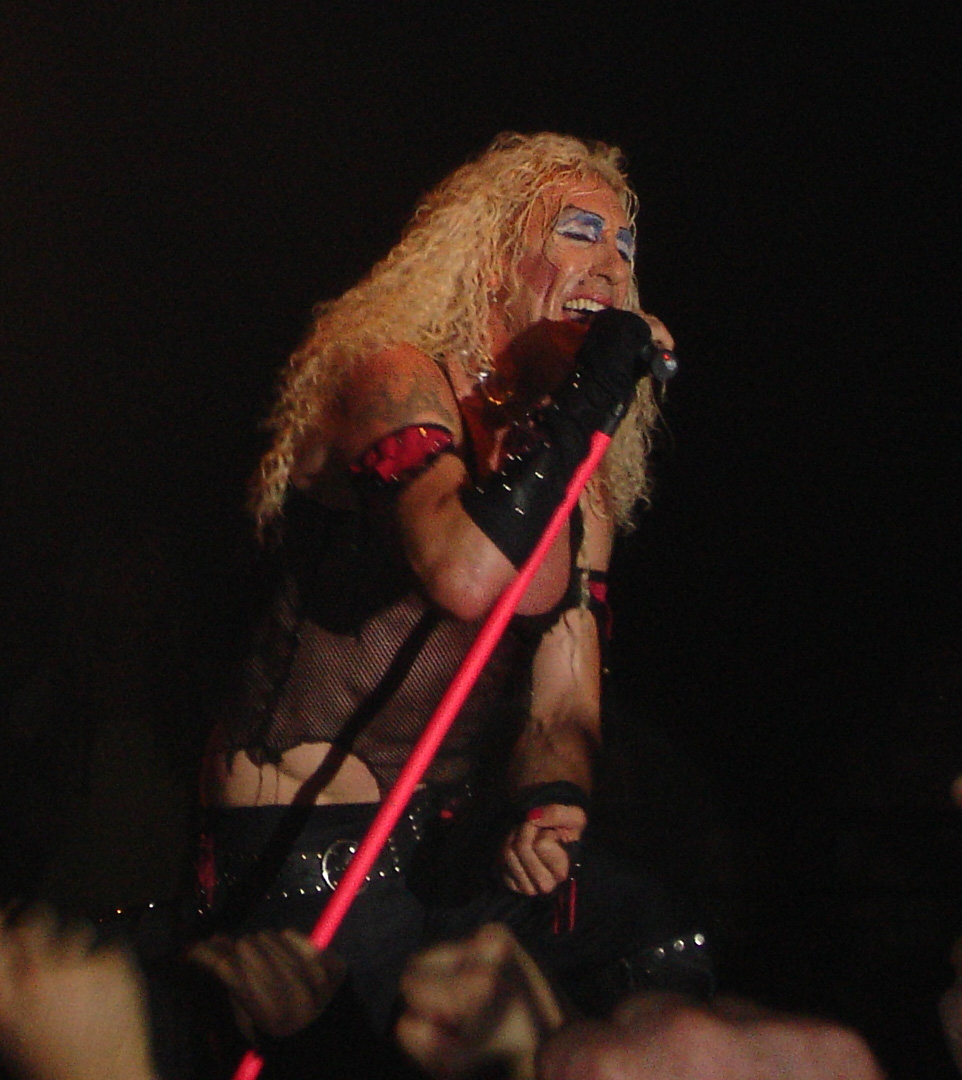
Snider performing in Manchester, England, in his iconic stage makeup

In early 1976, Snider joined Twisted Sister and became the band's sole songwriter. He has explained that as the younger suburban newcomer among older New York City musicians, he initially felt alienated and was treated "like the kid." After attempts at co-writing failed, he worked largely alone, developing melodies and lyrics while bandmates socialized or partied; he would present finished ideas (including basic guitar and drum parts) to the group. This approach continued throughout the classic albums, with Snider receiving sole songwriting credit. To emphasize the "Twisted Sister" image, Snider adopted a trademark persona of metal-inspired drag with long blond curly hair, an excessive amount of eye shadow and rouge, a beauty mark, and bright red lipstick.

==== Under the Blade (1982) ====
The group released their debut studio album, Under the Blade, in September 1982 and developed a following in the UK. Snider provided lead vocals and wrote all the material. One early song, the title track, was inspired by guitarist Eddie Ojeda’s fear of impending throat surgery. Around this time, Snider married costume designer Suzette Gargiulo and had his first child, Jesse Blaze Snider, who was born on September 19, 1982. The family lived a relatively grounded life on Long Island, with Snider maintaining a straight-edge lifestyle (no alcohol or drugs) that stood in contrast to typical rock excess.

==== You Can't Stop Rock 'n' Roll (1983) ====
Less than a year later, Twisted Sister released their second album, You Can't Stop Rock 'n' Roll. Snider again handled lead vocals and songwriting on the band’s first major-label release. He routinely worked ahead, developing ideas for future material during recording sessions. During the making of this album at Jimmy Page’s Sol Studios in England, he wrote "The Price" (later used on Stay Hungry) in the studio bathroom, reflecting the loneliness of being away from his wife and infant son for months without the means to contact them easily. The period was still one of financial struggle for the band.

==== Stay Hungry (1984) and testifying against PMRC ====
Their third album, Stay Hungry, hit shelves on May 10, 1984. This became the band's most successful record with the hits "We're Not Gonna Take It" and "I Wanna Rock". "We're Not Gonna Take It" reached No. 2 on the UK singles chart and No. 21 on the Billboard Hot 100 singles chart, and was ranked No. 47 on 100 Greatest 80's Songs.

In 1985, Snider was involved in a Senate hearing instigated by the Parents Music Resource Center (PMRC), which sought to introduce a parental warning system that would label all albums containing what they considered offensive material. Before the appearance by PMRC in Congress, they had singled out a list of songs entitled the "Filthy Fifteen" to demonstrate the dangers of such material to youth, with "We're Not Gonna Take It" featuring on the list alongside Prince's "Darling Nikki", Madonna's "Dress You Up", and Venom's "Possessed", among other titles. The PMRC proposed a system involving letters that identified the types of objectionable content they determined to be found in each album (e.g., "O" for occult themes, "X" for sex and profanity, "D/A" for drugs and alcohol, "V" for violence, etc.). Snider, John Denver, and Frank Zappa all testified against censorship and the proposed warning system. The system was never implemented, and the music industry had already adopted what is now the generic "Parental Advisory: Explicit Content" label. The PMRC involved prominent public figures such as Tipper Gore, the then-wife of Senator Al Gore (D-TN), and Susan Baker, the wife of then-Secretary of State James Baker. Tipper Gore and Snider had a publicly antagonistic relationship as a consequence, with Snider accusing her of having a "dirty mind" for alleging that the lyrics of "Under the Blade" contained sadomasochistic undertones, when in fact, they were about medical surgery. Snider also alleged during the Senate hearing that Tipper Gore had fabricated evidence concerning merchandise sold by the band when she stated that "the t-shirts that kids wear" featured "Twisted Sister and a woman in handcuffs sort of spread-eagled". Snider challenged her to produce such a shirt, to which Al Gore clarified that "the word 't-shirts' was in plural, and one of them referred to Twisted Sister and the other referred to a woman in handcuffs".

==== Come Out and Play (1985) ====
In November of 1985, Twisted Sister released Come Out and Play, which sold more than 500,000 copies in the USA. Snider continued as lead singer and primary songwriter.

By this point, he had said he was no longer "hungry": the success of Stay Hungry had brought wealth and fame (including multiple cars and boats), and he wrote the material while living a more comfortable life. The change in circumstances, he later reflected, affected the album's tone compared with earlier, more desperate work.

==== Love Is for Suckers (1987) and breakup ====
The fifth Twisted Sister album was Love Is for Suckers (1987). The record was originally planned to have been a Snider solo effort, but Atlantic Records encouraged a release under the Twisted Sister name. Touring lasted only into October 1987.

Internal band tensions, commercial decline, and the forced continuation of group activity contributed to the end of the original run. On October 12, 1987, Snider announced his departure from the group. By this time, his family had grown and Snider's focus was shifting towards other projects while still navigating the personal fallout from the band's turbulent peak years.

==== Reunions ====
Twisted Sister reunited for occasional appearances beginning in the late 1990's and more substantially from 2003 onward, with Snider returning as lead vocalist. After more than a decade apart, Twisted Sister's first post-breakup activity came in 1998, when the classic-era members (including Snider) reunited in the studio to record the new track "Heroes Are Hard to Find" for the soundtrack of Snider's horror film Strangeland. Occasional one-off appearances followed. By then he and Suzette had four children (Jesse, Shane, Cody, and Cheyenne) and had worked through earlier marital difficulties.

The group's first major live reunion in 14 years occurred in November 2001 at the New York Steel benefit concert, organized to support families of victims of the September 11 attacks; the event helped rekindle communication among the New York-based members.

A more sustained reunion began in 2003, with performances at major European festivals including Sweden Rock and Wacken Open Air (the latter filmed and released as Live at Wacken: The Reunion). From 2003 through 2016, the band toured regularly, focusing on selective high-profile shows and festivals rather than traditional lengthy package tours, and enjoyed strong demand especially in Europe. During this period, Snider balanced his radio work and other projects while remaining married to Suzette, who continued to influence the visual and costuming side of his career.

==== Still Hungry (2004) ====
Snider provided lead vocals on this re-recorded version of the 1984 classic Stay Hungry, released to mark the album’s 20th anniversary. The project reflected a more mature, reconciled phase of the band and Snider's life after the original breakup and his subsequent solo and media work.

==== A Twisted Christmas (2006) ====
Snider again handled lead vocals (and some backing vocals) on the band's holiday album A Twisted Christmas.

Snider announced his retirement from Twisted Sister in February 2026, citing health issues, but reiterated that his health is not dire.

=== Desperado ===
After his departure from Twisted Sister, Snider formed Desperado, a band featuring ex-Iron Maiden drummer Clive Burr, ex-Gillan guitarist Bernie Torme, and bassist Marc Russel. The group's only album, Ace, has never been officially released, but was heavily bootlegged on CD under the title Bloodied, but Unbowed.

=== Widowmaker ===
In the 1990s, Snider formed Widowmaker with guitarist Al Pitrelli, bassist Marc Russel, and former Twisted Sister drummer Joey Franco. The quartet recorded two albums with limited underground success, titled Blood and Bullets and Stand By for Pain. In the late 1990s, Snider toured with a "self-tribute" band called Dee Snider's SMFs (Sick Mutha Fuckers), sometimes featuring ex-Twisted Sister drummer A.J. Pero. The usual lineup included Snider, Derek Tailer, Charlie Mills, Keith Alexander, and Spike.

=== Solo career ===
In 1993, Snider composed the theme song for The Terrible Thunderlizards. By 1994, Snider had, by his own admission: "lost every penny I made. I was riding a bicycle to a desk job for $200 a week answering phones in an office." (equivalent to $434 in 2025)

In 1998, Snider penned a song entitled "The Magic of Christmas Day (God Bless Us Everyone)", which Celine Dion recorded for her album These Are Special Times. According to Snider, Dion at the time was not aware of who wrote the song. Later that year, he also wrote and starred in the horror film Strangeland. Snider penned a script for a sequel, but he was less than optimistic about it being developed.

In 2003, Snider collaborated on a Halloween-themed project called Van Helsing's Curse. The project's first album, Oculus Infernum, was released by Koch Records and featured a blend of heavy metal and orchestral elements in the style of Trans-Siberian Orchestra. The band began touring in 2004 and later released a DVD of the concert entitled Live in Philly '05.

On October 8, 2010, Snider started an 11-week run in the cast of Rock of Ages as Dennis, the owner of The Bourbon Room, with his official start date being October 11. That same year, Snider guest starred in the music video for "Immaculate Misconception" by the metalcore band Motionless in White. Snider's son Cody directed the video.

In 2011, Snider performed with Ohio-based metalcore band Attack Attack! on stage at the Bamboozle Festival playing their song "Turbo Swag".

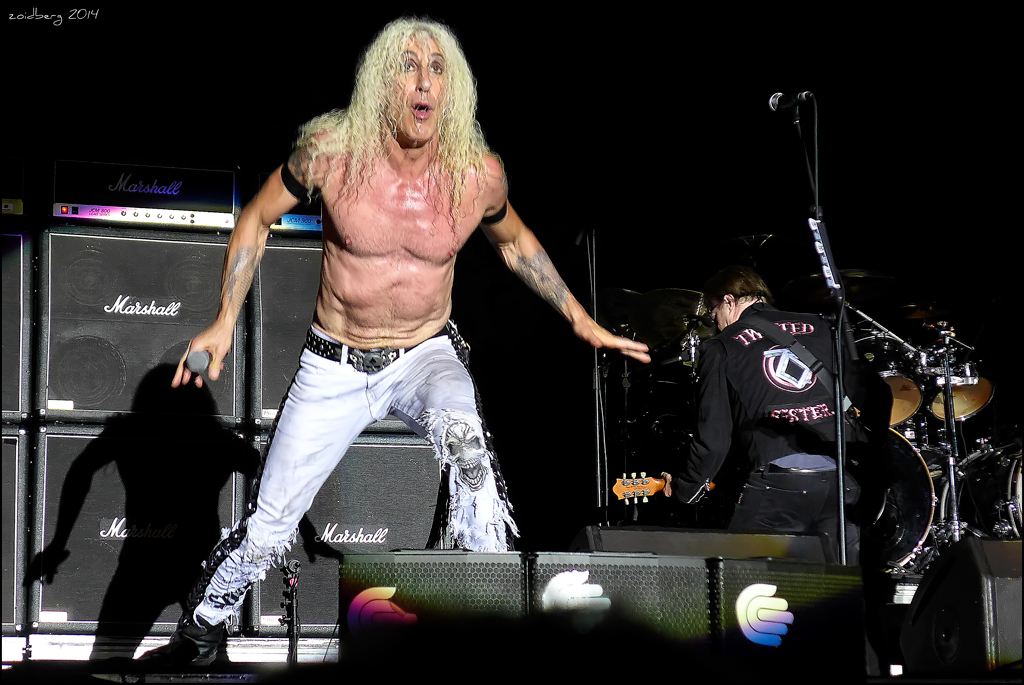
Snider in 2014

On November 4, 2014, Snider debuted his original Christmas musical, Dee Snider's Rock and Roll Christmas Tale, at the Broadway Playhouse in Chicago. During the 2015 Christmas season, he took the musical to Toronto.

In September 2020, Snider was a vocalist as the father on Ayreon's Transitus album.

On May 27, 2021, Snider announced his new upcoming solo album Leave a Scar. He also released the single "I Gotta Rock (Again)" which he described as the "driving motivation" and "starting gun for this album". Leave a Scar will be produced by Jamey Jasta, the lead singer of the band Hatebreed, with mixing and mastering done by Nick Bellmore. The album features guest appearances by Cannibal Corpse's singer Corpsegrinder on the track "Time to Choose". Music videos were released for the songs "I Gotta Rock (Again)", "Down But Never Out", and "Time to Choose". The album was released on July 30, 2021.

== Television career ==
During the mid-1980s, before the premiere of Headbangers Ball, the first MTV program to consist entirely of heavy metal videos was Heavy Metal Mania. The first episode aired in June 1985 and was hosted by Dee Snider. It featured metal news, interviews with metal artists, and in-studio co-hosts.

Snider has narrated and hosted many shows and specials on VH1, film trailers, behind-the-scenes segments, and DVD special features. He was featured as the "voice" in the bumpers for MSNBC's 2001/2002 "Fiercely Independent" branding campaign.

Snider hosted VH1's 2008 "Aftermath" concert in remembrance of the victims and survivors of the 2003 Station nightclub fire. During the winter of 2008, Snider was featured as a contestant on CMT's Gone Country. The show invited musical celebrities to compete against each other to win the chance to release a country song. In 2008 Snider also appeared on season 2 of Kitchen Nightmares, chosen by Gordon Ramsay as part of the marketing for the re-launch of the Handlebar restaurant. Snider donated a motorcycle on which Handlebar clientele could bid via the restaurant's website.

Snider voiced Angry Jack in the episode "Shell Shocked" for the Nickelodeon cartoon SpongeBob SquarePants. He admitted to being a massive fan of the show during an hour-long 10th anniversary documentary of the show in 2009, stating that to be asked to voice a character on the show was an absolute honor. He changed the lyrics of his famous "I Wanna Rock" to "Goofy Goober Rock" for The SpongeBob SquarePants Movie.

On July 27, 2010, Snider and his family began appearing in the reality television show Growing Up Twisted, airing on A&E.

On the May 15, 2011 episode of The Apprentice, Snider appeared to assist John Rich with his final challenge. Snider starred in a commercial featuring a mock audition where he came on as himself, and after drinking a soda, turns into the lead singer from Twisted Sister. Snider agreed to come because he is personally friends with Rich and wanted to support the charity effort for St. Jude Medical Center.

Snider and his family also appeared on Celebrity Wife Swap in 2012. His wife Suzette traded places with Flavor Flav's fiancée Liz.

On the Valentine's Day 2012 taping of Late Night with Jimmy Fallon, Snider partnered with Donald Trump in a skit based upon the format of the TV game show Password. On February 19, 2012, Snider began appearing as one of 18 contestants vying to become Trump's next Celebrity Apprentice and was fired after the eighth task during the seventh episode. That same year, Snider appeared as the main character of a commercial airing for the company Unibet. The video has been broadcast on commercial Norwegian television from March 5, 2012, through the whole summer. In the spot, Snider sings in his distinctive Twisted Sister look, a rock song called "Bet", written by Snider himself and composed by the Norwegian heavy metal artist Ronni Le Tekrø. On September 6, 2012, Snider performed "We're Not Gonna Take It" on America's Got Talent. Also in 2012, Snider played Larry, the owner of a dive bar in the mockumentary Future Folk about an alien bluegrass band.

On January 24, 2013, at the City National Grove of Anaheim, Snider was honored as roastee at the Revolver Magazine/Guitar World Rock and Roll Roast of Dee Snider.

Snider provided the narration for Attack of Life: The Bang Tango Movie, which is a documentary film directed by Drew Fortier about the 1980s hard rock band Bang Tango.

In 2023, Snider competed in season 9 of The Masked Singer as "Doll". After besting George Wendt as "Moose" and Christine Quinn of Selling Sunset as "Scorpio" on "'80s Night", he was eliminated on "WB Movie Night". Snider also did "We're Not Gonna Take It" as an encore.

== Radio career ==
Dee Snider developed a close friendship with radio personality Howard Stern beginning in the 1980s, bonding over shared Long Island roots, similar ages, and family-oriented lifestyles; he became a frequent guest on The Howard Stern Show. Stern encouraged Snider to pursue radio and voice-over work during a career low point, advice Snider has credited as pivotal to his later broadcasting success, including his syndicated House of Hair program. Their relationship temporarily soured in the early 2000s after Snider accepted a competing morning-drive radio job in the Hartford market (despite Stern’s initial blessing), leading to roughly five years of limited contact. The two reconciled on-air in February 2006, though Snider has noted that the friendship never fully regained its earlier closeness as their personal and professional paths diverged.

In 1997, Snider began hosting The House of Hair, a syndicated 1980s hard rock/heavy metal radio show on more than 200 radio stations across North America. The show's format runs two or three hours depending on which version of the show a radio station carries and features Snider's closing catchphrase "If it ain't metal, it's crap!"

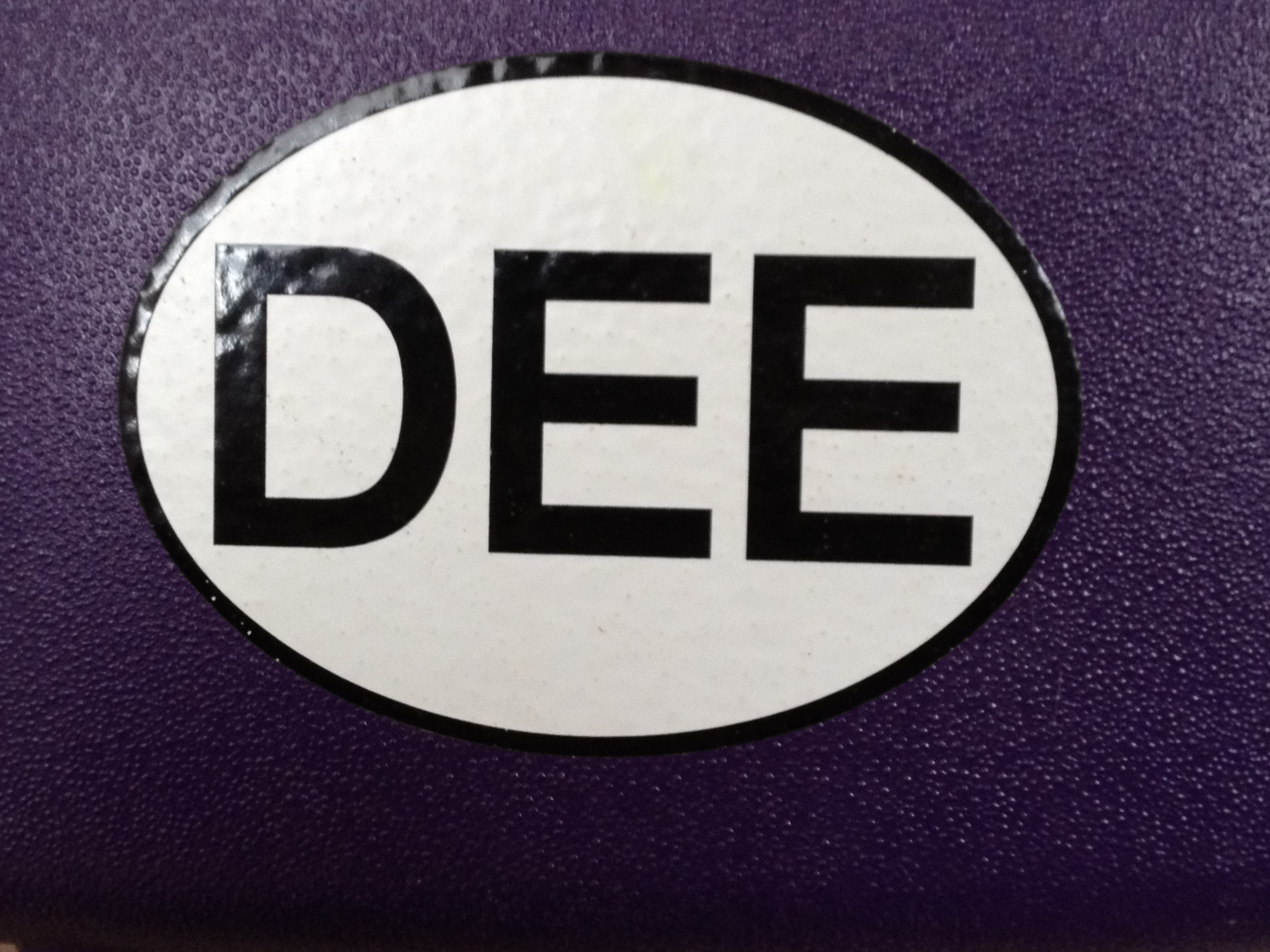
Radio 104 Dee Snider Euro Sticker

From June 1999 to August 2003, Snider hosted a morning radio show on a Hartford, Connecticut Clear Channel station, Radio 104 (104.1 FM WMRQ), called Dee Snider Radio. His show returned to the air at night in August 2004 on 93.3 WMMR in Philadelphia, Pennsylvania until June 2005. He fondly referred to his listeners as his "Peeps", and "DEE" euro stickers, printed by the station, could be seen on the bumpers of his fans' cars throughout Connecticut, New York, New Jersey, and Massachusetts. Other members of the morning show included Nick Lentino, Beth Lockwood, "Psycho Dan" Williams, Sean Robbins, and "Darkside Dave" Wallace. He frequently featured high-profile guests, including Ozzy Osbourne, pro wrestler Mick Foley, and Kiss singer/bassist Gene Simmons.

Snider returned to radio in June 2006 with Fangoria Radio on Sirius Satellite Radio channel 102 from 9–12 Eastern.

Snider has also hosted House of Hair, a radio show that plays heavy metal music. Snider has made appearances on the IFC Channel's original series Z Rock as himself playing the character of a "rock guru".

== Personal life ==
=== Family and relationships ===
Snider married costume designer Suzette Gargiulo in 1981. They have four children, including Jesse. As of 2025, Snider and his family live in Oak Ridge, North Carolina.

In 2003, Snider's brother-in-law Vincent Gargiulo was murdered. The killer was apprehended in 2009.

=== Health ===
Snider has maintained lifelong sobriety from recreational drugs and alcohol. He has stated that he experimented with alcohol only once, at age 14, becoming severely intoxicated and thereafter permanently abstaining. Bandmate Jay Jay French has confirmed that Twisted Sister enforced a strict no-drugs-and-alcohol policy and that Snider already adhered to it when he joined the group. Snider has attributed his sustained vocal power, physical stamina, and ability to perform high-energy shows into later decades in part to remaining clean. He has referred to himself as an "anti-rock star" in this respect.

In February 2026, Snider resigned from Twisted Sister, leading the band to cancel its planned 50th-anniversary reunion tour. In a statement, Snider explained that decades of high-energy performing had taken a severe toll, revealing that he suffers from degenerative arthritis (for which he has undergone multiple surgeries) that left him able to perform only a few songs at a time while in significant pain. He also disclosed that the physical demands of his career had affected his heart, along with related issues such as hypertension.

=== Legal issues ===
In 1984, Snider was arrested for obscenity in Amarillo, Texas. A parent who brought their kid to the Twisted Sister concert pressed charges after Snider cursed out a member of the audience for causing trouble. A fine was paid, and the charges were later dropped.

In 2021, Snider and Universal Music Group (which held the Twisted Sister publishing rights after purchasing them from Snider years earlier) won a major copyright infringement lawsuit against Australian politician Clive Palmer. Palmer had used an unauthorized parody of "We're Not Gonna Take It" (with altered lyrics such as "Australia ain't gonna cop it") in advertisements for his 2019 Senate campaign without securing a license. An Australian Federal Court ruled in Snider and Universal's favor, ordering Palmer to pay approximately $1.5 million AUD (about $1.2 million USD) in damages—the highest award for music copyright infringement in Australia at the time. Snider publicly celebrated the victory.

=== Politics ===
In 2003, he appeared with Arnold Schwarzenegger at campaign events during his drive to recall incumbent California Governor Gray Davis. Snider performed "We're Not Gonna Take It", which was adopted by the Schwarzenegger campaign.

In the run-up to the 2008 presidential election, Snider told TMZ that he would be voting for Democratic Party candidate Barack Obama over Republican Party candidate John McCain because McCain—whom he liked and supported for years—would not acknowledge the "mistakes" George W. Bush had made while in office. Regarding Donald Trump's victory in the 2024 presidential election, he said, "I'm disappointed that most of my countrymen, both men and women, can't see the big picture."

On July 11, 2013, after abortion rights activists sang "We're Not Gonna Take It" to protest legal restrictions on abortion in Texas, Snider tweeted that he is "pro-choice", and that he did not believe that being Christian and "pro-choice" were mutually exclusive.

In the wake of teachers' strikes in West Virginia and Oklahoma, Snider dedicated "We're Not Gonna Take It" to teachers during his Rocktopia performance at the Broadway Theatre in New York on April 9, 2018. The song had become an anthem for protesting teachers in West Virginia, Kentucky, Oklahoma, and elsewhere, and Snider had tweeted his "support [of the] underpaid teacher's cause" after seeing a video of music teachers in Oklahoma performing the song.

In 2021, Snider objected to the use of the song by anti-mask protestors in Fort Lauderdale, Florida. During the 2022 Russian invasion of Ukraine, he approved the use of the song by Ukrainians. He tweeted, "People are asking me why I endorsed the use of 'We're Not Gonna Take It' for the Ukrainian people and did not for the anti-maskers. Well, one use is for a righteous battle against oppression; the other is infantile feet stomping against an inconvenience."

In 2022, Snider tweeted about the use of the song by right-wing activists, "ATTENTION QANON, MAGAT FASCISTS: Every time you sing 'We're Not Gonna Take It' remember it was written by a cross-dressing, libtard, tree hugging half-Jew who HATES everything you stand for. It was you and people like you that inspired every angry word of that song! SO FUCK OFF!"

In November 2023, after the October 7 attacks, Snider was asked if he agreed with Israeli soldiers using "We're Not Gonna Take It" as a battle cry. He replied, "Oh, hell yeah. You know what? Israelis, the assault on the Israelis, people are losing sight of something. People saying that, 'Oh, the response is gonna be too intense for what happened.' Well, you don't get to decide on the response when you do heinous things to civilians. You don't get to say, 'Oh, that's enough, that's enough retaliation.' No, it doesn't work like that. When you cross that line, you're burning people, you're slaughtering people, you're raping people, you're just killing people, after what happened at that festival you don't get to say, 'Okay, your revenge can be this much.' No. Payback's a mothereffer. And I come from that school. You cross that line, you know... shit's gonna happen. Sing it out, boys."

=== Religion ===
Snider was raised in a Christian household. His father was born Jewish but abandoned the faith, while his mother was raised Catholic (of Swiss descent) and was excommunicated after marrying outside the Catholic Church. The family was welcomed by Protestants, and Snider and his siblings were raised as Episcopalians. He was baptized and confirmed as a Christian and sang in the church choir until the age of 19.

During the 1985 Parents Music Resource Center Senate hearings, Snider stated, "I was born and raised a Christian, and I still adhere to those principles." In later interviews he has described continuing to value Christian moral teachings while viewing Jesus more as a philosophical and ethical figure comparable to Martin Luther King Jr. or Gandhi, rather than the literal Son of God. He has expressed skepticism toward organized religion and a strictly judgmental deity, at times characterizing his outlook as closer to agnosticism, while still identifying with the Christian values of his upbringing.

== Discography ==
=== Twisted Sister ===
- Under the Blade (1982)
- You Can't Stop Rock 'n' Roll (1983)
- Stay Hungry (1984)
- Come Out and Play (1985)
- Love Is for Suckers (1987)
- Still Hungry (2004)
- A Twisted Christmas (2006)

=== Solo ===
- Never Let the Bastards Wear You Down (2000)
- Dee Does Broadway (2012)
- We Are the Ones (2016)
- For the Love of Metal (2018)
- Leave a Scar (2021)

=== Guest appearances ===
- Humanary Stew: A Tribute to Alice Cooper (1999)
- Welcome to My Nightmare: An All-Star Salute to Alice Cooper (1999)
- Bat Head Soup: A Tribute to Ozzy (2000)
- Spin The Bottle: An All-Star Tribute to Kiss (2004)
- Eddie Ojeda's Axes 2 Axes (2005)
- Numbers From The Beast: An All Star Tribute to Iron Maiden (2005)
- Lordi: The Arockalypse (2006)
- Harder & Heavier-60's British Invasion Goes Metal (2010)
- Sin-Atra (2011)
- Ghostlights (2016)
- XXX: 30 Years in Metal (2016)
- True Rockers (2018)
- Old Lions Still Roar (2019)
- Transitus (2020)
- Temple of Blues - Influences and Friends (2024)
- Remixed to Hell: A Tribute to AC/DC

=== Soundtracks ===
- "Inconclusion" from Strangeland soundtrack (1998)

== In media ==
=== Filmography ===
Year	Title	Role	Notes	Ref.
1985	Pee-wee's Big Adventure	Himself	Cameo, filming a video for "Burn in Hell"	
1997	Private Parts	Himself	Cameo	
1998	Strangeland	Carlton Hendricks / Captain Howdy	Also writer	
2002	Warning: Parental Advisory	Himself	Also wrote himself	
2004	Kiss Loves You	Himself	Documentary	
2005	Metal: A Headbanger's Journey	Himself	Documentary	
2011	Ronal the Barbarian	Lord Volcazar	Voiceover	
2018	The Last Sharknado: It's About Time	Sheriff		

=== Television ===
Year	Title	Role	Notes	Ref.
1998	The Upright Citizens Brigade		Episode "Saigon Suicide Show"	
2002-2004	VH1: I Love...	Himself		
2003	Chappelle's Show		Episode 6, season 1; part of the "Ask a Gay Dude - with Mario Cantone" skit	
2008	Kitchen Nightmares	Himself	Episode "Handlebar"	
2008	Z Rock		Episode 7, season 1	
2009	SpongeBob SquarePants	Angry Jack	Voiceover; episode "Shell Shocked"	
2010	America's Got Talent	Himself	Performed "I Wanna Rock"	
2011, 2012, 2013	Celebrity Apprentice	Himself	Contestant on 3 seasons	
2011	Street Monkeys	Narrator	Voiceover for SNI/SI Networks L.L.C.	
2011	Secret Mountain Fort Awesome	Tooth Fairy	Voiceover	
2012-2018	Holliston	Lance Rocket		
2012	The History of Future Folk			
2012	Motorcity	The Duke of Detroit	Voiceover	
2012-2013	Killer Karaoke	Narrator	Voiceover	
2013	Rock and Roll Roast of Dee Snider	Himself		
2014	The '80s Called	Himself	RadioShack television commercial	
2016-2017	Counting Cars	Himself	Appeared in 3 episodes	
2018-present	Top Ten Revealed			
2021	Cobra Kai	Himself	Performed "I Wanna Rock"	
2021	Celebrity Family Feud	Himself	Episode 3, season 8	
2023	The Masked Singer	Himself	Season 9 contestant	
2018-present	Metal Family			
2024	Ridiculousness	Himself	Episode 1, season 41	

=== Video games ===
Year	Title	Role	Notes	Ref.
2001	Jak and Daxter: The Precursor Legacy	Gol Acheron	Voiceover	

=== Radio appearances ===
- "Howard Stern" on Sirius, February 8, 2006; 2007
- Penn Radio (October 19, 2006) – interviewed by Penn Jillette

=== Bibliography ===
- Dee Snider's Teenage Survival Guide with Philip Bashe, 1987, Dolphin/Doubleday
- Shut Up and Give Me the Mic: a twisted memoir, 2012, Gallery Books
- We're Not Gonna Take It: A Children's Picture Book, 2020, Akashic Books
- Dee Snider: He's Not Gonna Take It with Frank Marraffino and Steve Kurth, 2023, Z2 Comics
