= Desperado (band) =

American rock band (1988–1990)

- Origin: United States
- Genres: Hard rock, heavy metal
- Years active: 1988–1990
- Labels: Destroyer, Deadline
- Past members: Dee Snider; Bernie Tormé; Marc Russell; Clive Burr

Desperado was an American hard rock band formed by Dee Snider in 1988 after Twisted Sister was disbanded. The band dissolved in the early 1990s due to problems with the record label after they shelved the album before the release date in 1990. The album, much bootlegged, was issued officially some years later and reissued as Ace on Angel Air, featuring eleven of the thirteen tracks from the initial reissue of the album under the alternate title Bloodied But Unbowed.

Dee Snider Desperado Limited Edition was released by Deadline Records on April 21, 2009.

== Past members ==
- Dee Snider – vocals (1988–1990)
- Bernie Tormé – guitars (1988–1990)
- Marc Russell – bass (1988–1990)
- Clive Burr – drums (1988–1990)

== Discography ==
- Bloodied But Unbowed (1996)
- Ace (2006)
- Dee Snider Desperado Limited Edition (2009)
