= We're Not Gonna Take It (Twisted Sister song) =

1984 single by Twisted Sister

Single by Twisted Sister

from the album Stay Hungry
- B-side: "You Can't Stop Rock & Roll"
- Released: May 1984
- Recorded: February–March 1984
- Genre: Glam metal; heavy metal; pop metal
- Length: 3:38
- Label: Atlantic
- Songwriter: Dee Snider
- Producer: Tom Werman

Twisted Sister singles chronology
"You Can't Stop Rock 'n' Roll" (1983)	"We're Not Gonna Take It" (1984)	"I Wanna Rock" (1984)

"We're Not Gonna Take It" is a song by American heavy metal band Twisted Sister from their album Stay Hungry. It was first released as a single (with "You Can't Stop Rock & Roll" as the B-side) in May 1984.

The single reached No. 21 on the Billboard Hot 100 singles chart, making it Twisted Sister's only Top 40 single. It is the band's highest-selling single in the United States, having been certified Gold on June 3, 2009, for sales of over 500,000 units. The song was ranked No. 47 on 100 Greatest 80's Songs and No. 21 on VH1's 100 Greatest One Hit Wonders of the 80s.

In 1985, it received criticism when the Parents Music Resource Center included the song on its "Filthy Fifteen" list for alleged violent lyrical content, allegations that were repudiated by lead singer Dee Snider.

== Background ==
"We're Not Gonna Take It" was written by vocalist Dee Snider. As influences for the song, he cites the glam rock band Slade and the Christmas carol "O Come, All Ye Faithful". The end of the song uses lines from character Douglas C. Niedermeyer in the film Animal House (e.g., "You're all worthless and weak!"). Mark Metcalf, who played Niedermeyer, stars in the video.

== Reception ==
Cash Box said the song has "glaring lead vocals", "sneering lyrics", "heavy metal skill and...a refreshing dose of humor".

== Music video ==
The music video was directed by Marty Callner. It begins with a disobedient boy (played by Callner's son) playing Twisted Sister songs in his bedroom while the rest of the family is eating dinner. The boy's strict father, "Douglas C." (a reference to Mark Metcalf's character in Animal House), enters his room and berates him for only being interested in rock music. He demands to know what the son intends to do with his life, to which the son, in Dee Snider's voice, declares, "I wanna rock!" He strums his guitar and the sound blasts the father out of a nearby window. The boy transforms into Snider, and the song begins. Snider sings to the other children at the dinner table, who turn into the rest of the band, and they wreak havoc on the family. The father gets the worst of the band’s mischief, with footage of his continual punishments interspersed with footage of the band performing. The music video was distributed to movie theaters by Music Motions.

== Covers ==
The song has been covered by various artists. German pop punk band Donots released a cover in 2002 which went Top 40 in Germany, reaching 33 in the Singles Chart. A cover version by Bif Naked was used in the film Ready to Rumble, which became David Arquette's entrance theme while he appeared on WCW programming. Another cover version by Veilröth was used for the ending credits of the game Wolfenstein II: The New Colossus.

=== Ballad ===
In 2016, Dee Snider gave magician Criss Angel the rights to use the song as an "anthem" for his HELP (Heal Every Life Possible) charity. "Dee and I have known each other since the 1990s and he was a strong proponent of mine for years. We are both from Long Island, or as we like to think of it, 'Strong Island,' and his record publishing company gave me the rights to the song and it is our anthem for gratis." Snider appeared in a video of a stripped down acoustic version for the charity, recorded in the desert outside Las Vegas and featuring children in hospital and a young woman shaving her head to symbolize fighting cancer.

== Legacy ==
VH-1's series True Spin explains the song as simply an anthem of teen rebellion, but Snider appeared saying that he was happy that long after he is gone, "any time that the team is down by two, or somebody had a bad day at the office, they're gonna stand up and sing We're Not Gonna Take It". In March 2023, Rolling Stone ranked the song at number 81 on their "100 Greatest Heavy Metal Songs of All Time" list. In 2015, "Sleazegrinder" of Louder included the song in his list of "The 20 Greatest Hair Metal Anthems Of All Time", placing it tenth.

=== Parodies ===
- American singer "Weird Al" Yankovic included a version of the song in his "Hooked on Polkas" medley from Dare to Be Stupid.
- American ska punk band Reel Big Fish used the melody to the song as part of their song "Everybody's Drunk" with lyrics altered to be: "We're all gonna get drunk! We're all gonna get drunk! Oh wait we're already drunk!"
- In 1999, the US rock band Lit parodied the opening scene in their video for "Zip-Lock".
- The song is popularly known as "Huevos con aceite... ¡Y limón!" ("Eggs with oil... And lemon!") in Spanish-speaking countries. Twisted Sister has sung it as "Huevos con Aceite" when giving concerts in Spanish-speaking regions. In a Primavera commercial in Mexico, there was a parody named "Huevos con Aceite" with the lyrics: Huevos como siempre, oh no, ya no queremos, ahora con Primavera, desayunarán (Eggs as always, no. We don't want them. Now with Primavera butter, you'll take your breakfast).
- ApologetiX, an American Christian parody band, released the song "We're Not Going To Canaan" on their 2014 release Loaded 45's.
- Spanish heavy metal band Gigatrón released a version of this song with different Spanish lyrics titled "Heavy hasta la muerte", as a parody of being a true metal fan.

=== In politics ===
In 2012, Republican Vice-Presidential nominee Paul Ryan's campaign used the song in Mitt Romney's presidential campaign, until Snider asked Ryan not to play it anymore. Snider said that he did not support Ryan, and that he planned on voting for Obama.

In the summer of 2015, the song was adopted as the theme song for Donald Trump's 2016 presidential campaign. The song was played after all his campaign appearances where it was known unofficially as the Trump fight song. Newsweek reported Snider gave Trump permission to use the song. Snider later changed his mind, saying that he had only allowed Trump to use the song because the two were friends, but then respectfully asked Trump to stop using it as he did not agree with many of Trump's stances. Snider did not want people to get the impression that he was endorsing Trump or his campaign.

During the 2018 teachers' strikes in the United States, the song was used as a rallying cry by teachers striking in Oklahoma and Arizona.

In Australia, Clive Palmer altered the lyrics to "Australia ain't gonna cop it" in a national TV campaign for United Australia Party ahead of the 2019 election. Twisted Sister condemned the unauthorized use of the song. Palmer disputed Twisted Sister's claim that they have any copyright over the portion of the song used in the advertisements, as he composed the lyrics and the melody was derived from "O Come, All Ye Faithful". In April 2021, Palmer was ordered by the Federal Court of Australia to pay $1.5 million in damages for copyright infringement. Palmer was also ordered to pay legal costs and to remove all copies of the song and accompanying videos off the internet.

On August 26, 2022, in response to use of the song by far-right activists, Snider tweeted: "ATTENTION QANON, MAGAT FASCISTS: Every time you sing 'We're Not Gonna Take It' remember it was written by a cross-dressing, libtard, tree hugging half-Jew who HATES everything you stand for. It was you and people like you that inspired every angry word of that song! SO F**K OFF!"

=== In advertising ===
In 1985, the non-profit organisation United Way used snippets of the song and its music video to promote a program entitled "Changing the American Family". This was used as evidence during Snider's Senate hearing to indicate that the song was not violent or obscene, since United Way used "the video's introduction with the demanding father" as a "light-hearted way of talking about communication with teenagers".

=== Other uses ===
In the wake of the 2011 Great East Japan Earthquake, supporters of association football J.League club Vegalta Sendai used the song melody for a chant to support the team, in which a video from November 2008 of fans at an away game against Yokohama FC cheering, was highlighted on Twisted Sister's website.

The song was used by Ukrainians protesting the 2022 invasion of Ukraine by Russia, with Snider's approval.

In November 2023, when asked after the October 7 attacks whether he was okay with Israeli soldiers using his band's "We're Not Gonna Take It" as a battle cry, Snider replied:

Oh, hell yeah. You know what? Israelis, the assault on the Israelis, people are losing sight of something. People saying that, "Oh, the response is gonna be too intense for what happened". Well, you don't get to decide on the response when you do heinous things to civilians. You don't get to say, "Oh, that's enough, that's enough retaliation". No, it doesn't work like that. When you cross that line, you're burning people, you're slaughtering people, you're raping people, you're just killing people, after what happened at that festival you don't get to say, "Okay, your revenge can be this much". No. Payback's a mothereffer. And I come from that school. You cross that line, you know... Shit's gonna happen. Sing it out, boys.

== Personnel ==
- Dee Snider – lead vocals
- Eddie "Fingers" Ojeda – lead guitar, backing vocals
- Jay Jay French – rhythm guitar, backing vocals
- Mark "The Animal" Mendoza – bass, backing vocals
- A. J. Pero – drums, percussion

== Charts ==
=== Weekly charts ===
Chart (1984)	Peak position
Australia (Kent Music Report)	6
Canada Top Singles (RPM)	6
New Zealand (Recorded Music NZ)	2
Sweden (Sverigetopplistan)	10
UK Singles (Official Charts)	58
US Billboard Hot 100	21
US Mainstream Rock (Billboard)	7

=== Year-end charts ===
Chart (1984)	Position
Australia (Kent Music Report)	49
Canada Top Singles (RPM)	43

== Certifications ==
Region	Certification	Certified units/sales
Canada (Music Canada)	8× Platinum	800,000^{^}
Sweden (GLF)	Gold	25,000^{^}
Spain (Promusicae)	Gold	30,000^{‡}
United Kingdom (BPI)	Silver	200,000^{‡}
United States (RIAA)	Gold	500,000^{^}
^{^} Shipments figures based on certification alone.^{‡} Sales+streaming figures based on certification alone.
