= The Ultimate Collection (Solution album) =

Compilation album by Solution
- Released: 2005
- Recorded: 1971–1983
- Genre: Progressive rock, symphonic rock
- Label: Hunter Music

Solution chronology
Solution Live (1983)	The Ultimate Collection (2005)	Collections (2006)

The Ultimate Collection is a three-CD compilation of music by the Dutch symphonic rock band Solution. The first in-depth retrospective of the group, it was released by Universal and Hunter Entertainment in 2005. The sound is digitally remastered.

== Contents ==
The first two discs feature studio recordings and the third comprises the entirety of their 1983 album Solution Live. Every song from their debut album Solution is included on the first CD, and five of the six from the follow-up Divergence. The track "Fever" was omitted from previous CD editions of Solution/Divergence and makes its first digital appearance at the end of the live disc.

The Ultimate Collection features one version of every song Solution released, meaning that the studio recordings of tracks performed on Solution Live are not included. The rest of the set takes in three tracks from third album Cordon Bleu, and four each from Fully Interlocking, ...It's Only Just Begun... and Runaway.

The 1975 song "Third Line" is split into two parts to end the first disc and begin the second. On Cordon Bleu they segue into each other and are virtually indistinguishable.

== Packaging ==
The three discs are housed in a fold-out Digipak case with a biographical booklet. The photograph of the band on the front cover itself is from the vinyl edition of the Divergence LP.

== Track listing ==
=== CD 1 ===
1. "Koan"
2. "Preview"
3. "Phases"
4. "Trane Steps"
5. "Circus Circumstances"
  - The album Solution.
6. "Second Line"
7. "Concentration"
8. "Theme"
9. "New Dimension"
  - From Divergence.
10. "Whirligig"
11. "Third Line (Part 1)"
  - From Cordon Bleu.

=== CD 2 ===
1. "Third Line (Part 2)"
  - From Cordon Bleu.
2. "Carousel"
3. "Sonic Sea"
4. "Free Inside"
5. "French Melodie"
  - From Fully Interlocking.
6. "On My Own"
7. "Mirror"
8. "Logic"
9. "It Happened In September"
  - From ...It's Only Just Begun...
10. "Shame On You"
11. "Evil Love"
12. "Who's to Blame"
13. "Lovin' You Was Easy"
  - From Runaway.

=== CD 3 ===
1. "Move On"
2. "Downhearted"
3. "Black Pearl"
4. "Song for You"
5. "Give Some More"
6. "Last Detail"
7. "It's Only Just Begun"
8. "Divergence"
9. "Bad Breaks"
10. "Captain Willie"
11. "Runaway"
12. "100 Words"
13. "Chapaqua" (sic)
14. "Empty Faces"
  - The album Solution Live.
15. "Fever"
  - From Divergence.
