= Sol Studios =

Recording studio in Berkshire, England

Coordinates: 51.5571°N 0.6998°W

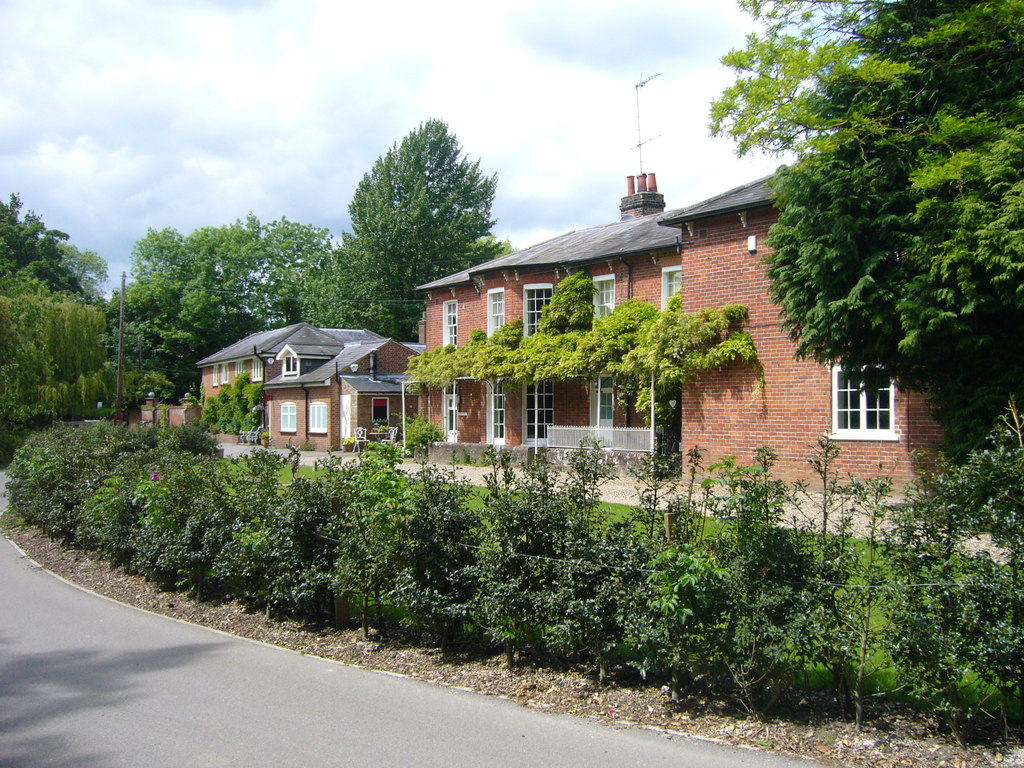
The Sol Mill house in 2009

Sol Studios (also known as The Mill or The Sol) is a recording studio located in Cookham, Berkshire, England. The recording studio and control room are part of the complex property, along an old watermill and residential wheelhouse in the countryside. The property was bought in 1974 by Gus Dudgeon, and the recording studio was built in the following year. Gus ran the studio as his own production facility until running into financial trouble when the studio was sold to Led Zeppelin's Jimmy Page. Page decided to revert to the old name of "The Sol".

HSH Music, a partnership of Rod Halling, Roy Shipston and Simon Holmes, purchased the studio from Page in 1988. They redeveloped it over the next two years into a commercial three-studio complex, utilising a quadruple garage on the site as Studio 2 and part of the old Mill Wheel housing as Studio 3. Chris Rea liked Studio 2 so much that he decided to block book it for a year at a time.

In February 1994, HSH Music sold the site as a "residential" property. The new owners, however, failed to grasp that the building was built like a nuclear shelter and not really suitable for conversion. They subsequently sold it to Chris Rea, who owned it until 2006.

== Artists ==
In 1977, the first music artist to record in the studio was the Dutch band Solution with Fully Interlocking (produced by Dudgeon) and mixed their next album ...It's Only Just Begun... there. That same year the single "Almost Gone" by Barry Mann and Cynthia Weil was recorded followed in 1978 with one song by Larry Smith, Back and Fourth by Lindisfarne, Elton John's album A Single Man including some unreleased tracks, as well the Chris Rea's debut album Whatever Happened to Benny Santini? with the 1979 follow-up Deltics. Also in 1979-80 Shooting Star's self-titled debut album, and two Voyager albums Halfway Hotel (1979) and Act of Love (1980).

In 1980, the Irish band The Boomtown Rats, as well Mary Wilson, recorded several unreleased tracks, Elkie Brooks her best-selling album Pearls, Gilbert O'Sullivan album Off Centre. In 1981 Mick Fleetwood mixed his solo album The Visitor, and Bill Wyman his soundtrack Green Ice and single "Je suis un rock star". In 1982 the band Vandenberg recorded their eponymous debut album, Wishbone Ash their album Twin Barrels Burning, and Twisted Sister their 1983 major label debut You Can't Stop Rock 'n' Roll.

The Led Zeppelin songs "Poor Tom" and "We're Gonna Groove", which were originally recorded in 1970, were produced by Page at Sol Studios for release on the 1982 album Coda. Page also recorded the soundtrack for the film Death Wish II at the studios. Page's band The Firm recorded its self-titled debut album there in 1984, the album being released the following year. The Firm's subsequent album, Mean Business, was also recorded at Sol Studios, as was Page's 1988 solo album, Outrider.

Elton John recorded Ice on Fire in 1985, as well his subsequent album Leather Jackets released in 1986. In 1989, Jeff Beck recorded and rehearsed the album Jeff Beck's Guitar Shop, for which he received a Grammy award. Since 1989 or very early 1990s, the studio was in the property of Chris Rea until 2006, and there he co-recorded many of his songs and albums until 2006. In 2006 a Bonhams auction sold the Yamaha C7 piano which was used for The Road to Hell, The Blue Cafe, Stony Road, La Passione and Blue Guitars.

The grand piano at The Sol was a special Bechstein E series that was originally reserved by Bechstein for performance and solo recital sales (Tonenspielen), and was eventually purchased for use at the studio.

Stuart Epps, producer, engineer and studio manager worked at the studio from 1974 with Gus Dudgeon, and then for Jimmy Page and Chris Rea.
