= Come Back Suzanne =

1982 single by Bill Wyman

Single by Bill Wyman

from the album Bill Wyman
- B-side: "Seventeen"
- Released: March 1982
- Recorded: 1980
- Studio: Sol (Cookham, Berkshire)
- Genre: New wave; synth-pop
- Length: 3:23
- Label: A&M
- Songwriter: Bill Wyman
- Producers: Chris Kimsey; Bill Wyman

Bill Wyman singles chronology
"(Si Si) Je Suis un Rock Star" (1981)	"Come Back Suzanne" (1982)	"A New Fashion" (1982)

Music video
- "Come Back Suzanne" on YouTube

"Come Back Suzanne" is a song by the English rock musician Bill Wyman, released in March 1982 by A&M Records as a single from his eponymous third solo studio album. Wyman described it as "a little bit Stonesy. This one hasn't got any cockney French on it."

The song was written about Suzanne Accosta, whom would later become Wyman's third, and current wife.

== Critical reception ==
Donald Guarisco of AllMusic praised the song as one of the best on the album. He called it "a one-of-a-kind rock/disco/new wave hybrid that blends power chords with ethereal synth flourishes as Wyman delivers a tongue-in-cheek tale of lost love." Susan Molloy of The Sydney Morning Herald considered its lyrics to be among Wyman's best and placed it as an album highlight. Georgiy Starostin called "Come Back Suzanne" a "tongue-in-cheek disco parody (brilliant)."

== Personnel ==
- Bill Wyman – lead vocals, bass guitar, all other instruments, design
- Terry Taylor – guitar, backing vocals
- Dave Mattacks – drums
- Dave Lawson – synthesizer

== Charts ==
Chart (1982)	Peak position
Australia (Kent Music Report)	12
