= Bill Wyman (album) =

Studio album by Bill Wyman
- Released: 26 March 1982
- Recorded: 1982
- Studios: Sol (Cookham, Berkshire)
- Genres: New wave; synth-pop
- Length: 39:56
- Label: A&M
- Producers: Bill Wyman; Chris Kimsey

Bill Wyman chronology
Green Ice (1981)	Bill Wyman (1982)	Stuff (1992)

Singles from Bill Wyman
- 1. "(Si Si) Je Suis un Rock Star" Released: July 1981; 2. "Visions" Released: 1982; 3. "A New Fashion" Released: March 1982; 4. "Come Back Suzanne" Released: March 1982

Bill Wyman is the third solo studio album by the English rock musician Bill Wyman, released on 26 March 1982 by A&M Records. The album reached No. 55 on the UK Albums Chart.

Unlike his previous studio albums, Bill Wyman is largely in the new wave-style, with heavy use of synthesisers, and drum machines, and was his first studio album in six years following Stone Alone (1976), after feeling that his first two studio albums "weren't very good", and that a solo career was not for him, but that it was the only way that he would be able to release his own songs, when other artists were not interested in recording them.

The song "(Si Si) Je Suis un Rock Star" was the biggest hit single off the album, making the top 20 in five different countries, and "Come Back Suzanne" made No. 12 in Australia. The album features guest musicians Chris Rea, Brian Setzer and Slim Jim Phantom of Stray Cats, Dave Mattacks of Fairport Convention and Terry Taylor of Tucky Buzzard.

== Critical reception ==
Professional ratings
Review scores
Source	Rating
AllMusic	4/5 stars

In a retrospective review, AllMusic rated the album four stars out of five. They noted "(Si Si) Je Suis un Rock Star", "Come Back Suzanne" and "A New Fashion" as the best songs. They praised the album: "Instead of utilizing the all-star group of backup musicians that dominated his previous solo outings, Bill Wyman found the veteran rocker handling much of the instrumentation himself, with only a rhythm section and a few guest stars pitching in. The result is a crisp, consistent sound that mixes the electronic edge of new wave with good, old-fashioned rock & roll production values." The album is a "worthwhile listen" and concluded that "ultimately, one's level of interest in Bill Wyman will depend on their love of eccentric humor, but no one can deny that it effectively combines solid songwriting and a sleek, consistent production style."

== Track listing ==
All tracks are written by Bill Wyman, with additional writers noted.

Side one
No.	Title	Writer(s)	Length
1.	"Ride On Baby"	Stephen Wyman	3:53
2.	"A New Fashion"	Terry Taylor	4:08
3.	"Nuclear Reactions"		3:38
4.	"Visions"	Taylor	4:12
5.	"Jump Up"	Chris Kimsey	3:58

Side two
No.	Title	Length
6.	"Come Back Suzanne"	3:23
7.	"Rio de Janeiro"	4:17
8.	"Girls"	2:45
9.	"Seventeen"	3:45
10.	"(Si Si) Je Suis un Rock Star"	5:59
Total length:		39:56

Bonus Tracks
No.	Title	Length
11.	"Rio de Janeiro" (Single Edit)	3:47
12.	"Come Back Suzanne" (Single Edit)	2:53
13.	"Visions" (Single Edit)	2:58
14.	"(Si Si) Je Suis un Rock Star" (Single Edit)	3:21
15.	"Come Back Suzanne" (Demo)	5:55
16.	"(Si Si) Je Suis un Rock Star" (Demo)	4:06

== Personnel ==
- Bill Wyman – lead vocals, backing vocals, synthesizers, additional guitars, bass, harmonica
- Dave Lawson – synthesizers
- Terry Taylor – guitars, backing vocals
- Dave Mattacks – drums
- The Cookham Cookies – backing vocals
- Stuart Epps – backing vocals
- Chris Kimsey – backing vocals

with:

- Stephen Wyman – synthesizers (1)
- Brian Setzer – guitar (1)
- Chris Rea – guitar (4)
- Bogdan Wiczling – drums (6, 9)
- Slim Jim Phantom – drums (7)
- Bruce Rowland – drums (10)
- Mel Collins – horns (5)
- Annie Whitehead – horns (5)
- Martin Drover – horns (5)

=== Production ===
- Bill Wyman – producer, cover concept, photography
- Chris Kimsey – co-producer, engineer, mixing (1–5, 7–10), mastering
- Stuart Epps – engineer, mixing (6)
- Stewart Eales – assistant engineer
- Ted Jensen – mastering
- Sterling Sound (New York City, New York) – mastering location
- Michael Ross – art direction, design, cover concept
- Syd Brak – illustration
- Stephen Wyman – additional photography

== Charts ==
Chart (1982)	Peak position
Australia (Kent Music Report)	59
United Kingdom (Official Charts Company)	55
