= Green Ice =

- French poster
- Directed by: Ernest Day
- Screenplay by: Edward Anhalt; Ray Hassett; Anthony Simmons; Robert de Laurentis
- Based on: 1978 novel by Gerald A. Browne
- Produced by: Jack Wiener executive Lew Grade
- Starring: Ryan O'Neal; Omar Sharif; Anne Archer
- Cinematography: Gilbert Taylor
- Edited by: John Jympson
- Music by: Bill Wyman
- Production company: ITC Entertainment
- Distributed by: ITC Film Distributors Limited
- Release date: 21 May 1981 (UK)
- Running time: 117 minutes
- Country: United Kingdom
- Language: English
- Budget: $14 million or $10 million
- Box office: $4 million

Green Ice is a 1981 British adventure film starring Ryan O'Neal. It was also released under the name Operation Green Ice.

== Plot ==
While drifting through Mexico, American engineer Joe Wiley meets well-heeled woman Liliana Holbrook, who sets him up with a room in an expensive hotel. Wiley finds emeralds in his room and takes a mysterious phone call arranging a meeting the next morning. He travels to the meeting at a secluded beach, but is shot at and has to escape into the sea, where he is picked up by Holbrook in a speedboat. Later, at her home, Holbrook explains that her sister Carrie has disappeared while travelling in Colombia. They are visited by Argenti, who controls the emerald trade in Colombia and, Holbrook believes, will help find her sister. Argenti is a former diamond trader who was exiled for dealing in stolen diamonds. He wants to marry Holbrook, whose father is a wealthy diamond merchant, as a way to return to favour with his former organisation.

In Colombia Argenti shows Wiley his operation, including a voice activated vault in which he stores emeralds. Holbrook and Wiley set off into the interior to look for Carrie. They discover that she was killed by the army while helping rebels. They meet the rebels whose leader, Miguel, shows them that they are smuggling emeralds via a coffee plantation to raise funds for their cause. Holbrook agrees to help and they set off to return with a shipment of emeralds but are stopped by the same army patrol that killed her sister. When the patrol leader discovers Holbrook's identity he tries to shoot her, but she shoots first and kills him. The rebels kill the other soldiers. They travel further but are captured again and detained overnight, and it is implied that Holbrook is molested by the soldiers. The two are freed the following morning.

They meet with Miguel again and determine to rob the vault in the Argenti's skyscraper headquarters. With the help of Wiley's old friend Claude, he and Miguel use cloudhopper one-man hot air balloons to land on the roof of the skyscraper undetected. Wiley and Miguel enter the vault and use a covertly obtained recording of Argenti to open the vault and steal the contents. Wiley then descends to the street and the waiting rebels, but Miguel gets stuck part way down. Argenti's men realise a robbery is in progress and raise the alarm. Wiley escapes but, rather than be captured, Miguel releases himself from his harness and falls to his death.

Wiley and Holbrook make it to a rendezvous and escape on a boat, but run into a Colombian naval patrol and are boarded. The navy commander does not find the emeralds, but inadvertently releases them into the sea while destroying illegal fishing bait. Argenti and his men track Wiley and Holbrook to a secluded holiday home near Miami, where a violent confrontation ensues. Holbrook is wounded, and Wiley is cornered by Argenti, who is then killed by his associate Jaap, who is working for the diamond organisation that Argenti had previously been expelled from. Holbook recovers and Wiley then takes delivery of a shipment of coffee from Colombia, inside which is concealed a package of emeralds from the rebels' plantation.

== Cast ==
- Ryan O'Neal as Joseph Wiley
- Anne Archer as Lillian Holbrook
- Omar Sharif as Meno Argenti
- John Larroquette as Claude
- Michael Sheard as Jaap
- Philip Stone as Kellerman

== Production ==
=== Development ===
The film was based on a novel by Gerald Browne, best known for writing 11 Harrowhouse. Browne was fascinated by emeralds and spent extensive time in Colombia researching the book, which was published in 1978.

In July 1978 David Niven Jr, who had just made Escape to Athena, arrived in Hollywood to commence preproduction on the film adaptation. Browne had said that Richard Burton would star in the lead but Niven Jr said this was not true, and that there was not even a script.

In October 1978 ITC announced the film was part of a slate of movies that also included Raise the Titanic, The Lone Ranger, The Chinese Bandit, Eleanor Roosevelt's Niggers, The Golden Gate, The Gemini Contenders, Trans-Siberian Express, and The Scarletti Inheritance. Only Green Ice and the first two would be made.

The original director was Anthony Simmons, best known for Black Joy (1977) which had been backed by ITC. Simmons says he got the job on the back of the critical success of On Giant's Shoulders (1979). Simmons had said the original novel "was a huge book with about five different stories, any one of which would have been perfect action thriller, and the producers wanted to do the section set in Bolivia. It had all the hallmarks of disaster and I should never have touched it."

Simmons had said the budget was going to be £7 million and the writer was to be Troy Kennedy Martin. He said he worked on the script and the "set action pieces" for over a year and ITC "spent a million dollars looking for locations first in Spain, then in Mexico."

Anne Archer was cast on the back of her performance in Raise the Titanic. Simmons had said "Every artist for the part of the woman was turned down for being too "old", (she was meant to be in her early twenties) but it turned out Lew Grade had already contracted Anne Archer, a good actress in her mid thirties."

=== Shooting ===
The movie was set in Colombia but shot on location in Mexico as it was felt that country was safer. The unit was mostly based out of the town of Cuernavaca. The Edificio Banamex building located at Avenida Paseo de la Reforma 390 in Mexico City was used as Argenti's headquarters.

Simmons said a lot of the film "was shot in and around the hotel and a large chunk taken back to the studio in the UK" and the opening sequence was shot in the hotel gardens. He also says Ryan O'Neal "found he couldn’t work with" Anne Archer as "they both had very different ideas about what kind of film we were making. Then I was told either me or the producer had to go and they were going to get Franklin Schaffner to shoot it. So I left the production by ‘artistic disagreement’. I was paid 100 per cent of my fee but it took me a couple of years to live it down." Simmons left the project during filming and was replaced by Ernest Day, the second unit director.

The film was financed by Lew Grade who called it "quite a nice little film, but in the end, too much like a TV movie."

O'Neal almost drowned while filming a scene in the ocean in Las Hadas and he had to be rescued by stuntman Vic Armstrong.

Grade said he found O'Neal "charming and helpful" during the making of the movie. Sharif said he had "a nice secondary part, rather flash, with plenty of time off." The schedule was arranged so Sharif could periodically return to Europe to supervise his casinos.

Simmons says "We couldn’t go above a certain budget. But the rumour is that the film in the end cost nearly double its original budget. Anyway, it was an experience. It was my first time going into a Hollywood-style production and that kind of contract."

== Music ==
The soundtrack was recorded by Bill Wyman and released as the album Green Ice. The soundtrack contains 18 original songs.

== Reception ==
The Observer called it "a disaster".

In June 1981 it was the fifth most popular movie then in release at the British box office.

Anne Archer later got Ernest Day to direct a film she starred in and helped produce, Waltz Across Texas.

== See also ==
- High Risk (1981)
- Romancing the Stone (1984)
- Florida Straits (1986)
