= Death Wish II (album) =

Album by Jimmy Page

Death Wish II: The Original Soundtrack – Music by Jimmy Page

Soundtrack album by Jimmy Page
- Released: 15 February 1982
- Recorded: August – September 1981
- Studios: The Sol, Cookham.
- Genres: Blues-rock, instrumental rock
- Length: 37:11
- Label: Swan Song
- Producer: Jimmy Page

Jimmy Page chronology
Death Wish II: The Original Soundtrack – Music by Jimmy Page (1982)	Whatever Happened to Jugula? (1985)

Professional ratings
Review scores
Source	Rating
AllMusic	2.5/5 stars

Death Wish II: The Original Soundtrack – Music by Jimmy Page is a soundtrack album by Jimmy Page, released by Swan Song Records on 15 February 1982, to accompany the film Death Wish II.

== Overview ==
Following the XYZ project, Page was asked by his London neighbour, movie director Michael Winner, to record a soundtrack for the film Death Wish II in late August 1981. Page was given a deadline of a few weeks to write and record the album at his personal studio The Sol and to travel on location to Los Angeles with Winner for songwriting themes. Winner later explained:

I'd lived next door to Jimmy for many years. It was a very bad time for him – the drummer (John Bonham of Led Zeppelin) had died, and he was in a very inactive period. (Led Zeppelin manager) Peter Grant and I made arrangements for Jimmy to do the Death Wish II score, for which he wasn't actually paid, because Grant wanted to restore Jimmy back to creativity. Jimmy rang the doorbell, and I thought if the wind blew he'd fall over. He saw the film, we spotted where the music was to go, and then he said to me "I'm going to my studio. I don't want you anywhere near me, I'm going to do it all on my own." My editing staff said this is bloody dangerous! Anyway, we gave him the film, we gave him the timings, and he did it all on his own. Everything hit the button totally! I've never seen a more professional score in my life.

Death Wish II starred Charles Bronson, and was set around Los Angeles, which inspired Page to write a blues-flavoured soundtrack. The soundtrack features Dave Mattacks from Fairport Convention, former The Pretty Things keyboards player Gordon Edwards, and veteran singer Chris Farlowe, who also appeared on Page's 1988 solo album Outrider. Page used a Roland guitar synthesizer on a number of the tracks. Tracks from this album were reused by Winner for Death Wish III. Page was then asked by Winner to compose the soundtrack for Scream for Help (1985), but he declined and suggested John Paul Jones to the director instead.

This album is Page's only solo material to appear on Led Zeppelin's record label Swan Song Records. His two later albums with The Firm were released on Atlantic and Outrider was on Geffen Records. Swan Song ceased operations in 1983.

In Japan a vinyl LP was released that featured rare outtakes from the Sol sessions. Death Wish II was released in CD format in 1999, but all CD versions of the album are now out of print. Today used copies are highly collectible, and can sell for over a hundred dollars.

Even though the track "Prelude" is credited solely to Page himself, it is based on "Prelude No. 4 in E minor (Op. 28)" by Frédéric Chopin.

The album was re-released by Jimmy Page exclusively through JimmyPage.com on 1 December 2011, in a "heavyweight vinyl package [that] includes previously unreleased material, all-new 2011 sleeve notes and updated artwork." Only 1000 copies were released. Numbers 1–109 have been signed by Jimmy Page, while numbers 110–1000 are available unsigned.

== Track listing ==
All tracks are written by Jimmy Page, except where indicated below.

1982 vinyl edition Side one
No.	Title	Length
1.	"Who's to Blame"	2:41
2.	"The Chase"	5:48
3.	"City Sirens (Page/Edwards)"	2:01
4.	"Jam Sandwich"	2:35
5.	"Carole's Theme"	2:50
6.	"The Release"	2:35

Side two
No.	Title	Length
1.	"Hotel Rats and Photostats"	2:40
2.	"A Shadow in the City"	4:01
3.	"Jill's Theme"	4:00
4.	"Prelude"	2:20
5.	"Big Band, Sax, and Violence"	2:51
6.	"Hypnotizing Ways (Oh Mamma)"	2:49

1999 Compact disc edition
Same track listing and order as the vinyl release.

All tracks are written by Jimmy Page.

2011 Deluxe edition
No.	Title	Length
1.	"Jill's Orchestral Theme"	4:04
2.	"Alternative Jill's Theme"	1:26
3.	"9M1"	2:07
4.	"City Sirens"	2:00
5.	"Baby I Miss You So"	3:12
6.	"Hey Mama – Swinging Sax"	3:13
7.	"Carole's Theme – Strings"	1:25
8.	"Prelude"	2:15
9.	"Country Sandwich"	2:37
10.	"A Minor Sketch"	5:23

== Personnel ==
- Jimmy Page – vocals, acoustic guitars, electric guitars, guitar synthesizer, synthesizer, theremin, bass, producer
- Gordon John Edwards – vocals, electric piano, piano
- Stuart Epps – engineer, mixing
- Chris Farlowe – vocals
- Dave Lawson – piano, synthesizers
- Dave Mattacks – drums, percussion
- David Paton – bass
- David Sinclair Whittaker – piano
- GLC Philharmonic – orchestra
- The Sol Symphonic – strings

== Charts ==
Chart performance for Death Wish II
Chart (1982)	Peak position
Canada Top Albums/CDs (RPM)	28
UK Albums (Official Charts)	40
US Billboard 200	50
