= Bill Wyman (disambiguation) =

Bill Wyman (born 1936) is a British musician best known as the bass player for the Rolling Stones

Bill Wyman may also refer to:

- Bill Wyman (American football) (1951-2013), a collegiate American football player
- Bill Wyman (born 1961), an American rock music journalist and co-creator of the talk show Sound Opinions
- Bill Wyman (album), a 1982 album by the bass player
