= Green Ice (soundtrack) =

Soundtrack album by Bill Wyman
- Released: 1981
- Label: Polydor
- Producer: Bill Wyman

Bill Wyman chronology
Stone Alone (1976)	Green Ice (1981)	Bill Wyman (1982)

Green Ice is the soundtrack to the 1981 British adventure film Green Ice starring Ryan O'Neal. The soundtrack was recorded by the English rock musician Bill Wyman and contains 18 original songs.

== Track listing ==
All tracks written by Bill Wyman, except where noted.

No.	Title	Writer(s)	Vocals	Length
1.	"Si Si"			2:26
2.	"Beach Chase"			3:38
3.	"Holbrook's House (Green Ice Theme)"			2:10
4.	"Floating (Cloudhopper Theme)"		Maria Muldaur	4:13
5.	"Emerald Guitars"			1:22
6.	"Emerald Vault"			2:20
7.	"The Water Bottle"			0:38
8.	"Noche de Amore"	Wyman, Terry Taylor		2:30
9.	"Colombia (Green Ice Opening Title)"			3:14
10.	"Tenderness"		Maria Muldaur	3:30
11.	"Showdown"			2:49
12.	"Cloudhoppers"			6:10
13.	"Churchyard (Green Ice Theme)"			1:23
14.	"The Mines"			1:16
15.	"Sol y Sombra"	Wyman, Taylor		2:15
16.	"Miami Arrival"			1:32
17.	"Emerald Waltz"	Taylor		1:55
18.	"Si Si - Reprise"			1:44

== Personnel ==
- Bill Wyman – bass, guitars, harmonica, synthesizers, percussion
- Terry Taylor – acoustic, electric and Spanish guitars, kyoto, synthesizers, percussion
- Dave Mattacks – drums, percussion
- Ray Cooper – Latin percussion
- Doreen Chanter, Maria Muldaur, Stuart Epps – background vocals
- Dave Richmond – bass on "Floating (Cloudhopper Theme)" and "Tenderness"
- Tristan Fry – marimba on "Noche de Amore"
- Kenny Baker – trumpet on "Colombia (Green Ice Opening Title)" and "Sol y Sombra"
- Dave Lawson – vocoder, synthesizer on "Floating (Cloudhopper Theme)" and "Emerald Vault"
- Ken Thorne – orchestral conductor and arranger
