= Groovin' (Bill Wyman's Rhythm Kings album) =

Studio album by Bill Wyman's Rhythm Kings
- Released: 30 May 2000
- Genre: Rhythm and blues, jazz
- Length: 53:41
- Label: Roadrunner
- Producer: The Dirt Boys (Bill Wyman, Terry Taylor)

Bill Wyman's Rhythm Kings chronology
Anyway the Wind Blows (1999)	Groovin' (2000)	Double Bill (2001)

Groovin' is the third studio album by Bill Wyman's Rhythm Kings. It reached No 1 in the UK Jazz and Blues Chart.

== Track listing ==
1. "Tell You a Secret" (Bill Wyman, Terry Taylor) – 3:04
2. "Groovin'" (Eddie Brigati, Felix Cavaliere) – 3:31
3. "Rough Cut Diamond" (Wyman, Taylor) – 4:05
4. "Mood Swing" (Keith Sewell, Nial Toner, Wendy Buckner) – 4:09
5. "Hole in the Wall" (Wyman, Taylor) – 3:10
6. "Can't Get My Rest at Night" (J. David Ray) – 3:46
7. "I Put a Spell on You" (Jay Hawkins) – 4:06
8. "Tomorrow Night" (Wyman) – 5:00
9. "I Want to Be Evil" (Judson, Taylor) – 2:32
10. "Rhythm King" (Georgie Fame) – 4:52
11. "Daydream" (John Sebastian) – 4:10
12. "Oh! Baby" (Barbara Linda Ozen) – 3:56
13. "Streamline Woman" (Wyman, Taylor) – 2:53
14. "Yesterdays" (Jerome Kern, Otto Harbach) – 4:27

== Personnel ==
Musicians

- Bill Wyman – bass guitar
- Dave Hartley – acoustic piano (2–4, 8, 9, 11, 12, 14)
- Georgie Fame – organ (2, 8, 10–13), acoustic piano (5, 7)
- Chris Hall – accordion (4)
- Gary Brooker – organ (7), acoustic piano (10)
- Eddie Hession – accordion (9)
- Terry Taylor – rhythm guitar (1, 3–5, 7–10, 12, 14), acoustic guitar (2, 11, 13), lead guitar (6)
- Andy Fairweather Low – lead guitar (1)
- Tommy Emmanuel – acoustic guitar (2, 10, 13), slide guitar (3), lead guitar (5, 11), rhythm guitar (9)
- Martin Taylor – lead guitar (2, 7, 9, 13)
- Albert Lee – lead guitar (4, 10, 12, 13), lead vocals (4)
- Gerry Hogan – pedal steel guitar (4)
- Mick Taylor – slide guitar (6), lead guitar (8)
- Graham Broad – drums (1–3, 5–14)
- Henry Spinetti – drums (4)
- Ray Cooper – percussion (1–5, 7, 8, 10, 11, 13)
- Anthony Kerr – vibraphone (8)
- Nick Payn – harmonica (1), horns (1–3, 5, 8–13), horn arrangements (1–3, 5, 8–13)
- Frank Mead – horns (1–3, 5, 7–13)
- Jerry Portnoy – harmonica (3)

Vocals

- Adrian Byron Burns – lead vocals (1)
- Beverley Skeete – lead vocals (2, 7, 9, 12, 14)
- Georgie Fame – lead vocals (3, 6, 8, 10)
- Gary Brooker – lead vocals (5, 11)
- Keeley Coburn, Janice Hoyte, Anita Kelsey, Zoe Nicholas, Melanie Redmond, Beverley Skeete, Sara Skeete and Susie Webb – backing vocals

=== Production ===
- Bill Wyman – producer, arrangements
- Terry Taylor – producer
- Brian Tench – mixing engineer
- Stuart Epps – recording engineer
- Tim Young – mastering
- Russ Kane – liner notes
