= Fully Interlocking =

Studio album by Solution
- Released: October 14, 1977
- Studio: Sol Studios
- Genre: Symphonic rock
- Length: 37:37
- Label: The Rocket Record Company
- Producer: Gus Dudgeon

Solution chronology
| Cordon Bleu (1975) | Fully Interlocking (1977) | ...It's Only Just Begun... (1980) |

Fully Interlocking is the fourth album by the Dutch symphonic rock group Solution. It was released in 1977 by The Rocket Record Company. The line "Fully interlocking" appears on jigsaw puzzle boxes, as referenced on the album cover.

== History ==
Like the preceding album Cordon Bleu, Fully Interlocking was produced by Gus Dudgeon and released on the label he set up with Elton John. Another name reappearing from Cordon Bleu was engineer Phil Dunne, while Hipgnosis again did the artwork. This time the recording location was switched from Wales to The Sol in Cookham, England.

Fully Interlocking comprised four jazzy instrumental pieces sandwiched by two vocal songs, the lyrics of which were written by singer Guus Willemse. This album shares the highest quantity of instrumental tracks with their first album Solution (1971); the other four albums they released included more songs with lyrics. "Give Some More" was released as a single in Europe, backed by an edit of "Chappaqua" from Cordon Bleu. "Empty Faces" was also a 45, with "French Melodie" as the B-side.

Fully Interlocking charted in the Netherlands on 5 November 1977, reaching #30 and spending 7 weeks on the chart.

The album was re-released by CBS in 1980 (again on vinyl) and 1988 (on CD).

== Track listing ==
1. "Give Some More" (5:24)
  - Music by Tom, Willem and Guus
  - Lyrics by Guus
2. "Carousel" (7:18)
  - Music by Tom, Willem, Guus and Hans
3. "Sonic Sea" (7:19)
  - Music by Tom and Willem
4. "Free Inside" (6:20)
  - Music by Tom, Willem, Guus and Hans
5. "French Melodie" (4:35)
  - Music by Tom
6. "Empty Faces" (6:32)
  - Music and lyrics by Guus

== Personnel ==
Tom Barlage: alto sax, soprano sax, flutes, string ensemble, organ, percussion, electric piano
Willem Ennes: electric piano, acoustic piano, organ, synthesizer, string-ensemble
Guus Willemse: bass guitar, lead vocals
Hans Waterman: drums

- All backing vocals by Tom, Willem and Guus.
- Ray Cooper - congas and percussion on "Give Some More" and "Free Inside"
- Stuart Epps - additional backing vocal on "Empty Faces"

Producer: Gus Dudgeon.
Engineer: Phil Dunne.
Assistant engineer: Stuart Epps.
Mastering: Ian Cooper at Utopia Recording Studios.
Recorded by Moonlight.
