= Back to Basics (Bill Wyman album) =

Studio album by Bill Wyman
- Released: 22 June 2015
- Studio: Sphere Studios and British Grove (London, UK)
- Genre: Rock
- Length: 43:13
- Label: Proper
- Producer: Bill Wyman; Guy Fletcher

Bill Wyman chronology
| Stuff (1992) | Back to Basics (2015) |

Professional ratings
Aggregate scores
| Source | Rating |
|---|---|
| Metacritic | 48/100 |
Review scores
| Source | Rating |
| AllMusic | 3/5 stars |

Back to Basics is the fifth solo album by the former Rolling Stones bassist Bill Wyman and his first since 1992's Stuff (from which Wyman re-recorded the song "Stuff (Can't Get Enough)" for this album). It was released in June 2015 under Proper Records.

== Track listing ==
All tracks composed by Bill Wyman

Back to Basics track listing
| No. | Title | Length |
|---|---|---|
| 1. | "What and How and If and When and Why" | 3:37 |
| 2. | "I Lost My Ring" | 3:36 |
| 3. | "Love, Love, Love" | 3:40 |
| 4. | "Stuff (Can't Get Enough)" | 4:05 |
| 5. | "Running Back to You" | 4:00 |
| 6. | "She's Wonderful" | 3:56 |
| 7. | "Seventeen" | 3:49 |
| 8. | "I'll Pull You Through" | 3:06 |
| 9. | "November" | 3:44 |
| 10. | "Just a Friend of Mine" | 3:41 |
| 11. | "It's a Lovely Day" | 2:05 |
| 12. | "I Got Time" | 3:54 |

== Personnel ==
- Bill Wyman – vocals, bass guitar, acoustic piano (2–6, 8, 11, 12), programmed drums (2), keyboards (7, 9, 10), acoustic guitar (10)
- Guy Fletcher – Hammond organ (1, 3–8, 10, 12), Wurlitzer electric piano (2, 5, 6, 8, 10–12), acoustic piano (3, 7, 9, 10), acoustic guitar (8)
- Terry Taylor – guitars, programmed drums (2)
- Robbie McIntosh – additional guitars, ukulele (9, 10)
- Graham Broad – drums (1, 4–11), percussion (10)
- Gavin Goldberg – programmed drums (3), backing vocals (5)
- Frank Mead – horns (1–8, 11), harmonica (12)
- Nick Payn – horns (1–8), harmonica (7), flute (11)
- Andy Wright – "breathing" vocal (2), strings (11)
- Beverley Skeete – backing vocals (1–4, 7, 8, 12)
- Clinton "Roachie" Outten – backing vocals (6)

=== Production ===
- Guy Fletcher – producer, mixing
- Bill Wyman – producer, mixing
- Gavin Goldberg – additional production
- Andy Wright – additional production
- Terry Taylor – production assistance
- Martin Hollis – mix assistant
- Mazen Murad – mastering at Metropolis Studio (London, UK)
- Stuart Crouch Creative – art direction, design
- Judy Totton – portrait photography
- Ruth Rowland – hand lettering
