= Struttin' Our Stuff =

Studio album by Bill Wyman's Rhythm Kings
- Released: October 1997
- Studios: TV-Studio "Ohne Filter" in Baden-Baden, Germany
- Genres: Rhythm and blues, jazz
- Label: BMG
- Producers: The Dirt Boys (Bill Wyman and Terry Taylor)

Bill Wyman's Rhythm Kings chronology
Struttin' Our Stuff (1997)	Anyway the Wind Blows (1999)

Struttin' Our Stuff is the debut studio album from Bill Wyman's Rhythm Kings. Wyman re-recorded his 1992 track "Stuff (Can't Get Enough)" as well as the Rolling Stones' 1976 song "Melody".

== Track listing ==
1. "Green River" (John Fogerty) - 3:14
2. "Walking on My Own" (Linzi Hunter, Terry Taylor, Bill Wyman) - 5:36
3. "Melody" (Mick Jagger, Keith Richards) - 4:08
4. "Stuff (Can't Get Enough)" (Wyman) - 3:41
5. "Bad to Be Alone" (Wyman) - 3:19
6. "I'm Mad" (Willie Mabon) - 3:23
7. "Down in the Bottom" (Willie Dixon) - 2:57
8. "Motorvatin' Mama" (Taylor, Wyman) - 3:36
9. "Jitterbug Boogie" (Taylor, Wyman) - 3:10
10. "Going Crazy Overnight" (Taylor, Wyman) - 3:53
11. "Hole in My Soul" (Sascha Burland) - 4:03
12. "Tobacco Road" (John D. Loudermilk) - 4:33

== Personnel ==
- Bill Wyman – bass guitar, vocals (1, 2, 4, 10)
- Max Middleton – acoustic piano (1, 2, 12)
- Terry Taylor – organ (2), guitars (2, 4, 6, 7, 11), rhythm guitar (3, 5, 8–10, 12)
- Dave Hartley – acoustic piano (3–11), organ (4)
- Georgie Fame – organ (3, 11), vocals (3, 8, 11)
- Gary Brooker – organ (5)
- Albert Lee – guitars (2), lead guitar (8–10)
- Eric Clapton – lead guitar (3)
- Martin Taylor – lead guitar (5)
- Peter Frampton – lead guitar (12)
- Graham Broad – drums, percussion (1, 2, 8–10)
- Ray Cooper – percussion (4, 6)
- Frank Mead – horns (2–6, 8, 9, 11, 12), sax solo (4), harmonica (12)
- Nick Payn – horns (2–6, 8, 9, 11, 12)
- Martin Drover – horns (2–4, 11)
- Nick Pentelow – horns (5, 8, 9)
- Andy Hamilton – horns (6, 12)
- Andy Mackintosh – horns (10)
- Pete Beachill – horns (10)
- Derek Watkins – horns (10)
- Geoff Grange – harmonica (7)
- Beverley Skeete – vocals (1–3, 5)
- Geraint Watkins – vocals (6, 7)
- Mike Sanchez – vocals (9)
- Paul Carrack – vocals (12)
- Zoe Nicholas – backing vocals (1, 2, 4, 7–10, 12)
- Melanie Redmond – backing vocals (1, 2, 7–10, 12)
- Keeley Smith – backing vocals (1, 7–10, 12)
- Susie Webb – backing vocals (1)
- Natasha Kristie – backing vocals (2)
- Barbie Carey – backing vocals (4)
- Maggie Ryder – backing vocals (4)

=== Production ===
- Terry Taylor – producer, arrangements
- Bill Wyman – producer, arrangements
- Stuart Epps – recording engineer
- Glyn Johns – mix engineer
- Tony Taverner – mix engineer
- Tim Young – mastering
- Manuela Stadter – design
- Photonica – cover photography
