= Jay Cassidy =

American film editor

- Education: University of Michigan (BA); American Film Institute (MFA)
- Occupation: Film editor
- Known for: Silver Linings Playbook

Jay Cassidy is an American film editor with several credits since 1978.

== Career ==
Cassidy began his career in the 1970s working on documentaries and political advertising. He has had a notable collaboration with Sean Penn, having edited all of the films directed by Penn. Early in his career, Cassidy edited the documentary film High Schools (1983) that was directed by Charles Guggenheim; more recently he has edited several documentaries by Guggenheim's son Davis Guggenheim, including An Inconvenient Truth (2006).

Cassidy was nominated for the Academy Award for Best Film Editing and for an ACE Eddie Award for Into the Wild (directed by Sean Penn - 2007). In 2012, he was nominated for his second Academy Award for Best Film Editing for Silver Linings Playbook, which won the Eddie and the Satellite Award for Best Editing. Cassidy was nominated for a third Academy Award for American Hustle (directed by David O. Russell - 2013), and again won the Eddie for that film. He had won the Eddie for Best Documentary Editing for An Inconvenient Truth (directed by Davis Guggenheim - 2006). Both High Schools and An Inconvenient Truth were nominated for the Academy Award for Best Documentary Feature, and An Inconvenient Truth won the award.

Cassidy has been elected to membership in the American Cinema Editors.

Cassidy received a bachelor's degree from the University of Michigan circa 1972 and was a photographer for The Michigan Daily and the Michiganensian on campus. In 2006, Cassidy won the 39th Cartoon Caption Contest of The New Yorker magazine.

The Best of May, 1968, a short film directed by Cassidy in 1972, was preserved by the Academy Film Archive in 2019.

== Filmography ==
Editor
Year	Film	Director	Notes	Other notes
1978	Almost Crying	George Manupelli		
1981	The End of August	Bob Graham		
1982	Waltz Across Texas	Ernest Day		
1984	Roadhouse 66	John Mark Robinson		
1988	Aloha Summer	Tommy Lee Wallace		
1988	Fright Night Part 2	Tommy Lee Wallace		
1990	Frankenstein Unbound	Roger Corman		
1991	The Indian Runner	Sean Penn	First collaboration with Sean Penn	
1993	Bodies, Rest & Motion	Michael Steinberg		
1994	Brainscan	John Flynn		
1995	The Crossing Guard	Sean Penn	Second collaboration with Sean Penn	
1996	Albino Alligator	Kevin Spacey		
1998	The Replacement Killers	Antoine Fuqua		
1998	Urban Legend	Jamie Blanks		
2000	Gossip	Davis Guggenheim		
2001	The Pledge	Sean Penn	Third collaboration with Sean Penn	
2002	11′09″01 September 11	Sean Penn	Fourth collaboration with Sean Penn	"USA" segment
2002	Tuck Everlasting	Jay Russell		
2002	Ballistic: Ecks vs. Sever	Kaos		
2004	The Assassination of Richard Nixon	Niels Mueller		
2006	First Snow	Mark Fergus		
2007	Into the Wild	Sean Penn	Fifth collaboration with Sean Penn	
2008	Johnny Got His Gun	Rowan Joseph	Filmed live on stage	
2009	Brothers	Jim Sheridan		
2010	Conviction	Tony Goldwyn		
2011	Seeking Justice	Roger Donaldson		
2012	Silver Linings Playbook	David O. Russell	First collaboration with David O. Russell	
2013	American Hustle	David O. Russell	Second collaboration with David O. Russell	
2014	Foxcatcher	Bennett Miller		
2014	Fury	David Ayer		
2015	Joy	David O. Russell	Third collaboration with David O. Russell	
2016	The Last Face	Sean Penn	Sixth collaboration with Sean Penn	
2017	Thank You for Your Service	Jason Hall		
2018	A Star Is Born	Bradley Cooper		
2020	Birds of Prey	Cathy Yan		
2020	The King of Staten Island	Judd Apatow		
2022	Amsterdam	David O. Russell	Fourth collaboration with David O. Russell	
2023	The Burial	Maggie Betts		
2024	Killer Heat	Philippe Lacôte		
2025	Poetic License	Maude Apatow		
2026	Verity	Michael Showalter		

Producer
Year	Film	Director	Credit
1987	Three for the Road	Bill L. Norton	Associate producer
1990	Frankenstein Unbound	Roger Corman	Associate producer
2025	Poetic License	Maude Apatow	Executive producer

Camera and electrical department
Year	Film	Director	Role
1971	The Thorn	Peter McWilliams	Additional photography; Camera operator

Editorial department
Year	Film	Director	Role
1987	Nightflyers	Robert Collector	Supervising editor
2022	Amsterdam	David O. Russell	Editor

Production manager
Year	Film	Director	Role
1988	Remote Control	Jeff Lieberman	Post-production supervisor
1988	Tequila Sunrise	Robert Towne	Post-production supervisor

Sound department
Year	Film	Director	Role
1979	Heartland	Richard Pearce	Sound editor
1981	Wolfen	Michael Wadleigh	Dialogue editor

Soundtrack
Year	Film	Director	Role
1984	Roadhouse 66	John Mark Robinson	Writer: "Detroit Doll"

Thanks
Year	Film	Director	Role
1996	Albino Alligator	Kevin Spacey	The director wishes to thank
1999	The Big Kahuna	John Swanbeck	Special thanks

Documentaries

Editor
Year	Film	Director
1973	Jerusalem Lives	Charles Guggenheim
1979	HR 6161: An Act of Congress	Charles Guggenheim
1983	High Schools	Charles Guggenheim
1986	The Making of Liberty	Charles Guggenheim
2006	An Inconvenient Truth	Davis Guggenheim
2008	A Mother's Promise: Barack Obama Bio Film	Davis Guggenheim
2010	Waiting for "Superman"	Davis Guggenheim
2011	Justin Bieber: Never Say Never	Jon M. Chu
2011	From the Sky Down	Davis Guggenheim

Shorts

Editor
Year	Film	Director
1991	Norman and the Killer	Bob Graham

TV movies

Editor
Year	Film	Director
1983	Love Is Forever	Hall Bartlett
1997	The Hunchback	Peter Medak
2003	Thoughtcrimes	Breck Eisner

TV documentaries

Editor
Year	Film	Director
2001	The First Year	Davis Guggenheim

TV series

Year	Title	Notes
2005	Wanted	1 episode
2006	3 lbs	1 episode
2016	The Night Of	1 episode
