= (Si Si) Je Suis un Rock Star =

1981 single by Bill Wyman

Single by Bill Wyman

from the album Bill Wyman
- B-side: "Rio de Janeiro"
- Released: July 1981
- Recorded: 1980
- Studio: Sol (Cookham, Berkshire)
- Genre: New wave; synth-pop
- Length: 3:21 (7" single edit); 5:59 (album version); 7:24 (12" extended mix)
- Label: A&M
- Songwriter: Bill Wyman
- Producers: Chris Kimsey; Bill Wyman

Bill Wyman singles chronology
"Apache Woman" (1976)	"(Si Si) Je Suis un Rock Star" (1981)	"Visions" (1982)

Music video
- "(Si Si) Je Suis un Rock Star" on YouTube

"(Si Si) Je Suis un Rock Star" (transl. "(Yes Yes) I Am a Rock Star") is a song by the English rock musician Bill Wyman, released in July 1981 by A&M Records as the lead single from his eponymous third solo studio album.

While most of the song is in English, the chorus is in Franglais: "Je suis un rock star / Je avais un residence / Je habiter là / à la south of France / Voulez-vous / partir with me? / And come and rester là / with me in France."

Wyman originally wrote the song for Ian Dury of the Blockheads. However, finding himself unable to interest Dury or any other artist in it, he reluctantly recorded the song himself, using an accent he later described as "Cockney French".

The song's highest chart position on UK singles chart was at No. 14, and it spent nine weeks in total in the top 40.

== Track listing ==
- All songs written by Bill Wyman.

A-side

1. "(Si Si) Je Suis un Rock Star" – 3:22

B-side

2. "Rio de Janeiro" – 3:50

== Personnel ==
- Bill Wyman – lead vocals, bass guitar, all other instruments, design
- Terry Taylor – guitar, backing vocals
- Bruce Rowland – drums on "(Si Si) Je Suis un Rock Star"
- Jim Phantom – drums on "Rio De Janeiro"
- Stuart Epps – engineer
- Mike Ross – design
- Graham Hughes – photography

== Charts ==
=== Weekly charts ===
Chart (1981)	Peak position
Australia (Kent Music Report)	5
Belgium (Ultratop)	20
Netherlands	14
New Zealand (Recorded Music NZ)	6
UK (The Official Charts Company)	14

=== Year-end charts ===
Chart (1981)	Position
Australia (Kent Music Report)	70
