= 9 Lies =

Studio album by Nine Lies
- Released: 6 July 2015
- Recorded: 2010–15
- Genre: Indie rock; alt rock; pop rock
- Length: 38:17
- Label: Evil Twin Records
- Producer: Stuart Epps, Stevie Mann

Nine Lies chronology
Behind It All (2005)	9 Lies (2015)	Endemic (2020)

9 Lies is the second studio album by Northern Irish indie rock band Nine Lies and follow up to their 2005 debut album 'Behind It All'. It was released on 6 July 2015 through Evil Twin Records. The album was produced in part by legendary British record producer Stuart Epps who has worked with such artists as Elton John, Led Zeppelin, Oasis and Robbie Williams.

== Recording ==
Recording on the album started in 2010 on location in Belfast and included the track someone which was to be the first of two singles released prior to the album and Save Me which was mixed by American producer Beau Hill who worked previously with Alice Cooper, Kix and Winger. The sessions later moved to Blast Furnace studios in Derry where the band were joined by legendary English record producer Stuart Epps and the tracks 'Damn' and 'Don't ask if I'm alone' were born. These two tracks were eventually mixed at Einstein Studios in Antrim, Northern Ireland. Once more the band moved on location as the struggle of putting together the tough second album continued. The live sessions continued until 2014. The album was eventually completed in March 2015 and the 10 track album, according to Rolling Stone, elevated the band's stature "from heroes to superstars".

== Track listing ==
All songs written and composed by Stevie Mann, Dave Kernohan, Nick Black, John Rossi and Stephen McAuley.

1. "Take Me Away" – 3:50
2. "Save Me" – 3:57
3. "Damn" – 3:45
4. "Tragedy" – 3:22
5. "Nothing Left For Me" – 3:58
6. "Don't Ask If I'm Alone" – 4:01
7. "A Kill for the King" – 3:41
8. "I Don't Wanna Say" – 3:25
9. "We R1" – 4:07
10. "Someone" – 4:15

== Personnel ==
9 Lies

- Stevie Mann – vocals, Lyrics, Production
- Dave Kernohan – guitar, Vocals, Artwork
- Nick Black – guitar
- John Rossi – bass guitar, vocals, Keyboards
- Stephen McAuley – drums

Technical personnel

- 9 Lies – production (all tracks)
- Stuart Epps – production (tracks 3 and 6), additional backing vocals track 3
- Mik O'connell – engineering (tracks 3 and 6)
- Frankie McClay – Pro-Tools engineering
- Beau Hill – mixing (track 2)
- Scott Horton – mixing (tracks 1 and 4)
- Streaky – Mastering
- Dave Kernohan – design
