= Stevie Mann =

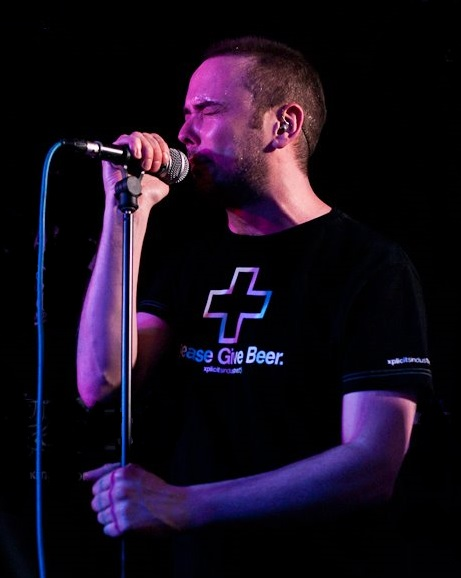
- Stevie Mann performing live with Nine Lies in Camden, London, in April 2012

Background information
- Birth name: Stephen Patrick Mann
- Born: 20 February 1976 (age 49); Belfast, Northern Ireland
- Genres: Rock, pop
- Occupation(s): Musician, songwriter, producer
- Instrument(s): Vocalist, Guitarist
- Website: Nine Lies official site

Stephen Patrick Mann (born 20 February 1976 in Belfast, Northern Ireland) is an Irish singer-songwriter and Music Producer, who is known for being the lead singer of rock band Nine Lies. He is second cousin to fellow Irish singer songwriter Damien Rice.

== Personal life ==
Mann was born and grew up on the Falls Road in Belfast. He has described in public the violence of The Troubles, during his childhood and teen years.

== Music career ==
Mann came to prominence with his band Nine Lies, appearing on a string of recordings including "Someone" (2010), "Damn", and their Christmas charity single for the RNLI "Tragedy" in 2012. He had a minor UK radio airplay hit with the self penned 2010 single Someone.

== Discography ==
Albums

- Behind It All (2005)
- 9 Lies (2015)
- Endemic (2020)

Singles

- "Someone" (2010)
- "Tragedy" (2012)
