= Monkey Grip (Bill Wyman album) =

Studio album by Bill Wyman
- Released: 10 May 1974
- Recorded: November 1973 – February 1974
- Studio: Record Plant (Sausalito, California)
- Genre: Rock
- Length: 37:05
- Label: Rolling Stones; Atlantic
- Producer: Bill Wyman

Bill Wyman chronology
Monkey Grip (1974)	Stone Alone (1976)

Singles from Monkey Grip
- 1. "White Lightnin'" Released: May 1974; 2. "Monkey Grip Glue" Released: June 1974

Monkey Grip is the debut studio album by the English rock musician Bill Wyman, released on 10 May 1974 by Rolling Stones Records.

Although Wyman sings on every track on the album, he had only sung lead on one song in the Rolling Stones, the 1967 song "In Another Land".

== Critical reception ==
Professional ratings
Review scores
Source	Rating
AllMusic	4/5 stars
Creem	D
Džuboks	(Favorable)
Record Collector	2/5 stars

In a retrospective review, Steve Kurutz writing for AllMusic rated the album four stars out of five. He noted "I Wanna Get Me a Gun", "White Lightnin" and "I'll Pull You Thro" as the best songs on the album and hinted approval of Wyman's vocals, describing them as "loose and joy-filled". They also praised the album for avoiding the usual egotism of solo albums: "Though these types of albums can be self-absorbed affairs, Monkey Grip is meant to be a relaxed, unpretentious outlet for the compositions that would never see the light of day in Wyman's main band – and, as a credit to the bassist, it comes off exactly that way."

== Track listing ==
All tracks are written by Bill Wyman, except "What a Blow", co-written by Malcolm Rebenack.

Side one
No.	Title	Length
1.	"I Wanna Get Me a Gun"	4:57
2.	"Crazy Woman"	2:41
3.	"Pussy"	2:10
4.	"Mighty Fine Time"	3:36
5.	"Monkey Grip Glue"	4:56

Side two
No.	Title	Length
6.	"What a Blow"	5:22
7.	"White Lightnin'"	2:42
8.	"I'll Pull You Thro'"	4:23
9.	"It's a Wonder"	5:30
Total length:		37:05

Bonus Tracks
No.	Title	Length
10.	"Wine and Wimmen" (Early Version)	3:42
11.	"It's Just a Matter of Time"	3:03
12.	"If You've Got the Feelin'"	3:39
13.	"Five Card Stud"	3:47
14.	"Monkey Grip Glue" (Single Edit)	3:18
15.	"What a Blow" (Single Edit)	3:46
16.	"White Lightnin'" (Single Mix)	2:44
17.	"Pussy" (Single Mix)	2:11

== Personnel ==
- Bill Wyman – vocals, bass guitar (1–5, 8, 9), acoustic guitar (3, 4, 7, 8), Jew's harp (3), acoustic piano (4), backing vocals (4), electric guitar (6)
- Dr. John – acoustic piano (1), organ (6), pedalboard (6)
- Duane Smith – acoustic piano (2, 8)
- Leon Russell – acoustic piano (4)
- William "Smitty" Smith – acoustic piano (5)
- Hubert Heard – organ (8, 9), acoustic piano (9)
- Danny Kortchmar – electric guitar (1, 2, 4–6, 9), 12-string guitar (7, 8)
- Joey Murcia – electric guitar (2)
- George Terry – slide guitar (2), electric guitar (8)
- Jackie Clark – electric guitar (3, 4, 8)
- John McEuen – banjo (3), dobro (7), mandolin (7)
- Lowell George – lead guitar (5)
- Dallas Taylor – drums
- Joe Lala – percussion (1–3, 5–9)
- Byron Berline – fiddle (3, 6)
- Peter Graves – trombone (3)
- George McCrae – backing vocals (1, 2, 5, 8, 9)
- Gwen McCrae – backing vocals (1, 2, 5, 8, 9)
- Betty Wright – backing vocals (1, 2, 5, 8, 9)
- Abigale Haness – backing vocals (4)

Boneroo Horns (Tracks 1, 2, 4–6 & 8)

- Bill Wyman – horn arrangements
- Neal Bonsanti – baritone saxophone, tenor saxophone, cor anglais
- Mark Colby – soprano saxophone, tenor saxophone, clarinet
- Peter Graves – trombone, euphonium, horn arrangements
- Ken Faulk – trumpet, flugelhorn

=== Production ===
- Bill Wyman – producer, arrangements
- Howard Albert – assistant production, engineer, mixing
- Ron Albert – assistant production, engineer, mixing
- Karl Richardson – mastering at Criteria Studios (Miami, Florida)
- Jimmy Wachtel – design, artwork
- Amanda Finch – design assistant, artwork assistant
- Bob Jenkins – photography

== Charts ==
Chart (1974)	Peak position
Australia (Kent Music Report)	36
United Kingdom (Official Charts Company)	39
United States (Billboard 200)	99
