= High Schools (film) =

1984 film

- Directed by: Charles Guggenheim
- Produced by: Charles Guggenheim; Nancy Sloss
- Cinematography: Wayne Ewing
- Edited by: Jay Cassidy
- Production company: Guggenheim Productions
- Distributed by: Carnegie Foundation for the Advancement of Teaching and WETA
- Release date: 1984
- Running time: 59 minutes
- Country: United States
- Language: English

High Schools is a 1984 American documentary film produced and directed by Charles Guggenheim. It is based on Ernest L. Boyer's book, High School, and was filmed on location in seven American high schools. The film was nominated for an Academy Award for Best Documentary Feature.
