= 11 Harrowhouse =

1974 film by Aram Avakian

- Film poster
- Directed by: Aram Avakian
- Written by: Charles Grodin (adaptation)
- Screenplay by: Jeffrey Bloom
- Based on: 11 Harrowhouse; 1972 novel by Gerald A. Browne
- Produced by: Elliott Kastner; Denis Holt (associate producer)
- Starring: Charles Grodin; Candice Bergen; James Mason; Trevor Howard; John Gielgud
- Cinematography: Arthur Ibbetson
- Edited by: Anne V. Coates
- Music by: Michael J. Lewis
- Color process: DeLuxe Color
- Production company: Harrowhouse Productions
- Distributed by: 20th Century Fox
- Release date: 15 August 1974 (London)
- Running time: 95 minutes
- Country: United Kingdom
- Language: English

11 Harrowhouse (also known as Fast Fortune) is a 1974 British heist comedy thriller film directed by Aram Avakian and starring Charles Grodin, Candice Bergen, James Mason, Trevor Howard, and John Gielgud. It was adapted by Grodin based on the 1972 novel of the same title by Gerald A. Browne, with the screenplay by Jeffrey Bloom.

== Plot ==
In England, a small-time diamond merchant is unexpectedly offered the chance to supervise the purchase and cutting of an extremely large diamond to be named after its wealthy owner. When the diamond is stolen from him, he is blackmailed into pulling off a major heist at "The System," located at 11 Harrowhouse Street, City of London with the help of his beautiful and wealthy girlfriend. The key figure in the theft, however, is the inside man Watts, who works in the vault at The System. Watts is dying of cancer and wants to leave his family financially secure.

Although The System has an elaborate network of defences and alarms against intruders, the robbery is carried out at night by gaining access to the roof from an adjacent property and threading a hosepipe down a conduit into the vault, where Watts uses it to vacuum up thousands of rough diamonds out of their drawers. The thieves leave before the robbery is discovered, and when found in the vault in the morning, Watts claims to have eaten the gems. Before he can confess, Watts deliberately swallows poison and dies at 11 Harrowhouse Street. Most of the loot is buried in concrete, to prevent it flooding the market.

== Cast ==
- Charles Grodin as Howard R. Chesser
- Candice Bergen as Maren Shirell
- James Mason as Charles D. Watts
- Trevor Howard as Clyde Massey
- John Gielgud as Meecham, the head man at The System
- Helen Cherry as Lady Bolding
- Peter Vaughan as Coglin
- Cyril Shaps as Wildenstein
- Leon Greene as Toland
- Jack Watson as Miller
- Jack Watling as Fitzmaurice
- Clive Morton as Sir Harold
- Larry Cross as Whitman
- John Siddall as hands used to paint the cockroaches

== Production ==
The film was made at Pinewood Studios with extensive location shooting in London, Ragley Hall in Warwickshire and at Quainton Road railway station. The film's sets were designed by the art director Peter Mullins.

Editor Anne Coates said the director "was a real character. He had been a very top editor... But he was totally disorganised. And, so, it was not easy to cut the work in a way. Because, Elliott Kastner wanted a straightforward storyline movie; Aram was the kind of director that shot off the cuff, bits and pieces here and there as he felt like it." She also says Charles Grodin "was very difficult to handle" and did not get along with Bergen "so, you know, it caused a lot of problems. But I think the main problem with that film was the scripts, the first script was so much better than the ten they wrote afterwards. Because everybody was putting input into it."

During production while filming, Charles Grodin was in a different room of the manor they were filming, a maid confronted Grodin and said "did someone tell you to come into this room?" Grodin said no. Her reply was "It would be soo nice if you weren't here.." Years later, Grodin decided to name his 1989 book It Would Be Soo Nice If You Weren't Here: My Journey Through Show Business.

== Release ==
11 Harrowhouse opened 15 August 1974 at the Carlton Theatre in Haymarket, London.

== Reception ==
The Monthly Film Bulletin wrote: "Despite many incidental felicities, Aram Avakian seems to have had some difficulty finding the right tone for this robbery caper, which ultimately tumbles between several stools into that timehonoured transatlantic cliché: the American outsider grappling with a bland wall of English bowlers, brollies and phlegm. At the outset, the device of having Chesser's off-screen voice quietly introducing himself behind the credits, and hinting at the subversive role he will soon be playing while we watch an attempted robbery being foiled (the System's security guards cheerfully blow up the thieves), seems to be a grave miscalculation: what has interior monologue to do with this glossy, James Bondian world? Gradually, however, this narration begins to pay dividends. ... The last sequences, in fact, are an unqualified disaster: an elaborate, badly constructed and totally unfunny car chase (its clichéd awfulness compounded by the admixture of a fox-hunting motif) which presupposes that everyone has gone momentarily mad. It is a sad end to a film which might have been a worthy companion piece to Cops and Robbers."

A.D. Murphy in Variety wrote: "Grodin messes up the film with ineffective shy-guy acting, and clobbers it with catatonic voice-over that is supposed to be funny ... Howard and Mason appear close to embarrassed in their roles."

Stanley Kauffmann of The New Republic wrote that 11 Harrowhouse's finale was apparently 'devised by a moron high on LSD' but praised James Mason's acting saying 'he creates a whole man in the middle of roaring nonsense'.

Leslie Halliwell said: "Amusing caper story marred by sudden changes of mood."

The Radio Times Guide to Films gave the film 2/5 stars, writing: "This overeager comedy foolhardily attempts to send up the heist caper. Only the bullish playing saves the day, as Aram Avakian's direction is so slipshod that the enterprise has descended into low farce long before the extended chase finale. Hard though Charles Grodin and Candice Bergen try as the ingenious vacuuming jewel thieves, they're totally outclassed by a venerable supporting cast."

== Versions ==
The film has been screened in two versions in the past, both with and without narration from Grodin's character, Howard R. Chesser. The version without narration plays under two alternate titles, either Anything for Love or Fast Fortune. Neither version was broadcast often on television; the version without the narration was the most widely available for purchase for a time. The film was released on LaserDisc by Fox Video in Widescreen format and with the narration intact.

== Home media ==
On 2 February 2011, Shout! Factory released the film on Region 1 DVD.

== See also ==
- Heist film
