= Bill Wyman's Rhythm Kings =

British band (1997–2018)

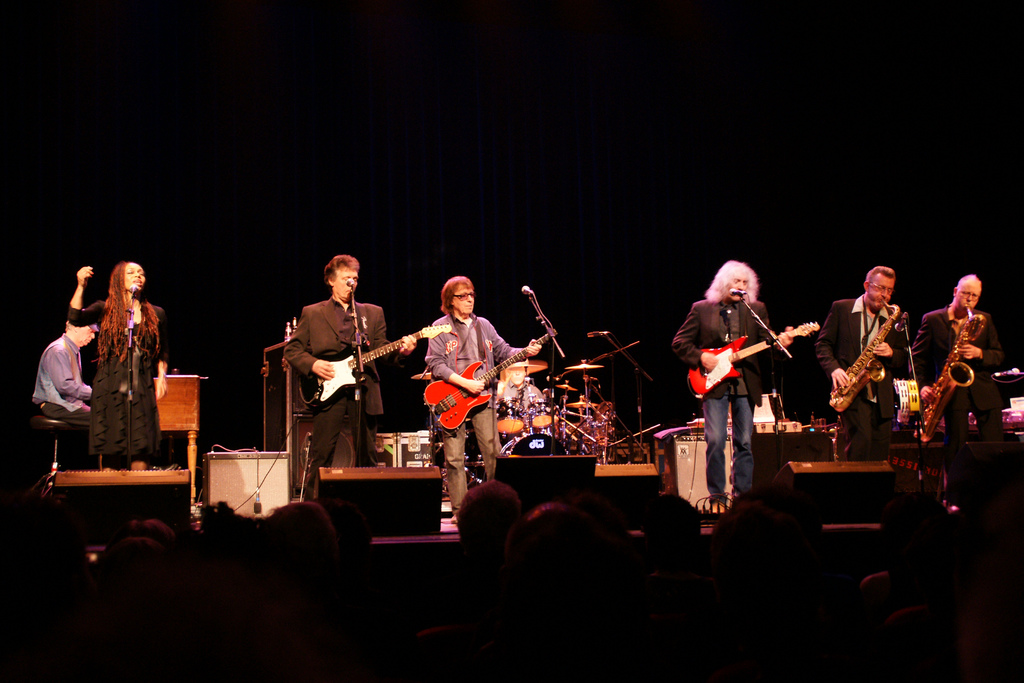
- Bill Wyman's Rhythm Kings Middelburg January, 2009

Background information
- Origin: London, England
- Genres: Rhythm and blues; rock and roll; blues; jazz
- Years active: 1997–2018
- Past members: Bill Wyman; Graham Broad; Georgie Fame; Albert Lee; Martin Taylor; Terry Taylor; Gary U.S. Bonds; Nick Payn; Frank Mead; Beverley Skeete; Geraint Watkins; Mick Taylor
- Website: Bill Wyman's Rhythm Kings

Bill Wyman's Rhythm Kings were a British blues rock band founded and led by bassist Bill Wyman of the Rolling Stones. Other personnel varied depending on availability, an arrangement described in The Telegraph as "a fluctuating squad of veterans". Their concerts and albums tend to emphasize cover songs of blues, R&B and early rock and roll hits from the 1950s.

== History ==
Wyman formed the Rhythm Kings after leaving the Rolling Stones in 1993 following their worldwide tour in support of Steel Wheels and a short hiatus from the music industry, citing a desire to work in smaller clubs and avoid the pressure of being in one of the most successful rock bands in the world.

On 10 December 2007, Wyman and his band appeared alongside a reunited Led Zeppelin at the Ahmet Ertegun Tribute Concert at the O2 in London.

In 2009, ex-Rolling Stones guitarist Mick Taylor was invited as a guest performer with Wyman's Rhythm Kings.

The band have not performed live since 2014, and last released a studio album – Studio Time – in 2018.

== Discography ==
Studio albums

- Struttin' Our Stuff (October 1997)
- Anyway the Wind Blows (February 1999)
- Groovin' (May 2000)
- Double Bill (May 2001)
- Just for a Thrill (May 2004)
- Studio Time (2018)

Live albums

- Rhythm Kings Live (November 2005)
- Live Communication (September 2011)

Compilation albums

- Studio Time (April 2018)

Singles

- "Groovin'" / "Can't Get My Rest at Night" / "Gambler's Lament" (2000)
- "That's How Heartaches Are Made" / "I Know (You Don't Love Me No More)" (2004)

Video albums

- Bill Wyman's Rhythm Kings in Concert (2002)
- Bill Wyman's Rhythm Kings - Let the Good Times Roll (2004)

== Featured musicians ==
Touring members

- Bill Wyman bass guitar and vocals
- Gary Brooker keyboards and vocals
- Georgie Fame keyboards and vocals
- Mike Sanchez keyboards and vocals
- Beverly Skeete vocals
- Janice Hoyte vocals
- Eddie Floyd vocals
- Graham Broad drums
- Albert Lee guitar and vocals
- Andy Fairweather-Low guitar and vocals
- Martin Taylor guitar
- Terry Taylor guitar and vocals
- Nick Payn saxophone
- Frank Mead saxophone
- Geraint Watkins keyboards and vocals
- Gary U.S. Bonds vocals

Studio guests

- Paul Carrack vocals
- Eric Clapton guitar
- Tommy Emmanuel guitar
- Peter Frampton guitar
- George Harrison guitar
- Mark Knopfler guitar
- Mick Taylor guitar
- Odetta vocals
- Anita Kelsey backing vocals
- Chris Stainton keyboards
- Max Middleton keyboards
- Henry Spinetti drums
- Ray Cooper percussion
- Axel Zwingenberger piano

== See also ==
- Ringo Starr & His All Starr Band
- World Classic Rockers
