= Stone Alone =

Studio album by Bill Wyman
- Released: 27 February 1976
- Recorded: August–September 1975
- Studio: Record Plant (Sausalito, California); Record Plant (Los Angeles, California)
- Genre: Rock
- Length: 40:07
- Label: Rolling Stones; Atlantic
- Producer: Bill Wyman

Bill Wyman chronology
Monkey Grip (1974)	Stone Alone (1976)	Green Ice (1981)

Singles from Monkey Grip
- 1. "If You Wanna Be Happy" Released: 1976; 2. "Apache Woman" Released: 1976

Stone Alone is the second solo studio album by the English rock musician Bill Wyman, released on 27 February 1976 by Rolling Stones Records. The album reached No. 166 on the US Billboard 200.

Van Morrison plays saxophone in "A Quarter to Three". Joe Walsh, Dr. John, Ronnie Wood, Al Kooper, Nicky Hopkins, and Jim Keltner played on the album.

Bill Wyman is also the author of a book called Stone Alone: The Story of a Rock 'n' Roll Band (1990), not to be confused with this album.

== Critical reception ==
Professional ratings
Review scores
Source	Rating
AllMusic	1.5/5 stars
Christgau's Record Guide	C+

In a retrospective review, Donald Guarisco of AllMusic rated the album one and a half stars out of five. He noted "Apache Woman" and "Quarter to Three" but cautioned that "highlights like these are few and far between and this problem reduces Stone Alone to a curio that should only be sought out by Bill Wyman fans and Rolling Stones completists." He criticized the album for lacking "the focus and solid songs of the previous album and ends up feeling like the typical rock star's ego-trip side project. Stone Alone can't be faulted for ambition, though: nearly every song tries out a different musical style ('50s-style rock, disco, and reggae) and Wyman enlists a veritable who's who of guest musicians (everyone from Dr. John to Al Kooper to Joe Walsh) to bring the songs to life."

== Track listing ==
All tracks are written by Bill Wyman, except where noted.

Side one
No.	Title	Writer(s)	Length
1.	"A Quarter to Three"	Gene Barge, Frank J. Guida; Joseph F. Royster; Gary Anderson	3:08
2.	"Gimme Just One Chance"		2:47
3.	"Soul Satisfying"		2:50
4.	"Apache Woman"		3:32
5.	"Every Sixty Seconds"		4:12
6.	"Get It On"		3:42

Side two
No.	Title	Writer(s)	Length
7.	"Feet"	Danny Kortchmar	3:53
8.	"Peanut Butter Time"		3:50
9.	"Wine and Wimmen"		3:27
10.	"If You Wanna Be Happy"	Rafael de Leon; Joseph Royster; Carmella Guida; Frank Guida	2:42
11.	"What's the Point"		2:32
12.	"No More Foolin'"		3:32
Total length:			40:07

Bonus Tracks
No.	Title	Length
13.	"High Flying Bird"	2:50
14.	"Back to School Again"	2:40
15.	"Can't Put Your Picture Down"	3:07
16.	"Love Is Such a Wonderful Thing"	4:20
17.	"A Quarter to Three" (Single Mix)	2:57
18.	"Apache Woman" (Single Mix)	3:02

== Personnel ==
- Bill Wyman – vocals, bass guitar, percussion (1, 7), acoustic piano (2), acoustic guitars (4), electric guitars (4–6), tack piano (8)
- Mark Naftalin – acoustic piano (1, 8, 12)
- Dr. John – organ (2), marimba (2), electric piano (3)
- Albhy Galuten – synthesizers (3, 4, 6, 9, 10)
- Paul Harris – organ (3)
- Hubert Heard – organ (4, 6, 9, 10)
- Nicky Hopkins – acoustic piano (6), organ (8)
- Al Kooper – acoustic piano (7)
- Bob Welch – electric guitars (1, 12), acoustic guitars (2, 8)
- Jackie Clark – electric guitars (3, 9)
- Danny Kortchmar – electric guitars (3, 4, 6–10), acoustic guitars (9)
- Terry Taylor – electric guitars (3, 4), slide guitar (6), Leslie guitar (9)
- Joe Walsh – slide guitar (5, 11), electric guitars (7)
- Ronnie Wood – electric guitars (7)
- John McFee – pedal steel guitar (11), fiddle (11)
- Dallas Taylor – drums (1–4, 6, 8–11), percussion (1, 7)
- Jim Keltner – drums (5)
- Joe Vitale – drums (7), R.M.I keyboard (11)
- Greg Errico – drums (12)
- Guille Garcia – percussion (1, 3, 4, 7–9)
- Robert Greenidge – steelpan (3)
- Rocky Dzidzornu – percussion (9)
- Van Morrison – alto saxophone (1), harmonica (5), acoustic guitar (11)
- Mark Colby – saxophone (10)
- Floyd Cooley – tuba (12)
- Bonnie Pointer – backing vocals (1, 3–5, 7–9, 11)
- Ruth Pointer – backing vocals (1, 3–5, 7–9, 11)
- Clydie King – backing vocals (2, 10)
- Venetta Fields – backing vocals (2, 10)
- Paula Harrison – backing vocals (7)

=== Horn section ===
- Bill Wyman – arrangements
- Stephen Kupka – horns, arrangements
- Emilio Castillo – horns, arrangements
- Lenny Pickett – horns, arrangements
- Mic Gillette – horns, arrangements
- Craig Dentweiler – additional horns

=== Production ===
- Bill Wyman – producer, arrangements, mixing (1–3, 5–12)
- Gary Kellgren – engineer, mixing (1–3, 5–12)
- Tom Dowd – mixing (1–3, 5–12)
- Howard Albert – engineer (2–4, 6, 9, 10), production assistant
- Ron Albert – engineer (2–4, 6, 9, 10), production assistant
- Tom Moulton – mixing (4)
- Anita Wexler – mixing (4)
- Dennis King – mastering at Atlantic Studios (New York City, New York)
- Bill King – photography
- Pierre LaRoche – cover concept, set design, make-up
- Larry Lalso – title lettering
