= Ernest Day =

British cinematographer and director

- Born: Ernest Day; 15 April 1927; Surrey, England
- Died: 16 November 2006 (aged 79); Surrey, England
- Other name: Ernst Day
- Occupations: Cinematographer, film director, television director, camera operator
- Years active: 1944–1996
- Relatives: Robert Day (brother)

Ernest Day, B.S.C. (15 April 1927 - 16 November 2006) was a British cinematographer and director of film and television, known for his collaborations with David Lean and Lewis Gilbert. He spent the majority of his career as a camera operator, often referred to Lean as his "eyes", and was the first British cameraman to operate a 70mm film camera. He was nominated for an Academy Award and BAFTA Award for Lean's final film A Passage to India (1984).

== Career ==
=== Early career ===
Day initially worked as a clapper loader for various movies from 1944 to 1948, then as a focus puller for 1949 to 1950.

He was a cameraman for the British film The Cockleshell Heroes, released in 1955 and acted as camera operator on several more Warwick Films where he was credited as a technician on Hell Below Zero.

He continued this through 1976, when he contributed notably to American films Exodus (1960), Lord Jim (1965), the James Bond film You Only Live Twice (1967), Davey Major Roads' (1969), Stanley Kubrick's A Clockwork Orange (1971), as well as three films by David Lean. His last film as a cameraman was released in 1988.

=== Cinematography ===
As a cinematographer, he has worked on fourteen feature films, the first of which was Peter Collinson's British film The Long Day's Dying, released in 1968. He also worked on Bob Balaban's Parents (with Randy Quaid and Mary Beth Hurt), released in 1989. Some other notable films include Revenge of the Pink Panther (1978), David Lean's A Passage to India (1984), and Superman 4 (1987).

Additionally, Day served as a director of photography for a number of TV movies between 1983 and 1994.

=== Director and Second Unit Director ===
Day resumed his collaboration with Lewis Gilbert as second unit director of The Adventurers (1970), Operation Daybreak (1975), two more James Bond films, The Spy Who Loved Me (1977) and Moonraker (1979), and Rambo III (1988), among others.

Day also directed television episodes, such as two episodes of The New Avengers and a 1978 episode of The Professionals.

Day directed the theatrical films Green Ice (1981) and Waltz Across Texas (1982).

== Filmography ==
Cinematographer

- The Long Day's Dying (1968)
- Running Scared (1972)
- Made (1972)
- Visit to a Chief's Son (1974)
- The Song Remains the Same (1976)
- Revenge of the Pink Panther (1978)
- Sphinx (1981)
- China Rose (1983, television film)
- Cook & Peary: The Race to the Pole (1983, television film)
- A Passage to India (1984)
- Deceptions (1985, television film)
- Let's Go (1985, short film)
- As Summers Die (1986, television film)
- Superman IV: The Quest for Peace (1987)
- Burning Secret (1988)
- Parents (1989) - with Robin Vidgeon
- Women & Men: Stories of Seduction (1990, television film) - with Billy Williams & Steve Yaconelli
- Young Catherine (1991, television miniseries)
- Fire: Trapped on the 37th Floor (1991, television film)
- Spender (1993, television series) - 2 episodes
- Incident in a Small Town (1994, television film)

Director

- The New Avengers (1977, television series) - 2 episodes
- The Professionals (1978, television series) - 1 episode
- Green Ice (1981)
- Waltz Across Texas (1982)

2nd unit director/DoP

- The Adventurers (1970)
- Ghost in the Noonday Sun (1973)
- Operation Daybreak (1975)
- Lucky Lady (1975)
- The Spy Who Loved Me (1977)
- Shalimar (1978)
- Moonraker (1979)
- All Quiet on the Western Front (1979, television film)
- April Morning (1988, television film)
- Rambo III (1988)
- Bethune: The Making of a Hero (1990)
- Mission: Impossible (1996)

== Accolades ==
- 1985 Academy Award for Best Cinematography: A Passage to India (nominated)
- 1985 B.S.C. Best Cinematography Award: A Passage to India (nominated)
- 1986 BAFTA Award for Best Cinematography: A Passage to India (nominated)
- 1992 Gemini Award for Best Photography in a Dramatic Program or Series: Young Catherine (nominated)
