= Runaway (Solution album) =

Studio album by Solution
- Released: March 14, 1982
- Recorded: Spitsbergen Studio, Netherlands
- Genres: Rock, pop
- Label: CBS
- Producers: Jim Capaldi and Solution

Solution chronology
...It's Only Just Begun... (1980)	Runaway (1982)	Solution Live (1983)

Runaway is the sixth and last studio album by the Dutch rock group Solution. It was released in 1982 on CBS Records.

== History ==
Runaway has eight songs in a shorter, more direct format than previous recordings. Earlier songs like "Empty Faces" (1977) and "It's Only Just Begun" (1980) had hinted at a more commercial approach, and Runaway continued this trend to the extreme. Unlike their previous five albums, it did not include any instrumental tracks.

Jim Capaldi of Traffic co-produced the album with the band. Capaldi also wrote or co-wrote the lyrics to seven of the eight songs. He covered two of the songs, "Runaway" and "Bad Breaks", on his next solo album, Fierce Heart.

Runaway entered the chart in the Netherlands on 13 March 1982, reaching #14 and spending 9 weeks on the chart. The title track was also a hit when released as a single.

Four songs from Runaway appeared on Solution Live the following year; this album and the four remaining studio tracks were included on The Ultimate Collection in 2006.

== Track listing ==
1. "Run Away" (3:50)
  - Music: Solution
  - Lyrics: J. Capaldi, H. Waterman
2. "Shame On You" (4:28)
  - Music: Solution
  - Lyrics: J. Capaldi
3. "Move On" (4:23)
  - Music: Solution
  - G. Willemse, J. Capaldi
4. "Evil Love" (5:07)
  - Music: G. Willemse
  - Lyrics: J. Capaldi
  - Arr. Solution
5. "Bad Breaks" (4:43)
  - Music: W.T. Ennes
  - Lyrics: J. Capaldi
6. "Who's to Blame" (4:57)
  - Music: G. Willemse-arr. Solution
  - Lyrics: G. Willemse, J. Capaldi
7. "Down Hearted!" (4:15)
  - Music & lyrics: G. & B. McDonough, S. Higgins
8. "Lovin' You Was Easy" (4:44)
  - Music: G. Willemse
  - Lyrics: G. Willemse, J. Capaldi

== Personnel ==
- Tom Barlage: alto sax, keyboards, percussion
- Willem Ennes: keyboards
- Harry Hardholt: guitars
- Hans Waterman: drums, percussion
- Gus Willemse: bass guitar, vocals

== Production ==
- Produced by Jim Capaldi and Solution
- Recorded at Spitsbergen Studio, the Netherlands
- Engineering by T. Barlage, W. Ennes.
- "Shame On You" basic track recorded at the Triple Sound Studio, Driebergen, the Netherlands

== Other Staff ==
- Airbrush: Ph. M. Awuy
- Lettering: H. Schutten
- Photography: K. de Jong
- Art direction: H. de Jong
- Design: W. van Ginkel
