= Nine Lies =

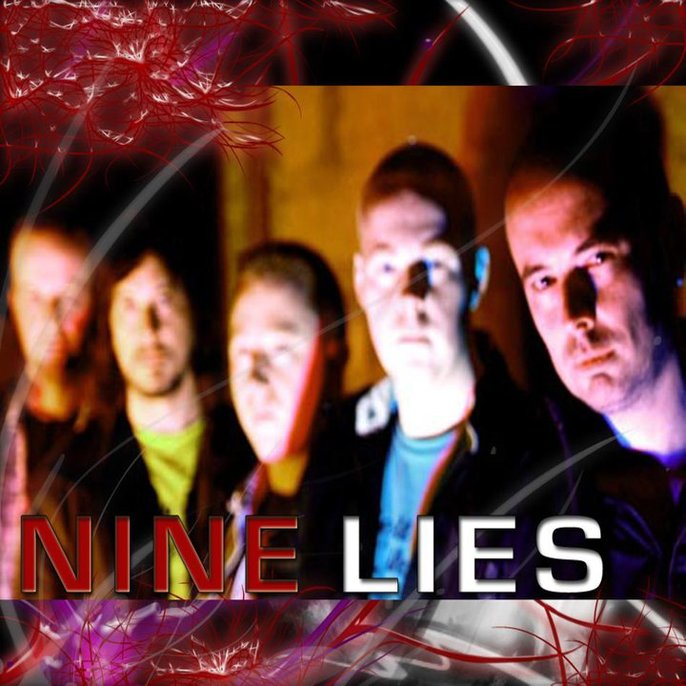
- Nine Lies Promo Madison Square Garden in November 2013, from left to right: Stephen McAuley; John Rossi; Nick Black; Dave Kernohan; Stevie Mann

Background information
- Origin: Belfast, Northern Ireland
- Genres: Alternative rock; indie rock; post-punk revival; post-Britpop; new wave; heartland rock; pop rock
- Years active: 2003–present
- Label: Evil Twin Records
- Members: Stevie Mann; Dave Kernohan; Nick Black; John Rossi; Stephen McAuley
- Website: www.ninelies.net

Nine Lies are a Northern Irish rock band from Belfast. Formed in 2003, the group consists of Stevie Mann (vocals, lyrics and production), Dave Kernohan (guitar and vocals), Nick Black (guitars), Stephen 'Stoogie' McAuley (drums) and John Rossi (bass guitar, keyboards and vocals). John started his professional career in the late 1990s playing keyboards for another Irish rock band Snow Patrol. Nine Lies' early sound was rooted in post-Brit Pop but eventually grew to incorporate influences from many genres of popular music. Throughout the group's musical pursuits, they have maintained a sound built on melodic instrumentals. Their lyrics, often embellished with spiritual imagery, focus on personal themes and sociopolitical concerns.

== Career ==
The band formed in Belfast in 2003 with an eclectic musical background, but by 2007, Nine Lies had become an international act. Playing successful music festivals such as Vena Music Festival in Łodzi Poland Where the band shared the same stage as Fun Lovin Criminals and Sugababes followed closely by the Tryxo tour which kicked off in Bonn Germany. During this time they were more successful as a touring act than they were at selling records. Within a further three years they signed with Maddie Records and all that was set to change with the release in 2010 of their debut single Someone and arguably peaked with their 2015 album 9 Lies which, according to Rolling Stone, elevated the band's stature "from heroes to superstars". In 2012 after a failed recording relationship with Maddie Records Nine Lies and Maddie Records parted ways. The band were then rapidly snapped up the same year by management company Eerie Management and under the watchful eye of Tish Romanov they went on to record the videos to Take Me Away and Nothing Left for Me, Worked with American Producer Beau Hill on Save Me and secured a touring agreement with ACA Music. The band's latest album 9 Lies has an increased alternative rock influence, and embraced a more ironic and self-deprecating image. On 25 October 2015 the then-new album was Kildare FM's featured album and all tracks were broadcast live on the Irish Station

In 2012, the band were a part of the BBC Northern Ireland digital TV switchover alongside UK TV personality Gloria Hunniford. The band performed covers of The Beatles I Want to Hold Your Hand and "I Saw Her Standing There" to local press, Lord Mayors and TV news including ITV and BBC.

In 2013, the band were listed in the Huffington Posts Top 10 bands from Northern Ireland. Shortly after Manager Tish Romanov fell ill which ended the band's association with Eerie Management. Nine Lies currently release under their own label Evil Twin Records. In 2014 the band became regional multilingual media darlings when the BBC threw their weight behind Nine Lies and their tracks Take Me Away and the 2010 single Someone, with not only broadcast coverage but a website supplied not just in English but in Welsh and Scottish reinforcing a relationship with the broadcaster that carries on to this day.

Nine Lies have released two studio albums, two singles and three EPS. They have won best Rock Band 2012 on Pirate Radio of the Treasure Coast WKKC-DB, and, in 2013, were crowned 'pick of the week' on Beat 100 in their first year of eligibility. Throughout their career, as a band and as individuals, they have campaigned for human rights and philanthropic causes, including Amnesty International

On 19 May 2020, the band announced on their official news page that they are set to release their third studio album, to be entitled 'Endemic', on 7 September 2020. On 6 July 2020 the BBC Radio Ulster ATL show tweeted that they would be playing the worldwide exclusive of a new track from the upcoming album.

On 22 August 2020 the new Endemic album received a pre release review in the iconic German magazine Skylight, where it was described as "The album features a plethora of diverse musical references such as Cure on vocals or even some 80s Loverboy tunes which come up upon listening to the guitar parts. On the other hand, the production is modern and powerful with less old-fashioned elements. I am sure that fans of melodic rock will enjoy this due to the great musicianship of the members"

== Band members ==
- Stevie Mann – vocals, Lyrics Production
- Dave Kernohan – guitar, vocals
- Nick Black – lead guitar
- John Rossi – bass guitar
- Stephen McAuley, Stoogie. – drums

== Discography ==
Studio albums

- Behind it All (2003)
- 9 Lies (2015)
- Endemic (2020)
