= Divergence (album) =

Studio album by Solution
- Released: 1972
- Genres: Progressive rock, jazz rock
- Label: Harvest Records
- Producer: John Schuursma

Solution chronology
Solution (1971)	Divergence (1972)	Cordon Bleu (1975)

Divergence is the second album by the Dutch progressive rock group Solution. It was released in 1972 on the EMI subsidiary Harvest Records.

== History ==
This album is among the most progressive by the group. It consists of three instrumental pieces ("Fever", "Theme" and the title track) next to three tracks with vocals, sung by Guus Willemse, who had joined the band in 1971.

Beginning as a piano-led song, "Second Line" "diverges" into a lengthy instrumental section which reprises a theme first heard in "Preview", from the album Solution the previous year. Similarly, "Theme" is based on a motif from the introduction to "Concentration".

Part of the track "Divergence" was used by Focus in their "Eruption" suite, found on their 1971 album Focus II (Moving Waves). The section was titled "Tommy" after Solution saxophonist Tom Barlage. Consequently, the original song is perhaps the most well-known Solution track, owing to the success Focus enjoyed in the early seventies (Focus II is also home to the hit single "Hocus Pocus").

Divergence was reissued in 1976 as a double set with the first album, simply titled Solution. The shortest song, "Fever", was left off the subsequent reissue on Compact Disc in 1988, but was included on The Ultimate Collection in 2006.

== Track listing ==
1. "Second Line" (8:44)
  - (Waterman/Barlage/Willemse/Ennes)
2. "Divergence" (5:58)
  - (Waterman/Barlage/Willemse/Ennes)
3. "Fever" (4:22)
  - (Waterman/Barlage/Willemse/Ennes)
4. "Concentration" (12:28)
  - (Waterman/Barlage/Willemse/Ennes)
5. "Theme" (:38)
  - (Waterman/Barlage/Willemse/Ennes)
6. "New Dimension" (6:25)
  - (Waterman/Barlage/Willemse/Ennes)

== Personnel ==
- Tom Barlage – saxophone, flute
- Willem Ennes – keyboards
- Guus Willemse – bass guitar, vocals
- Hans Waterman – drums
