= ...It's Only Just Begun... =

Studio album by Solution
- Released: March 16, 1980
- Recorded: Spitsbergen Studio, the Netherlands
- Genre: Symphonic rock
- Label: CBS
- Producer: Solution

Solution chronology
Fully Interlocking (1977)	...It's Only Just Begun... (1980)	Runaway (1982)

...It's Only Just Begun... is the fifth album by the Dutch symphonic rock group Solution. It was released in 1980 on CBS Records.

== History ==
Recorded in Spitsbergen Studio in the North of their native country the Netherlands, and mixed in the English Moonlight Studio, ...It's Only Just Begun... was the first Solution album to be self-produced, though they were assisted by Phil Dunne, who had engineered their previous albums Cordon Bleu and Fully Interlocking.

Five of the seven tracks had vocals, with only "Captain Willie" and "Logic" completely instrumental. Guesting on the latter piece was Jan Akkerman from fellow Dutch band Focus.

...It's Only Just Begun... charted in the Netherlands on 5 April 1980, reached #12 and spent 13 weeks on the chart. The title track also became a minor hit when released as a single. Its B-side was an instrumental version, which has not been made available on CD.

"On My Own", "Mirror", "Logic" and "It Happened in September" were included on the 2006 compilation The Ultimate Collection; "Captain Willie", "100 Words" and the title track appeared in live form.

== Track listing ==
No.	Title	Writer(s)	Length
1.	"On My Own"	Waterman/Barlage/Ennes/Akkerman	6:35
2.	"Captain Willie"	Ennes	5:30
3.	"Mirror (Of Your Life)"	Barlage/Willemse/Ennes	8:36
4.	"Logic"	Barlage/Ennes	6:40
5.	"It Happened in September"	Willemse/Ennes	6:20
6.	"It's Only Just Begun"	Waterman/Barlage/Willemse/Ennes	4:50
7.	"100 Words"	Willemse	4:00

== Personnel ==
Tom Barlage: flute, saxes, percussion, keyboards
Willem Ennes: keyboards, backing vocals
Hans Waterman: drums
Guus Willemse: bass guitar, lead vocals

Produced by Solution
Recorded at Spitsbergen Studio, the Netherlands
Mixed at Moonlight Studio, England
Engineers: Phill Dunne, JanWillem Ludolf and Maarten DeBoer

Special thanks to Jan Akkerman for playing guitar on "Logic"
and to Nippy Noya for playing percussion on "It's Only Just Begun", "Captain Willie", "Logic" and "Mirror"
