= Solution (band) =

Dutch progressive rock band

Solution were a Dutch progressive rock band that existed from 1970 to 1983, during which time they released six studio albums and one live album. They incorporated jazz, rock, pop and soul influences, becoming more commercial on their fifth and sixth albums.

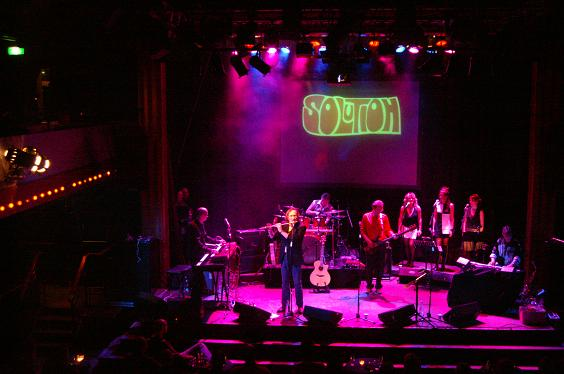
Reunion concert in 2006

== History ==
Their first eponymous LP comprised mainly instrumental pieces, complex yet repetitive in structure, with bassist Peter van der Sande singing on one track. He was succeeded by Guus Willemse around the time of its release, and immediately the band began recording more vocal songs; three of the tracks on second album Divergence featured lyrics.

The third album Cordon Bleu (1975) was released on Elton John's own label named The Rocket Record Company, as was its follow-up Fully Interlocking (1977). Both albums were produced by John's producer Gus Dudgeon, and featured a crisper sound and more concise songwriting.

Despite some criticism for a more commercial direction, the next two albums, It's Only Just Begun (1980) and Runaway (1982) continued this trend. The two title tracks from these albums became hit singles in Europe.

Solution split in 1983, playing a final concert at Paradiso in Amsterdam and releasing a double live album. They regrouped in March 2006 for two concerts at Panama, Amsterdam (released as a DVD in July 2007), while a triple CD compilation (The Ultimate Collection, comprising almost every track they released) was issued in 2005. Also, a 1976 pairing of Solution and Divergence (simply titled Solution) was reissued by EMI in February 2007, featuring "Fever" (left off the original CD edition) and "Divergence", the studio version of which was omitted from The Ultimate Collection in favour of the 1983 live recording.

== Members ==
Band members:

- Tom Barlage - saxophone, flute
- Willem Ennes - piano, organ, keyboards
- Hans Waterman - drums
- Guus Willemse (named Gus on "It's Only Just Begun" and "Runaway") - bass guitar, vocals

Former member:

- Peter van der Sande - bass guitar, vocals on "Solution" (replaced by Guus Willemse)

Guest members:

- Jan Akkerman - guitar on "Logic" from the album It's Only Just Begun
- Steve Boston - congas on "Solution"
- Jim Capaldi - vocals on "Runaway"
- Arthur Clarck - bass guitar
- Jaap van Eik - bass guitar
- Frankie Fish - backing vocals on "Cordon Bleu"
- Harry Hardholt- guitar
- Adri Klöne - bass guitar
- Kaz Lux - vocals
- Nippy Noya - percussion on "It's Only Just Begun"
- Michiel Pos - vocals, acoustic guitars, flute on "Cordon Bleu"
- John Schuursma - guitar

== Albums ==
- Solution (1971)
- Divergence (1972)
- Cordon Bleu (1975)
- Fully Interlocking (1977)
- ...It's Only Just Begun... (1980)
- Runaway (1982)
- Solution Live (1983)
- Reunionconcert Solution (DVD, 2006)

== Reissues ==
- Solution (1976 - actually a double repackage of the first two albums)
- The Best of Solution Live (1991)
- The Ultimate Collection (2005)
- Solution (1971) on Esoteric Records (2012)
- Divergence (1972) on Esoteric Records (2012)
- Solution Reunion 2006 (DVD)(2006) on Solutionmusic (2007)
- Mythology (Remastered Solution/Divergence/Cordon Bleu/Fully Interlocking + bonus tracks) on Pseudonym Records (2012)

== Singles ==
- "Divergence" (EMI, 1973)
- "A Song for You" (Rocket Records, 1975)
- "Chappaqua" (Rocket Records, 1976)
- "Give Some More" (Rocket Records, 1977/78)
- "Empty Faces" (Rocket Records, 1977)
- "On My Own" (CBS, 1980)
- "It's Only Just Begun" (CBS, 1980)
- "Runaway" (CBS, 1982)
- "Downhearted" (CBS, 1982)
- "Bad Breaks" (SKY, 1983 - from Solution Live)
