= Waltz Across Texas =

1982 film by Ernest Day

- Directed by: Ernest Day
- Written by: Bill Svanoe
- Story by: Anne Archer; Terry Jastrow
- Produced by: Martin Jurow; Scott M. Rosenfelt
- Starring: Anne Archer; Terry Jastrow
- Cinematography: Robert Elswit
- Edited by: Jay Cassidy
- Music by: Steve Dorff
- Distributed by: Atlantic Releasing Corporation
- Release date: October 1982
- Running time: 99 minutes
- Country: United States
- Language: English
- Budget: $4.5 million

Waltz Across Texas is a 1982 American drama film directed by Ernest Day and starring Anne Archer and Terry Jastrow, who were married.

== Plot ==
A headstrong young oilman and a beautiful geologist clash wills on the trail of Texas crude. The first meeting between John Taylor— a down-home, intuitive Texan whose expertise lies in guessing where petroleum is located — and feisty Gail Weston— who, as a geologist, is not in the habit of guessing — is hardly promising. So when their first drilling site turns up dry, Gail packs up and heads north, but the lure of oil discovery is strong and soon she finds herself in partnership with John on their own wildcat well. Amid the breathtaking beauty of Midland, Texas, they share a unique quest...and a tender love affair.

== Cast ==
- Anne Archer as Gail Weston
- Terry Jastrow as John Taylor
- Richard Farnsworth as Frank Walker
- Noah Beery Jr. as Joe Locker
- Mary Kay Place as Kit Peabody
- Josh Taylor as Like Jarvis
- Ben Piazza as Bll Wrather

== Reception ==
Leonard Maltin gave the film two and a half stars, calling it, "Predictable, but far from unpleasant."
