= Cordon Bleu (album) =

Studio album by Solution
- Released: December 2, 1975
- Recorded: Rockfield Studios, Wales
- Genre: Symphonic rock
- Length: 42:45
- Label: The Rocket Record Company
- Producer: Gus Dudgeon

Solution chronology
Divergence (1972)	Cordon Bleu (1975)	Fully Interlocking (1977)

Cordon Bleu is the third album by the Dutch symphonic rock group Solution. It was released in 1975 on Elton John's label, The Rocket Record Company.

== History ==
Recorded at Rockfield Studios in Monmouth, Wales, Cordon Bleu featured the main quartet of Willem Ennes, Tom Barlage, Guus Willemse and Hans Waterman complemented by Chiel Pos. Pos contributed acoustic guitar to "Last Detail" and tenor sax to "Third Line" and "Whirligig", while Frankie Fish co-wrote some lyrics and also, together with Pos, added backing vocals.

Like its predecessor Divergence (1972), Cordon Bleu mixed long instrumental pieces ("Chappaqua" and "Whirligig") with shorter vocal songs which also featured instrumental passages ("Third Line", "Last Detail" and "Black Pearl"). "A Song for You" is the shortest song on the album, and is a more conventional pop song. This was released as a single in Europe, with an edited version of "Chappaqua" as the B-side. "Chappaqua" was issued as an A-side in its own right in some territories (backed by "Whirligig"), and was a B-side again to "Give Some More" in 1977/78.

Produced by Elton John's producer Gus Dudgeon, the album had a crisper sound than Solution and Divergence. This trend was continued on the following album Fully Interlocking (1977), also produced by Dudgeon.

Cordon Bleu charted in the Netherlands on 20 December 1975, reaching #18 and spending 11 weeks on the chart.

First released on vinyl and cassette, it was later reissued by CBS in 1980 and on Compact Disc in 1988. In 2006, "Chappaqua", "Whirligig" and "Third Line" were included on the compilation The Ultimate Collection, with versions of the other three tracks featured on the live disc.

== Track listing ==
1. "Chappaqua" (10:33)
  - Music by Tom, Willem & Hans
2. "Third Line Part 1" (1:38)
  - Music by Tom, Willem & Guus
  - Words by Michiel & Frankie
3. "Part 2" (5:44)
  - Music by Tom, Willem & Hans
4. "A Song for You" (3:53)
  - Music by Guus
  - Words by Guus & Frankie
5. "Whirligig" (9:00)
  - Music by Tom, Willem & Guus
6. "Last Detail Part 1" (2:48)
  - Music by Tom, Willem & Guus
  - Words by Michiel & Frankie
7. "Part 2" (2:41)
  - Music by Tom, Willem, Hans & Guus
8. "Black Pearl Part 1" (1:14)
  - Music by Tom, Guus & Michiel
  - Words by Frankie
9. "Part 2" (5:01)
  - Music by Tom & Willem

== Personnel ==
- Tom Barlage – alto sax, soprano sax, flute, percussion
- Willem Ennes – electric piano, acoustic piano, organ, Elka Rhapsody
- Guus Willemse – bass guitar, lead vocals, electric guitar
- Hans Waterman – drums
- All backing vocals by Tom, Guus and Frankie Fish.
- Michiel Pos – additional tenor saxophone on "Third Line" and "Whirligig" and acoustic guitar on "Last Detail"

Produced by Gus Dudgeon.
Recorded at Rockfield Studios in Wales.
Engineers: Pat Moran & Phil Dunne.
Remixed at Marquee Studios in London.
Engineers: Steve Holroyd & Gus Dudgeon.
Sleeve design & photography by Hipgnosis
Lettering by Richard Evans.
