= Outrider (album) =

- Cover photography by Peter Ashworth

Studio album by Jimmy Page
- Released: 20 June 1988
- Recorded: Early 1987
- Studios: The Sol, Cookham, Berkshire, England
- Genres: Blues rock; instrumental rock; hard rock
- Length: 39:50
- Label: Geffen
- Producer: Jimmy Page

Jimmy Page chronology
Mean Business (1986)	Outrider (1988)	Coverdale–Page (1993)

Singles from Outrider
- 1. "Wasting My Time" Released: June 25, 1988; 2. "The Only One" Released: July 1988; 3. "Prison Blues" Released: September 1988

Outrider is the debut solo studio album by the English musician Jimmy Page, released on 20 June 1988 by Geffen Records. It is his first time since 1969 he recorded with a record label other than Atlantic Records/Swan Song Records. Page recorded the music at his personal studio The Sol. Robert Plant guests on one track, "The Only One", while John Bonham's son Jason plays drums.

This was originally intended to be a two-album release. However, during the early recording stages of this album, Page's house was broken into and amongst the items stolen were the demo tapes which had been recorded up to that point. Page did not record any demos prior to recording the album itself.

== Reception ==
Professional ratings
Review scores
Source	Rating
AllMusic	2/5 stars
Chicago Tribune	Unfavorable
Collector's Guide to Heavy Metal	4/10
Kerrang!	5/5 stars
Rolling Stone	2/5 stars
Spin	Favorable

The album reached No. 26 on the Billboard 200 chart, also peaking at No. 27 on the UK Album Chart. The Globe and Mail determined that "Outrider is a mixed bag, ripe with snakelike blues riffs and Page's impeccable use of textures, but hampered by mediocre songwriting."

Years later, Jimmy Page reflected on the album in rather positive terms:

Outrider's all right. It's demo-like compared with those overproduced albums that came out at the time. It didn't do very well—doesn't matter—but I did tour. I was playing music on that tour going right back to The Yardbirds. Jason [Bonham] was the drummer on that tour.

== Track listing ==
Side one
No.	Title	Writer(s)	Lead vocals	Length
1.	"Wasting My Time"	Page, John Miles	John Miles	4:28
2.	"Wanna Make Love"	Page, Miles	John Miles	5:20
3.	"Writes of Winter"	Page	Instrumental	3:27
4.	"The Only One"	Page, Robert Plant	Robert Plant	4:27
5.	"Liquid Mercury"	Page	Instrumental	3:04

Side two
No.	Title	Writer(s)	Lead vocals	Length
6.	"Hummingbird"	Leon Russell	Chris Farlowe	5:22
7.	"Emerald Eyes"	Page	Instrumental	3:20
8.	"Prison Blues"	Page, Chris Farlowe	Chris Farlowe	7:10
9.	"Blues Anthem (If I Cannot Have Your Love...)"	Page, Farlowe	Chris Farlowe	3:24

== Personnel ==
Musicians

- Jimmy Page – guitars, synthesizer, backing vocals, production
- Tony Franklin – bass guitar on track 1
- Felix Krish – bass guitar on tracks 4, 5 and 7–9
- Durban Laverde – bass guitar on tracks 2, 3 and 6
- Chris Farlowe – lead vocals on tracks 6, 8 and 9
- John Miles – lead vocals on tracks 1 and 2
- Robert Plant – lead vocals on track 4
- Barriemore Barlow – drums, percussion on tracks 5 and 7
- Jason Bonham – drums, percussion on tracks 1–4, 6 and 8–9

Technical

- Peter Ashworth – photography
- Dick Beetham – assistant engineering
- Steve Hoyland – assistant engineering
- JL – artwork and cover co-ordination
- George Marino – mastering at Sterling Sound, New York
- Leif Mases – engineering, mixing

== Charts ==
Chart (1988)	Peak position
Australian Albums (ARIA)	25
Canada Top Albums/CDs (RPM)	25
Finnish Albums (The Official Finnish Charts)	12
German Albums (Offizielle Top 100)	50
Italian Albums (Musica e Dischi)	22
New Zealand Albums (RMNZ)	22
Swedish Albums (Sverigetopplistan)	28
UK Albums (Official Charts)	27
US Billboard 200	26

=== Singles ===
Title	Peak chart positions
Title	US Main
Wasting My Time	4
The Only One	13
Prison Blues	26

== Certifications ==
Region	Certification	Certified units/sales
United States (RIAA)	Gold	500,000^{^}
^{^} Shipments figures based on certification alone.

== Accolades ==
Publication	Country	Accolade	Year	Rank
Kerrang!	UK	Albums of 1988	1988	16

== Tour ==
Date	City	Country	Venue
2 September 1988	Miami	United States	Miami Arena
6 September 1988	Atlanta	United States	The Omni
8 September 1988	Miami	United States	James L. Knight Center
9 September 1988	Tampa	United States	USF Sun Dome
11 September 1988	Houston	United States	The Summit
14 September 1988	Austin	United States	Frank Erwin Center
16 September 1988	El Paso	United States	UTEP Special Events Center
17 September 1988	Mesa	United States	Mesa Amphitheatre
23 September 1988	Dallas	United States	Coca-Cola Starplex
24 September 1988	New Orleans	United States	Municipal Auditorium
7 October 1988	Los Angeles	United States	LA Forum
8 October 1988	San Diego	United States	SDSU State Theatre
11 October 1988	Oakland	United States	Oakland-Alameda County Coliseum Arena
14 October 1988	Kansas City	United States	Memorial Hall
16 October 1988	Bloomington	United States	Met Center
17 October 1988	Chicago	United States	UIC Pavilion
19 October 1988	Cleveland	United States	Public Auditorium
21 October 1988	Dayton	United States	Hara Arena
22 October 1988	Detroit	United States	Joe-Louis Arena
25 October 1988	Rochester	United States	Rochester Arena War Memorial
26 October 1988	East Rutherford	United States	Brendan Byrne Arena
28 October 1988	Uniondale	United States	Nassau Colisuem
29 October 1988	Worcester	United States	Worcester Centrum
30 October 1988	Philadelphia	United States	The Spectrum
3 November 1988	New Haven	United States	Veterans Memorial Coliseum
4 November 1988	Syracuse	United States	Onondaga War Memorial Auditorium
5 November 1988	Troy	United States	RPI Fieldhouse
8 November 1988	Landover	United States	Capital Center
9 November 1988	Pittsburgh	United States	Syria Mosque
11 November 1988	Portland	United States	Cumberland County Civic Center
12 November 1988	New York	United States	The Ritz
13 November 1988	New York	United States	The Ritz
UK
21 November 1988	Birmingham	United Kingdom	The Hummingbird
23 November 1988	Newcastle	United Kingdom	Newcastle City Hall
24 November 1988	London	United Kingdom	Hammersmith Odeon
25 November 1988	London	United Kingdom	Hammersmith Odeon
26 November 1988	Manchester	United Kingdom	Manchester Apollo

== See also ==
- Celebration Day
- The Honeydrippers
- Page and Plant
