= Gerald A. Browne =

American author and editor (1924–2015)

Gerald Austin Browne (November 29, 1924 – July 24, 2015) was an American author and editor.

== Biography ==
Browne was born on November 29, 1924, and raised in Litchfield County, Connecticut. He attended the University of New Mexico, The University of Paris and Columbia University, where he won several literary awards. His first novel, It's All Zoo, was written while he was living in Paris and working as a fashion photographer. His bestselling novels include 11 Harrowhouse Street, Green Ice, 19 Purchase Street, Stone 588, and Hot Siberian, several of which have been made into movies.

Browne lived in San Diego, California with his wife, Merle, a model and actress, as well as co-author of their novel entitled The Ravishers. He died on July 24, 2015, at the age of 90.

== Works ==
- It's All Zoo (1968).
- The Ravishers (1970) Published as authored by Merle Lynn Browne, reissued in paperback in 1989 as authored by Gerald A. Browne.
- 11 Harrowhouse Street (1972).
- Hazard (1973).
- The Arousers (1974) Published as authored by Merle Lynn Browne, reissued in paperback in 1989 as authored by Gerald A. Browne.
- Slide (1976).
- Green Ice (1978).
- 19 Purchase Street (1982).
- Stone 588 (1986).
- Hot Siberian (1989)
- 18mm Blues (1993) (published also as Blue Pearls).
- West 47th (1996).
