= Bill Wyman =

English rock musician (born 1936)

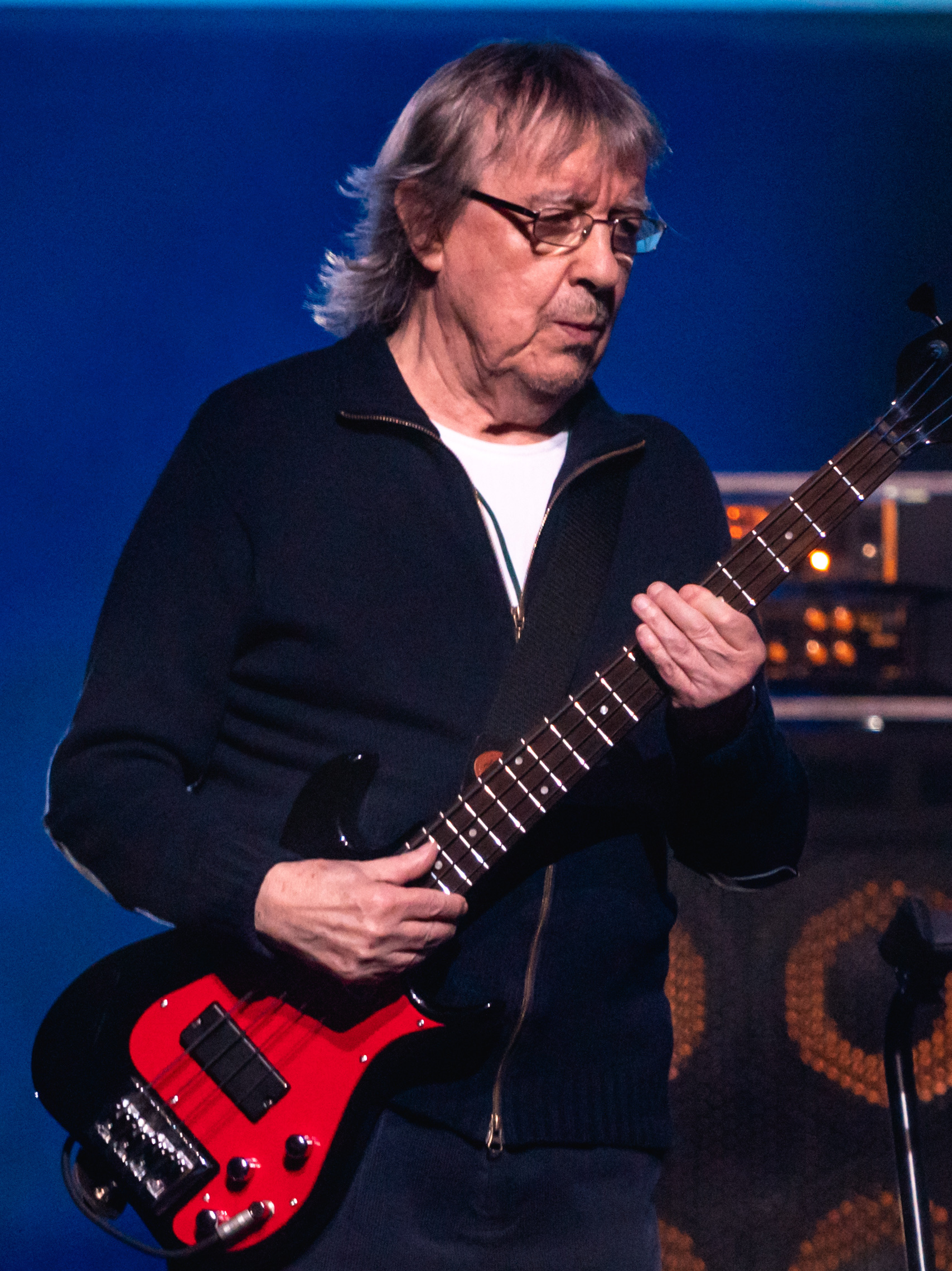
- Wyman in 2020

Background information
- Born: William George Perks; 24 October 1936 (age 90); Lewisham, London, England
- Genres: Rock; blues; jazz
- Occupations: Musician; songwriter; singer; photographer
- Instruments: Bass guitar; vocals; keyboards; guitar
- Years active: 1959–1993; 1997–present
- Labels: Velvel; Koch; Rolling Stones; Atlantic; A&M; Proper; BMG
- Formerly of: The Rolling Stones; Bill Wyman's Rhythm Kings; Willie and the Poor Boys; The Cliftons
- Spouse(s): Diane Cory (m. 1959; div. 1969) Mandy Smith (m. 1989; div. 1993) Suzanne Accosta (m. 1993)
- Website: billwyman.com

William George Wyman (né Perks; born 24 October 1936) is an English musician who was the bassist of the rock band the Rolling Stones from 1962 to 1993. Wyman was part of the band's first stable lineup and performed on their first 19 studio albums. After his departure, he occasionally took part in live performances with the Rolling Stones and recorded with them in 2023. He also performed as a backing vocalist and bassist for the blues rock band Bill Wyman's Rhythm Kings from 1997 to 2018. Wyman was inducted into the Rock and Roll Hall of Fame as a member of the Rolling Stones in 1989.

== Early life ==
Wyman was born William George Perks on 24 October 1936 at Lewisham Hospital in Lewisham, South London, the first son of bricklayer William George Perks and Kathleen May "Molly" Perks (née Jeffery). One of six children, he spent most of his early life in Penge, South East London, but was briefly evacuated to Mansfield Woodhouse, with his mother and siblings but, because of his truanting, was sent back to London to live with his grandmother at age five. Wyman described his wartime childhood as "scarred by poverty", having survived The Blitz and enemy fighter plane strafing that killed neighbours.

Wyman attended Oakfield Primary School and with coaching from his maternal grandmother, Florence French (including piano lessons and gaining a pass in Grades 1 and 2), he passed his Eleven-plus exam and gained entry to Beckenham and Penge County Grammar School from 1947 to Easter 1953. He left school before the General Certificate of Education examinations as his father had found him a job working for a bookmaker. His father insisted that he take the job despite his headmaster begging in writing that Wyman return to take his exams.

In January 1955, Wyman was called up for two years national service in the Royal Air Force (RAF). In the autumn, after signing for an extra year, he was posted to Oldenburg Air Base in Lower Saxony, West Germany, where he spent the rest of his service in the Motor Transport Section. He heard the beginnings of rock and roll at dance halls such as "Zum Grünen Wald" and, after purchasing a radio, on American Forces Network (AFN). In August 1956, he bought a classical guitar for 400 Deutsche Mark and in 1957 formed a skiffle group on camp with Casey Jones, in which he played a tea chest bass that he built himself.

== Music career ==
Wyman took piano lessons from age 10 to 13. A year after his marriage on 24 October 1959 to Diane Cory, an 18-year-old bank clerk from Sydenham, London, he bought a Burns electric guitar for £52 (equivalent to £1,042 in 2025) on hire purchase, but was not satisfied by his progress. He switched to bass guitar after hearing one at a concert by the Barron Knights. He created an electric fretless bass guitar by removing the frets on a second hand UK-built Dallas Tuxedo bass and played this in a south London band, the Cliftons, in 1961.

He legally changed his surname to Wyman by Deed poll in August 1964, taking the phonetic surname of a friend, Lee Whyman, with whom he had done national service in the Royal Air Force from 1955 to 1957.

=== The Rolling Stones and 1980s side projects ===
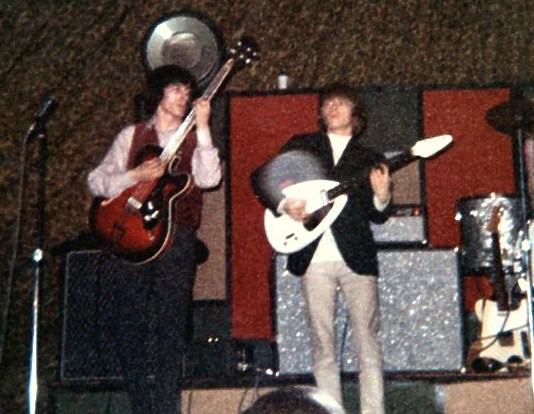
Wyman (left) with Brian Jones (right) performing at Georgia Southern College in 1965

When drummer Tony Chapman told Wyman that a rhythm and blues band called the Rolling Stones needed a bassist, he auditioned at a pub in Chelsea, London, on 7 December 1962 and was hired as a successor to Dick Taylor. The band were impressed by his instrument and amplifiers (one of which Wyman modified himself, and a Vox AC30). Wyman was the oldest member of the group.

In addition to playing bass guitar, Wyman frequently provided backing vocals on their early records, and through 1967, in concert as well. He wrote and sang lead on the track "In Another Land" from their sixth studio album Their Satanic Majesties Request, which was released as a single and credited solely to Wyman, making it his first official solo single. The song is one of two Wyman compositions released by the Rolling Stones; the second is "Downtown Suzie" (sung by Mick Jagger), on Metamorphosis (1975), a compilation album of Rolling Stones outtakes. The title "Downtown Suzie" was chosen by their erstwhile manager Allen Klein without consulting Wyman or the band. The original title was "Sweet Lisle Lucy", named after Lisle Street, a street in the red-light district in Soho, London.

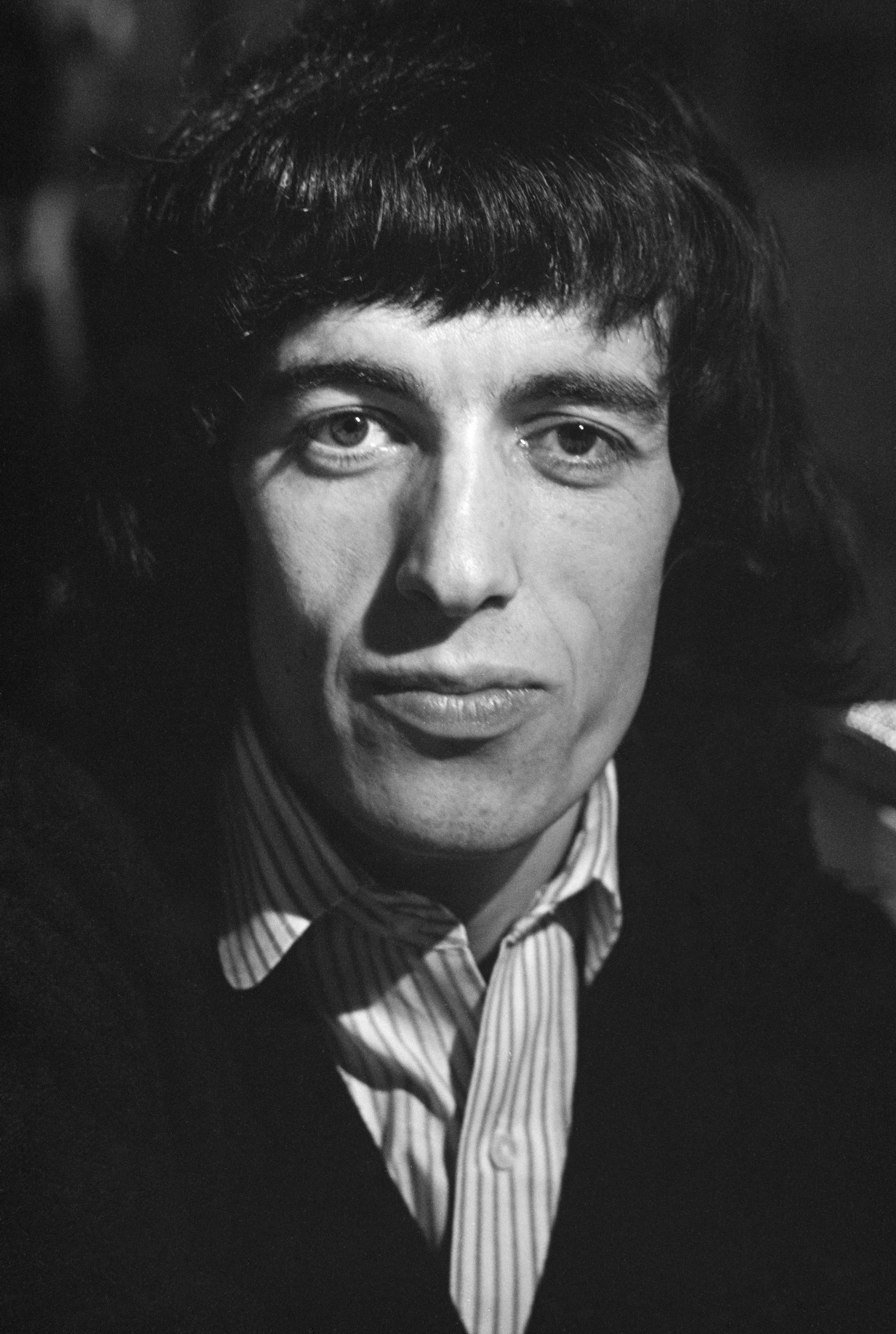
Wyman at a press conference in Turku, Southwest Finland, 1965

Wyman was close to Brian Jones; they usually shared rooms while on tour and often went to clubs together. He and Jones spent time together even when Jones was distancing himself from the band. Wyman was distraught when he heard the news of Jones' death, being one of two members (Charlie Watts was the other) to attend Jones' funeral in July 1969. Wyman was also friends with guitarist Mick Taylor. Like the other Rolling Stones, he has worked with Taylor since the latter's departure from the band in 1974.

Wyman has kept a journal throughout his life, beginning as a child, and used it in writing his 1990 autobiography Stone Alone and his 2002 book Rolling with the Stones. In Stone Alone, Wyman says he wrote the riff of "Jumpin' Jack Flash" with Jones and Watts. Wyman mentions that "(I Can't Get No) Satisfaction" was released as a single only after a 3–2 vote within the band: Wyman, Watts and Jones voted for, Jagger and Keith Richards against, feeling it not sufficiently commercial.

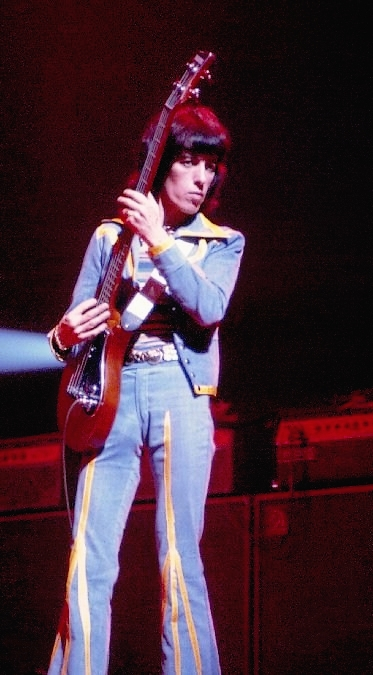
Wyman performing with the Rolling Stones in Chicago, Illinois, 1975

Wyman also played on The London Howlin' Wolf Sessions, released 1971, with Watts, Howlin' Wolf, Eric Clapton, and Steve Winwood, and on the studio album Jamming with Edward!, released in 1972, with Ry Cooder, Nicky Hopkins, Jagger and Watts. He played bass guitar on at least two tracks on John P. Hammond's studio album I Can Tell (1967).

In July 1981, Wyman's solo single "(Si Si) Je Suis un Rock Star" became a top-20 hit in many countries. Also in 1981, Wyman composed the soundtrack album Green Ice for the film of the same name, starring Ryan O'Neal and Omar Sharif. In the mid-1980s, he composed music for two films by the Italian director Dario Argento: Phenomena (1985) and Opera (1987).

In 1983, Wyman helped organise a fundraiser for Action Research into Multiple Sclerosis in the form of a concert tour with a group calling themselves Willie and the Poor Boys. The group played shows in the US and the UK that included a rotating group of guest musicians, including Eric Clapton, Jeff Beck, and Jimmy Page. The effort was inspired by Wyman's friend and former Small Faces and Faces musician Ronnie Lane. The group produced an album of the same name that lists Wyman, Charlie Watts, Geraint Watkins, Mickey Gee, and Andy Fairweather Low as principal members, plus Ray Cooper, Jimmy Page, Willie Garnett, Chris Rea, Steve Gregory, Paul Rodgers, Kenney Jones, Henry Spinetti, and Terry Williams.

In February 1986, Wyman alleged to author Bill German that Jagger tried several times to throw him out of the band. German chose not to report this in his Beggars Banquet newsletter given the poor state of relations within the band.

Wyman made a cameo appearance in the British black comedy film Eat the Rich (1987). He produced and played on a few albums by the British hard rock band Tucky Buzzard.

Following the Rolling Stones' 1989–90 Steel Wheels/Urban Jungle Tours, Wyman left the band in January 1993. The Rolling Stones have continued to record and tour with Darryl Jones on bass guitar, but not as an official member of the band.

=== Later activity ===
Wyman formed the cross-generational blues rock band Bill Wyman's Rhythm Kings in 1997. The band featured a regularly rotating line-up of musicians and performed cover versions of blues, soul, rock and roll, jazz, and occasional Rolling Stones songs. Wyman rarely performed vocals, but typically sang lead vocals on Chuck Berry's 1964 song "You Never Can Tell" and the Rolling Stones' 1969 song "Honky Tonk Women".

Wyman was a judge for the 5th annual Independent Music Awards to support independent artists' careers.

On 25 October 2009, Wyman performed a reunion show with Faces, filling in for the late Ronnie Lane as he had previously done in 1986 and 1993.

On 19 April 2011, pianist Ben Waters released an Ian Stewart tribute album titled Boogie 4 Stu. Wyman played on two tracks: "Rooming House Boogie" and "Watchin' the River Flow", the latter recorded with the Rolling Stones.

In 2012, Wyman and Mick Taylor were expected to join the Rolling Stones on stage at shows in London (25 and 29 November) and Newark, New Jersey (13 and 15 December), though Darryl Jones supplied the bass guitar for the majority of the show. At the London shows on 25 and 29 November, Wyman played on two back-to-back songs, "It's Only Rock 'n Roll (But I Like It)" and "Honky Tonk Women". He later stated that he was not interested in joining the band for further tour dates in 2013.

Wyman participated in a 2019 documentary, directed and written by Oliver Murray, titled The Quiet One, about his life and career.

Wyman briefly returned to recording with the Rolling Stones in 2023, playing bass guitar on one track, "Live By the Sword", on their twenty-fourth studio album Hackney Diamonds. It was the first time he had appeared on a Rolling Stones studio recording since 1991.

On 9 August 2024, Wyman released his ninth solo studio album titled Drive My Car.

== Musical instruments ==
Wyman's bass guitar sound came not only from his 30-inch short-scale fretless bass (the so-called "homemade" bass guitar; actually a modified Dallas Tuxedo bass), but also from the "walking bass" style he adopted, inspired by Willie Dixon and Ricky Fenson. Wyman has played a number of bass guitars, nearly all short scale, including a Framus Star bass and a number of other Framus basses, a Vox Mark III bass (issued as a Bill Wyman signature model), a Fender Mustang Bass, two Ampeg Dan Armstrong bass guitars, a Gibson EB-3, and a Travis Bean bass. Since the late 1980s, Wyman has primarily played Steinberger bass guitars. In 2011, The Bass Centre in London issued the Wyman Bass, a fretted interpretation of Wyman's first "homemade" fretless bass, played and endorsed by Wyman. One of Wyman's basses, his 1969 Fender Mustang Bass, sold at auction for $380,000 in 2020, at the time the highest price ever for a bass guitar.

== Other work ==
Wyman started selling metal detectors in 2007. Treasure-detecting adventures in the British Isles are detailed in his 2005 illustrated book, Treasure Islands, co-written with Richard Havers.

Wyman is a photographer who has taken photographs throughout his career, and in June 2010 he launched a retrospective of his work in an exhibition in Saint-Paul-de-Vence. The exhibition included images of his musical and artistic acquaintances from southern France including Marc Chagall. In 2013, the Rook & Raven Gallery in Fitzrovia, London hosted an exhibition of a selection of Wyman's images which had been reworked by artists including Gerald Scarfe.

== Personal life ==
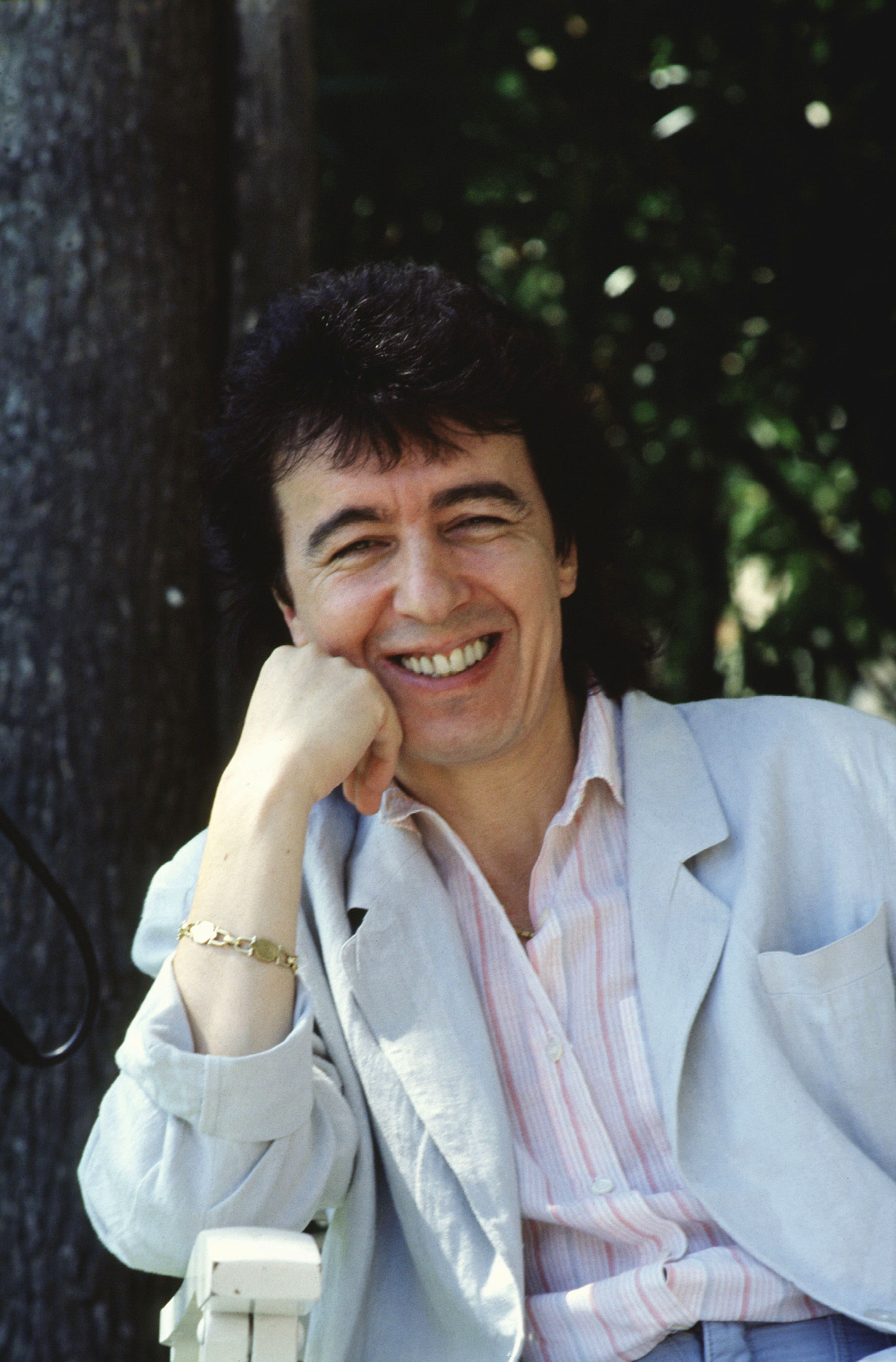
Wyman in 1989

Though moderate in his use of alcohol and drugs, Wyman has said he became "girl mad" as a psychological crutch, particularly following the death of his grandmother Florence in 1961.

He married his first wife, Diane Cory, in 1959. A son was born on 29 March 1962. They separated in 1967 and when they divorced in 1969, the judge awarded him sole custody of their son Stephen, due in part to his wife relocating to South Africa.

In his autobiography Stone Alone (1990), Wyman recalls he and the rest of the band becoming acquainted with a group of women in Adelaide, Australia, on 11 February 1965 during their Far East Tour. Wyman had a brief relationship with one of them, and upon returning the next year on 22 February 1966 during the band's Australasian Tour, found her absent. After asking one of her friends, he was told the woman had become pregnant from their encounter and moved to New Zealand, where she gave birth to a girl she decided to raise on her own, as she did not wish to cause problems for him. Wyman was told that both were living happily and the mother did not contact him when the Stones visited New Zealand a week later. As of the writing of the book, Wyman had not heard from either mother or daughter.

In December 1966, Wyman met Swedish model Astrid Lundström at The Bag O'Nails club in London. The two began a relationship in 1967 and remained together until their separation in 1983, after nearly 17 years together.

On 2 June 1989, aged 52, Wyman married 18-year-old Mandy Smith, whom he had "fallen in love with" when she was 13 and, according to Smith, had a sexual relationship since when she was 14. The couple separated two years later and finalised their divorce two years after that.

In April 1993, Wyman married model Suzanne Accosta, whom he first met in 1980; the two had been friends until their romance developed. They have three daughters.

In 1993, Wyman's son Stephen Wyman married Patsy Smith, the 46-year-old mother of Wyman's ex-wife Mandy Smith. Stephen was 30 years old at the time. Consequently, the ex-Rolling Stone became his own son's ex-son-in-law, the father-in-law of his ex-mother-in-law, as well as the stepgrandfather of his ex-wife.

In 1968, Wyman bought Gedding Hall as his country home near Bury St Edmunds in Suffolk; it dates back to 1458. Wyman also lives in Saint-Paul-de-Vence in southern France where his friends include numerous artists. He is a keen cricket enthusiast and admired multi-sportsman Denis Compton and played in a celebrity match at the Oval against a former England XI, taking a hat-trick. He is a lifelong Crystal Palace F.C. fan, attending his first match as a birthday treat with father William. On a 1990 European tour with the Rolling Stones, he feigned a toothache and said he needed to travel back to London to see a dentist when in fact he went to watch Palace at Wembley Stadium in the 1990 FA Cup final. It was around this period of the Stones' "Steel Wheels" tour he developed his fear of flying.

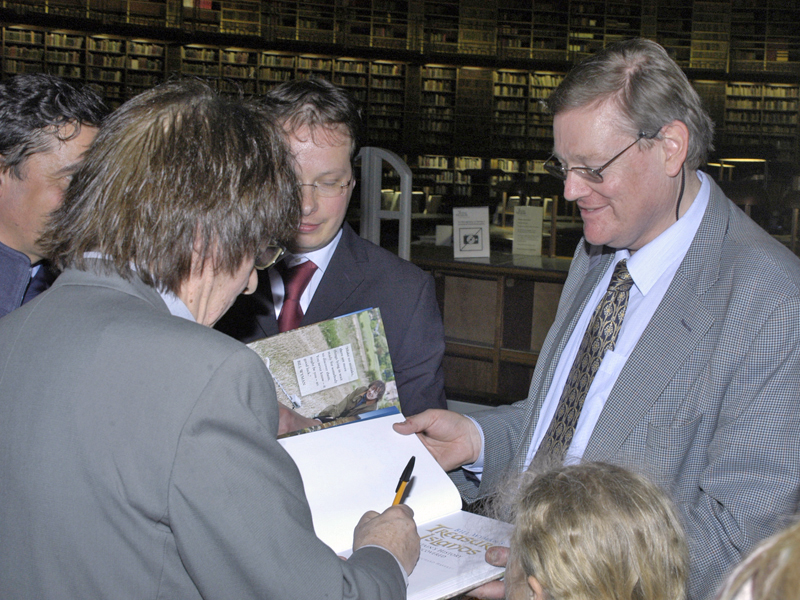
Wyman signing his Treasure Islands book for staff of the British Museum and the Portable Antiquities Scheme in London, 2005

In 2009, Wyman gave up smoking after 55 years.

In March 2016, Wyman was diagnosed with prostate cancer and was expected to make a full recovery.

== Discography ==
=== Albums ===
Studio

- Jamming with Edward! (January 1972) (with Ry Cooder, Nicky Hopkins, Mick Jagger, and Charlie Watts)
- Monkey Grip (May 1974) – UK No. 39
- Stone Alone (March 1976) – US No. 166
- Green Ice (soundtrack) (1981)
- Bill Wyman (April 1982) – UK No. 55
- Willie and the Poor Boys (May 1985) (with Mickey Gee, Andy Fairweather Low, Geraint Watkins, and Charlie Watts)
- Stuff (October 1992)
- Back to Basics (June 2015)
- Drive My Car (August 2024)

Compilation albums

- Bill Wyman's Blues Odyssey (2002)
- A Stone Alone: The Solo Anthology 1974–2002 (2002)

=== Singles ===
- "In Another Land" (December 1967)
- "Monkey Grip Glue" (June 1974)
- "White Lightnin'" (September 1974)
- "A Quarter to Three" (April 1976)
- "If You Wanna Be Happy" (1976)
- "Apache Woman" (1976)
- "(Si Si) Je Suis un Rock Star" (July 1981) – UK No. 14
- "Visions" (1982)
- "Come Back Suzanne" (March 1982) – AUS No. 12
- "A New Fashion" (March 1982) – UK No. 37
- "Baby, Please Don't Go" (June 1985)
- "What & How & If & When & Why" (June 2015)

=== Other appearances ===
Soundtrack contributions

- "Valley", for Phenomena (1985)
- "Opera Theme" and "Black Notes", for Opera (1987) (with Terry Taylor)

Guest appearances

- I Can Tell (1967) (John P. Hammond)
- The London Howlin' Wolf Sessions (1971)
- Manassas (1972)
- Jamming with Edward! (1972)
- Drinkin' TNT 'n' Smokin' Dynamite (1982, recorded live 1974) (Buddy Guy and Junior Wells)

=== Bill Wyman's Rhythm Kings ===
- Struttin' Our Stuff (1997)
- Anyway the Wind Blows (1998)
- Groovin' (2000) – UK No. 52
- Double Bill (2001) – UK No. 88
- Just for a Thrill (2004)

=== With the Rolling Stones ===
- The Rolling Stones / England's Newest Hit Makers (1964)
- The Rolling Stones No. 2 / The Rolling Stones, Now! (1965)
- Out of Our Heads (1965)
- Aftermath (1966)
- Between the Buttons (1967)
- Their Satanic Majesties Request (1967)
- Beggars Banquet (1968)
- Let It Bleed (1969)
- Sticky Fingers (1971)
- Exile on Main St. (1972)
- Goats Head Soup (1973)
- It's Only Rock 'n Roll (1974)
- Black and Blue (1976)
- Some Girls (1978)
- Emotional Rescue (1980)
- Tattoo You (1981)
- Undercover (1983)
- Dirty Work (1986)
- Steel Wheels (1989)
- Hackney Diamonds (2023)

== Written works ==
Bill Wyman has authored or co-authored the following titles:

=== Archaeology ===
- Bill Wyman's Treasure Islands ISBN 0-7509-3967-2

=== The Rolling Stones ===
- Stone Alone ISBN 0-306-80783-1
- A Journey through America with the Rolling Stones. Robert Greenfield. Helter Skelter Publication. ISBN 1-900924-24-2
- Rolling with the Stones ISBN 0-7513-4646-2.
- Bill Wyman's Blues Odyssey ISBN 0-7513-3442-1
- The Stones – A History in Cartoons ISBN 0-7509-4248-7

The last three books and Bill Wyman's Treasure Islands were all written in collaboration with Richard Havers.

=== Art ===
- Wyman Shoots Chagall ISBN 0904351629
