= Solution (Solution album) =

Studio album by Solution
- Released: 1971
- Recorded: May 17–19, 1971
- Labels: Catfish (Netherlands); Decca (UK)
- Producers: John Schuursma and Joop Visser

Solution chronology
Solution (1971)	Divergence (1972)

Solution is the first album by the Dutch symphonic rock group Solution. It was released in 1971 on the Decca label.

== History ==
It is the only Solution album to feature original vocalist and bassist Peter van der Sande, who was replaced by Guus Willemse around the time of the LP release. Van der Sande provides raw vocals on "Phases", while the other four tracks are instrumental. Solution was recorded over three consecutive days in May 1971.

"Koan", "Trane Steps" and "Circus Circumstances" all feature frantic ensemble playing by the band, complemented by the relatively peaceful "Preview". The theme from the latter song would later be incorporated into the codas of "Second Line" and "Third Line" on the subsequent two albums.

"Circus Circumstances" is based on a composition by French composer Jacques Ibert.

In 1976, Solution was coupled with Divergence as a double album, retaining the eponymous title. This pairing was issued by EMI on Compact Disc in 1988 and again in 2007. In 2006, the entirety of the first album was included on The Ultimate Collection.

== Track listing ==
1. "Koan" (7:50)
  - (Barlage/Ennes/Waterman)
2. "Preview" (:51)
  - (Barlage)
3. "Phases" (12:19)
  - (Barlage/Ennes/Waterman/vs Sande)
4. "Trane Steps" (10:19)
  - (Barlage/Ennes/Waterman)
5. "Circus Circumstances" (7:03)
  - (Ibert/Emmerson/Barlage/Ennes/Waterman)

== Credits ==
Tom Barlage: flute, alto & soprano sax
Willem Ennes: piano, electric piano, organ
Peter v. d. Sande: bass, vocals
Hans Waterman: drums
Steve Boston: congas and cowbell on "Phases"

Produced by John Schuursma and Joop Visser
Engineers: Pierre Geoffroy Chateau and André Hooning
Recorded May 17, 18 and 19 1971 at Bovema's Studio - Heemstede
Photos: Janos Barendsen
