= Stuart Epps =

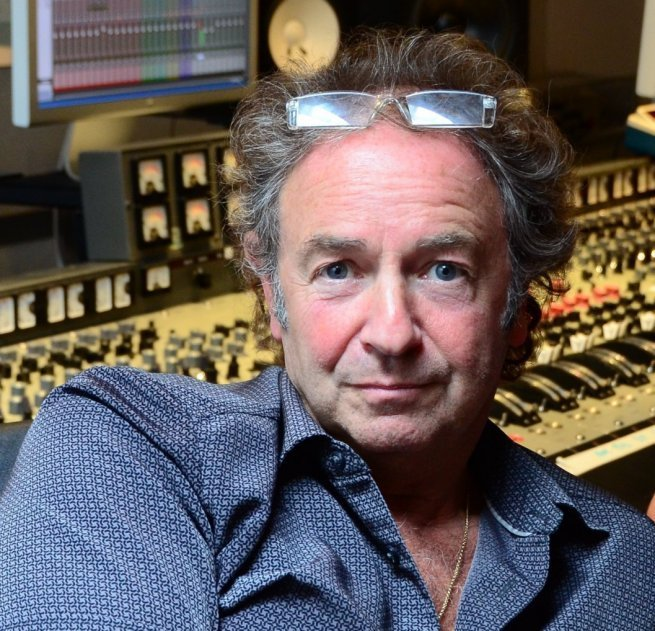

Background information
- Genres: Pop; hard rock; progressive rock; blues rock
- Occupations: Producer, engineer; musician; arranger
- Instruments: Vocals; backing vocals; keyboards; guitar; percussion
- Years active: 1967–present
- Website: stuartepps.co.uk

Stuart Epps is a British record producer and audio engineer.

Since 1967, he has worked with Elton John, Led Zeppelin, Oasis, Twisted Sister, Nine Lies, Bill Wyman, Kiki Dee, George Harrison, Robbie Williams, Mark Owen, Paul Weller, Cliff Richard, Bad Company, Barry White and Chris Rea.

He has contributed to or has been associated with hard rock records by such bands as Twisted Sister, Wishbone Ash, Bad Company, Vandenberg, The Firm, Jagged Edge UK and Shooting Star.

Besides his work with Led Zeppelin, Epps has been involved in other projects with their guitarist Jimmy Page as well as with Rolling Stone member Bill Wyman.

In 2014, Epps co-produced the tracks "Damn" and "Don't Ask If I'm Alone" for Irish rock band Nine Lies' 2015 album, 9 Lies.
