= Terry Taylor (musician) =

English guitarist (born 1948)

- Born: Terence Martin Taylor; 28 August 1948 (age 78)
- Origin: London, England
- Occupations: Guitarist; arranger; songwriter
- Instrument: Guitar
- Formerly of: The End; Tucky Buzzard; The Arrows; Bill Wyman's Rhythm Kings

Terence Martin "Terry" Taylor (born 28 August 1948) is an English guitarist, arranger and songwriter, who started to become known in the latter half of the 1960s as a band member of the group the End, who had a few singles and also a 1969 album release called Introspection. They were produced by Bill Wyman and the album included Charlie Watts playing tabla on the song "Shades of Orange". Taylor was one of the members that then played in the follow-up band Tucky Buzzard, who were produced by Bill Wyman.

== Career ==
In 1979, after the ITV strike caused a curtailment in that year's autumn term schedules, Terry Taylor's guitar tunes "The May Dance" and "Les Trois Enfants", were used as interval tracks as an accompaniment for the schools programmes interval slides.

After Tucky Buzzard broke up, after an introduction by Wyman, Taylor joined the band Arrows for their second television series, The Arrows Show. After the death of Alan Merrill in March 2020, Taylor is now the last surviving member of Arrows.

Taylor co-founded the band Bill Wyman's Rhythm Kings with Wyman in 1997 and was a member until they broke up in 2018.

== Personal life ==
Taylor has one son, Daniel, a result of his relationship with ex-wife Eva Dyrinda Taylor.
