= Global Warming Tour =

2012–14 concert tour by Aerosmith

- Tour by Aerosmith
- Location: North America; South America; Asia; Oceania; Europe
- Associated album: Music from Another Dimension!
- Start date: June 16, 2012
- End date: June 28, 2014
- Legs: 6
- No. of shows: 77

Aerosmith concert chronology
- Back on the Road Tour (2011); Global Warming Tour (2012–14); Let Rock Rule Tour (2014)

The Global Warming Tour, by American hard rock band Aerosmith, included 82 concert performances across North America, Oceania, Asia, Latin America, and Europe.

"It's something so magical," remarked Steven Tyler. "Other people see it. We don't, because we're in the middle of it. This is Aerosmith, man. The second we get up there on stage, it's insane."

Prior to the first leg, the band played a private event for Walmart shareholders. The first leg included 23 performances and lasted from late May through early August 2012.

The second leg included 14 performances in November and December 2012. Before the second leg, the band performed a brief set at the iHeartRadio Music Festival in mid September. Also prior to the second leg, to promote their new album in early November, the band played three nationally televised performances in New York City and did a special performance in front of their old Boston apartment.

The first two legs were held primarily in indoor arenas, with a couple outdoor shows and a few festivals on the first leg, including three in eastern Canada and Milwaukee's Summerfest.

The third leg of the tour ran from late April to mid May 2013 and saw Aerosmith playing their first shows in Australia since 1990, as well as their first shows in New Zealand and the Philippines. On May 30, the band played at the "Boston Strong" charity concert for victims of the Boston Marathon bombing. In July 2013, the band played at the Greenbrier Classic in West Virginia and at Foxwoods Resort Casino in Connecticut. In August 2013, the band performed four concerts in Japan, but their first shows in China and Taiwan were cancelled due to poor ticket sales. The band performed in August at the Harley-Davidson 110th anniversary concert series in Milwaukee. Concerts were planned for Latin America in September and October, including their first shows in Uruguay, Guatemala and El Salvador.

Cheap Trick opened all dates on the first two legs bar a few festivals. The Dead Dasies, featuring Jon Stevens and Richard Fortus, opened the Australia/New Zealand leg. In Argentina and Brazil, Aerosmith toured with Whitesnake, including the Personal Fest in Buenos Aires and at the Monsters of Rock in São Paulo.

The tour promoted Music from Another Dimension!, released on November 6, 2012. In addition to hits and choice album cuts, the band performed four new songs from the album, three of them regularly ("Oh Yeah", "Legendary Child", and "Lover Alot").

On May 5, 2013, the band announced they had cancelled their first show in Jakarta due to safety concerns.

In 2014, Aerosmith played 17 concerts across Europe from May 14 to July 2. The Let Rock Rule Tour was scheduled to follow in July, August, and September 2014 and see Aerosmith play several dates in North America. This tour featured Slash (with Myles Kennedy and the Conspirators) as the opening act. Full details of the tour were announced on April 8, 2014. On May 14, 2014, the band announced that they had cancelled their concert in Istanbul after Turkey declared a three-day mourning for the victims of Soma mine disaster. The July 2, 2014 concert in Kyiv was cancelled due to civil unrest in Ukraine.

== Stage setup ==
The stage was very close to the design of past tours. The main stage, occupying one end of the venue had the classic Aerosmith logo painted on top and two small platforms off to each side. Kramer's drums were at the back, Hamilton and Whitford were on the left side, and Perry was on the right side. The back-up musicians were at the back-left of the stage behind a stack of amps, the order usually went Melanie Taylor (backing vocals), Mindi Abair (saxophone and backing vocals) and Russ Irwin (keyboards and backing vocals). In the middle of the main stage was the catwalk, which ran through nine rows at each venue. At the end of the catwalk was a B-stage, which ran through the tenth row to the sixteenth row. Around the entire stage was a half-meter wide barricade that contained security and a few select fans.

== Performance ==
The show would start with a video playing on the main video screen that was reminiscent of the original opening from The Outer Limits. Near the end of the video, smoke would arise from the end of the B-stage and from the main stage. When the video finished, Kramer, Whitford and Hamilton would kick into the opening song while Tyler and Perry would rise from a trapdoor at the end of the B-stage. For the first song, Tyler and Perry would stay on the B-stage and the rest of the band would stay on the main stage. After the first song finished, Hamilton, Whitford, Tyler and Perry would all go where they pleased. At "What It Takes", Tyler would look for an attractive girl to sing the opening lines, like in most tours. At the encore which was "Dream On" at every date, smoke would again appear from the end of the B-stage and Tyler on a white piano would appear from the same trapdoor as before. The piano had a few blocks beside it used as stairs by Perry and Tyler, as they would walk on top of the piano. They followed with a second encore – "Train Kept A-Rollin'" – and at a few venues, a third encore was even played, either "Mama Kin" or "Chip Away the Stone". When the encores wrapped up, a few cannons fired silver confetti into the audience. After the confetti storm, Tyler would introduce the back-up musicians (Taylor, Abair and Irwin) and the members of Aerosmith. Finally, he would hand the microphone off to Perry, who would introduce Tyler. After the introductions, the band would walk out with "Mannish Boy" by Muddy Waters playing over the speakers.

- Top 200 North American Tours 2012: #23
- Total Gross: US $31 million
- Total Attendance: 306,475 (33 concerts)

== Tour dates ==
Date	City	Country	Venue	Attendance	Box Office
North America
June 16, 2012	Minneapolis	United States	Target Center	—	—
June 19, 2012	Cleveland	United States	Quicken Loans Arena	—	—
June 22, 2012	Chicago	United States	United Center	—	—
June 27, 2012	Toronto	Canada	Air Canada Centre	13,177 / 13,177	$1,598,920
June 29, 2012	Albany	United States	Times Union Center	—	—
July 1, 2012	Uniondale	United States	Nassau Coliseum	—	—
July 5, 2012	Auburn Hills	United States	The Palace of Auburn Hills	—	—
July 7, 2012 (Note: The July 7, 2012 concert in Milwaukee was part of Summerfest.)	Milwaukee	United States	Marcus Amphitheater	—N/a	—N/a
July 10, 2012 (Note: The July 10, 2012 concert in Laval was part of Mondial Loto-Québec.)	Laval	Canada	Centre de la Nature	—N/a	—N/a
July 12, 2012 (Note: The July 12, 2012 concert in Quebec City was part of Festival d'été de Québec.)	Quebec City	Canada	Plains of Abraham	—N/a	—N/a
July 14, 2012 (Note: The July 14, 2012 concert in Grand Falls was part of Salmon Festival.)	Grand Falls	Canada	Centennial Park	—N/a	—N/a
July 17, 2012	Boston	United States	TD Garden	—	—
July 19, 2012	Boston	United States	TD Garden	—	—
July 21, 2012	Philadelphia	United States	Wells Fargo Center	—	—
July 24, 2012	East Rutherford	United States	Izod Center	—	—
July 26, 2012	Atlanta	United States	Philips Arena	13,045 / 13,045	$1,309,188
July 28, 2012	Dallas	United States	American Airlines Center	12,633 / 12,633	$1,391,440
July 30, 2012	Houston	United States	Toyota Center	—	—
August 1, 2012	Denver	United States	Pepsi Center	—	—
August 4, 2012	Oakland	United States	Oracle Arena	11,073 / 12,296	$1,182,915
August 6, 2012	Los Angeles	United States	Hollywood Bowl	—	—
August 8, 2012	Tacoma	United States	Tacoma Dome	13,968 / 13,968	$1,253,120
August 12, 2012	Bristow	United States	Jiffy Lube Live	—	—
November 8, 2012	Oklahoma City	United States	Chesapeake Energy Arena	—	—
November 11, 2012	Wichita	United States	Intrust Bank Arena	—	—
November 14, 2012	Kansas City	United States	Sprint Center	—	—
November 16, 2012	Austin	United States	Frank Erwin Center	8,816 / 11,977	$1,219,161
November 20, 2012	New York City	United States	Madison Square Garden	11,894 / 13,173	$1,014,769
November 23, 2012	Atlantic City	United States	Ovation Hall	—	—
November 25, 2012	Columbus	United States	Nationwide Arena	—	—
November 27, 2012	Toronto	Canada	Air Canada Centre	7,225 / 8,100	$763,809
December 1, 2012	Paradise	United States	MGM Grand Garden Arena	—	—
December 3, 2012	Los Angeles	United States	Staples Center	10,858 / 13,401	$983,992
December 6, 2012	New Orleans	United States	New Orleans Arena	—	—
December 9, 2012	Sunrise	United States	BB&T Center	—	—
December 11, 2012	Tampa	United States	Tampa Bay Times Forum	8,817 / 10,476	$873,223
December 13, 2012	Nashville	United States	Bridgestone Arena	—	—
Australasia
April 20, 2013 (Note: The April 20, 2013 concert in Sydney was part of Stone Music Festival.)	Sydney	Australia	ANZ Stadium	—N/a	—N/a
April 24, 2013	Dunedin	New Zealand	Forsyth Barr Stadium	—	—
April 28, 2013	Melbourne	Australia	Sidney Myer Music Bowl	—	—
May 1, 2013	Brisbane	Australia	Brisbane Entertainment Centre	8,095 / 8,370	$1,044,930
May 4, 2013	Melbourne	Australia	Rod Laver Arena	8,767 / 10,500	$1,539,700
May 8, 2013	Pasay	Philippines	Mall of Asia Arena	—	—
May 25, 2013	Singapore		The Meadow - Gardens by the Bay	—	—
North America
July 6, 2013	Fairlea	United States	West Virginia State Fair Grandstand	—	—
July 10, 2013	Ledyard	United States	MGM Grand Theater	—	—
Asia
August 8, 2013 (Note: The August 8, 2013 concert in Chiba was part of Aerosonic.)	Chiba	Japan	Chiba Marine Stadium	—N/a	—N/a
August 11, 2013	Nagoya	Japan	Nippon Gaishi Hall	—	—
August 14, 2013	Osaka	Japan	Osaka Municipal Central Gymnasium	—	—
August 16, 2013	Osaka	Japan	Osaka Municipal Central Gymnasium	—	—
North/South America
August 30, 2013 (Note: The August 30, 2013 concert in Milwaukee was part of the Harley-Davidson 110th Anniversary event.)	Milwaukee	United States	Marcus Amphitheater	—N/a	—N/a
September 28, 2013	Caracas	Venezuela	Poliedro de Caracas	—	—
October 1, 2013	San José	Costa Rica	Estadio Nacional de Costa Rica	—	—
October 4, 2013	San Salvador	El Salvador	Estadio Jorge "Mágico" González	—	—
October 6, 2013	Guatemala City	Guatemala	Estadio Cementos Progreso	—	—
October 9, 2013	Montevideo	Uruguay	Estadio Centenario	—	—
October 12, 2013 (Note: The October 12, 2013 concert in Buenos Aires was part of Personal Fest.)	Buenos Aires	Argentina	Estadio G.E.B.A.	—N/a	—N/a
October 15, 2013	Curitiba	Brazil	Bioparque	—	—
October 18, 2013	Rio de Janeiro	Brazil	Praça da Apoteose	—	—
October 20, 2013 (Note: The October 20, 2013 concert in Buenos Aires was part of Monsters of Rock.)	São Paulo	Brazil	Anhembi Convention Center	—N/a	—N/a
October 23, 2013	Brasília	Brazil	Estádio Nacional Mané Garrincha	25,759 / 44,320	$1,639,910
October 27, 2013	Mexico City	Mexico	Mexico City Arena	—	—
Europe
May 17, 2014	Sofia	Bulgaria	Lokomotiv Stadium	—	—
May 21, 2014	Vilnius	Lithuania	Siemens Arena	—	—
May 24, 2014	Moscow	Russia	Olimpiyskiy	—	—
May 27, 2014	Saint Petersburg	Russia	SKK Peterburgsky	—	—
May 30, 2014	Helsinki	Finland	Hartwall Arena	—	—
June 1, 2014	Stockholm	Sweden	Tele2 Arena	—	—
June 4, 2014	Kristiansand	Norway	Odderøya	—	—
June 6, 2014	Horsens	Denmark	Horsens Statsfængsel	—	—
June 9, 2014	Berlin	Germany	O_{2} Arena	11,691 / 13,067	$951,607
June 12, 2014 (Note: The June 12, 2014 concert in Łódź was part of Impact Festival.)	Łódź	Poland	Atlas Arena	—N/a	—N/a
June 15, 2014 (Note: The June 15, 2014 concert in Leicestershire was part of Download Festival.)	Leicestershire	England	Donington Park	—N/a	—N/a
June 18, 2014	Dortmund	Germany	Westfalenhallen	—	—
June 21, 2014 (Note: The June 21, 2014 concert in Clisson was part of Hellfest.)	Clisson	France	Val de Moine	—N/a	—N/a
June 25, 2014	Milan	Italy	Fiera Milano	—	—
June 28, 2014 (Note: The June 28, 2014 concert in London was part of Calling Festival.)	London	England	Clapham Common	—N/a	—N/a

== Trivia ==
- Aerosmith premiered six new songs on this tour: "Oh Yeah", "Legendary Child", "What Could Have Been Love", "Lover Alot", "Freedom Fighter" and, in excerpted form only, "Street Jesus".
- Whitford's sons Harrison and Graham guested on "Last Child" at, respectively, the American Airlines Center in Dallas and Madison Square Garden in New York City.
- At the Hollywood Bowl, instead of Tyler and Perry appearing from a trapdoor at the end of the catwalk, Stan Lee introduced the band and Aerosmith simply walked onstage.
- Actor Johnny Depp played rhythm guitar and one solo on "Train Kept A-Rollin'" in Los Angeles at the Hollywood Bowl, and guested on "Come Together" and "Stop Messin' Around" at the Staples Center.
- Sean Lennon, son of John, added vocals on "Come Together" at Madison Square Garden in New York City.
- "Lick and a Promise" got its first play in 24 years on United States soil, the last time being at the Pacific Coast Amphitheater in Costa Mesa on September 15, 1988, on the Permanent Vacation Tour.
- Aerosmith performed a clip of "Woman of the World" in Atlanta at the Phillips Center. The song hadn't been played anywhere since 1974.
- Aerosmith had to reschedule their show in Bristow, Virginia, because of reported voice problems by Tyler. Originally scheduled for July 3, it was moved to August 12. A difficult political situation in Ukraine meant the show in Kyiv was moved from May 21 to July 2, 2014.
- Jesse Sky Kramer joined his father on percussion for many songs at every show.
- This is the first tour where Aerosmith utilised back-up singers other than Russ Irwin.
- Tyler joined Kramer on drums during "Combination" at every date.
- At a few shows, saxophonist and back-up singer Mindi Abair jammed with Kramer during his drum solo.
- On some nights Whitford played guitar and provided backing vocals on "Ain't That a Shame" or "Surrender" with opening act Cheap Trick. On other nights, Tyler would run out during "I Want You to Want Me", play with Trick bassist Tom Petersson and guitarist Rick Nielsen, help sing the chorus, then quickly exit.
- Former Guns N' Roses guitarist Izzy Stradlin guested on "Mama Kin" at the Staples Center in Los Angeles.
- Russ Irwin, Aerosmith keyboardist, occasionally performed the "Abbey Road Medley" (originally by The Beatles) with Cheap Trick during their set.
- At the Sunrise, Florida, show on 12/09, longtime Aerosmith collaborator Richie Supa guested on "Chip Away the Stone".
- On the 11/27 Toronto show, Aerosmith performed "Red House" as an homage to Jimi Hendrix on what would have been his seventieth birthday.
- Before the Melbourne show, Hamilton suffered a chest infection and was flown home. David Hull from the Joe Perry Project was flown in from the United States to play in his place. Hamilton was set to return with the band after the Australian dates.
- "Throughout tonight's two-hour show," noted Classic Rock of June 27's Toronto fixture, "the singer heaps generous praise on his bandmates, and name-checks (rather than hip-checks) Perry so many times that it borders on idolatry… Intoxicating stuff."

== List of songs played ==
Song	Album	Times
"Dream On"	Aerosmith	77
"Mama Kin"	Aerosmith	26
"Walkin’ the Dog" (Rufus Thomas cover)	Aerosmith	18
"Movin' Out"	Aerosmith	15
"Train Kept A-Rollin'" (Tiny Bradshaw cover)	Get Your Wings	34
"Same Old Song and Dance"	Get Your Wings	25
"S.O.S. (Too Bad)"	Get Your Wings	10
"Seasons of Wither"	Get Your Wings	3
"Woman of the World"	Get Your Wings	1
"Walk This Way"	Toys in the Attic	77
"Sweet Emotion"	Toys in the Attic	77
"No More No More"	Toys in the Attic	64
"Toys in the Attic"	Toys in the Attic	32
"Big Ten Inch Record" (Bull Moose Jackson cover)	Toys in the Attic	4
"Last Child"	Rocks	77
"Combination"	Rocks	49
"Rats in the Cellar"	Rocks	14
"Back in the Saddle"	Rocks	9
"Lick and a Promise"	Rocks	1
"Draw the Line"	Draw the Line	36
"Come Together" (The Beatles cover)	Sgt. Pepper's Lonely Hearts Club Band (soundtrack)	60
"Let the Music Do the Talking"	Done with Mirrors	8
"Rag Doll"	Permanent Vacation	56
"Dude (Looks Like a Lady)"	Permanent Vacation	46
"Chip Away the Stone"	Gems	6
"Love in an Elevator"	Pump	77
"What it Takes"	Pump	59
"Janie's Got a Gun"	Pump	20
"F.I.N.E."	Pump	4
"Livin' on the Edge"	Get a Grip	76
"Cryin'"	Get a Grip	52
"Boogie Man"	Get a Grip	39
"Eat the Rich"	Get a Grip	19
"Crazy"	Get a Grip	6
"Falling in Love (Is Hard on the Knees)"	Nine Lives	3
"Pink"	Nine Lives	8
"Full Circle"	Nine Lives	1
"I Don't Want to Miss a Thing"	Armageddon soundtrack	46
"Jaded"	Just Push Play	56
"Beyond Beautiful"	Just Push Play	2
"Stop Messin' Around" (Fleetwood Mac cover)	Honkin' on Bobo	24
"Oh Yeah"	Music from Another Dimension!	76
"Legendary Child"	Music from Another Dimension!	24
"Lover Alot"	Music from Another Dimension!	17
"Freedom Fighter"	Music from Another Dimension!	13
"What Could Have Been Love"	Music from Another Dimension!	2
"Rattlesnake Shake" (Fleetwood Mac cover)	Then Play On	1
"Red House" (Jimi Hendrix cover)	Are You Experienced	1

== Setlist ==
First leg (May to August 2012)
1. "Draw the Line" (switched with "Toys in the Attic" on 07/10)
2. "Love in an Elevator"
3. "Oh Yeah"
4. "Lick and a Promise" (only on 07/21)
5. "Livin' on the Edge"
6. "Cryin' ("Jaded" on 07/05, 07/07, 07/10, 07/12, 07/14, and 07/17)
7. "S.O.S. (Too Bad)" (replaced with "Come Together" later on the tour)
8. "Last Child"
9. Joey Kramer drum solo
10. "Rag Doll" ("Lord of the Thighs" on 07/05, 07/07, and 07/19)
11. "Boogie Man"/ instrumental jam
12. Theme from Peter Gunn (only played on 07/17, 07/19, 07/21, 07/24, 07/26, 07/28, 07/30, 08/01, 08/04, 08/06, 08/08, and 08/12)
13. "Combination"
14. "What It Takes" (When "Stop Messin' Around" entered the set, "What It Takes" was moved later in the night.)
15. "Rattlesnake Shake" (only on 07/21)
16. "No More No More" (switched with "Stop Messin' Around" later on the tour)
17. "Legendary Child"
18. "Rats in the Cellar" ("I Don't Want to Miss a Thing" or "Falling in Love (Is Hard on the Knees)" were also played in this spot.)
19. "Walking the Dog" ("Chip Away the Stone" and "Big Ten Inch Record" were also played here.)
20. Tom Hamilton bass solo
21. "Uncle Salty" (partial) (only played on 08/01)
22. "Sweet Emotion"
23. "Mother Popcorn" (only on 06/19, 07/05, 07/07, 07/10, 07/12, 07/14, and 08/01)
24. "Walk This Way"
25. "Dream On" (On some dates, Steven jammed on "One Way Street" or "You See Me Crying" prior to starting "Dream On".)
26. "Train Kept A-Rollin'"
27. "Mama Kin" (only on a few dates, "Chip Away the Stone" on a few nights as well)
Second leg (September to December 2012)
1. "Mama Kin" (Switched for "Toys in the Attic" on a few dates. Mama Kin was moved into the encores the first time.)
2. "Love in an Elevator"
3. "Jaded" ("Cryin'" on 11/08)
4. "Oh Yeah"
5. "Livin' on the Edge"
6. "What Could Have Been Love" (only performed 11/08 and 11/11)
7. "Movin' Out"
8. "Walkin' the Dog"
9. "Last Child"
10. Drum solo
11. "Rag Doll"
12. "Boogie Man" / instrumental jam
13. "Red House" (only performed on 11/27)
14. "Combination"
15. "Lover Alot"
16. "What It Takes"
17. "No More No More" (dropped later in the tour)
18. "Come Together"
19. "Dude (Looks Like a Lady)"
20. "Mother Popcorn" (only on a few dates)
21. "Home Tonight" (partial) ("You See Me Crying" (partial) on 11/27)
22. "Walk This Way"
23. "Dream On"
24. "Sweet Emotion"

== Personnel ==
Aerosmith

- Steven Tyler – lead vocals, harmonica, percussion, piano
- Joe Perry – guitar, backing vocals, lead vocals, pedal steel guitar, talkbox
- Brad Whitford – guitar, backing vocals
- Tom Hamilton – bass, backing vocals
- Joey Kramer – drums, percussion

Additional musicians

- Russ Irwin – keyboards, backing vocals, percussion, guitar (until 2014-04-08)
- Mindi Abair – saxophones (First leg)
- Melanie Taylor – backing vocals, percussion (First leg)
- Jesse Sky Kramer – percussion
- David Hull – bass (after Tom leaves due to sickness)
- Buck Johnson – keyboards, backing vocals (after Russ Irwin quits the band beginning on 2014-05-17)
