= Tom Hamilton (musician) =

American musician (born 1951)

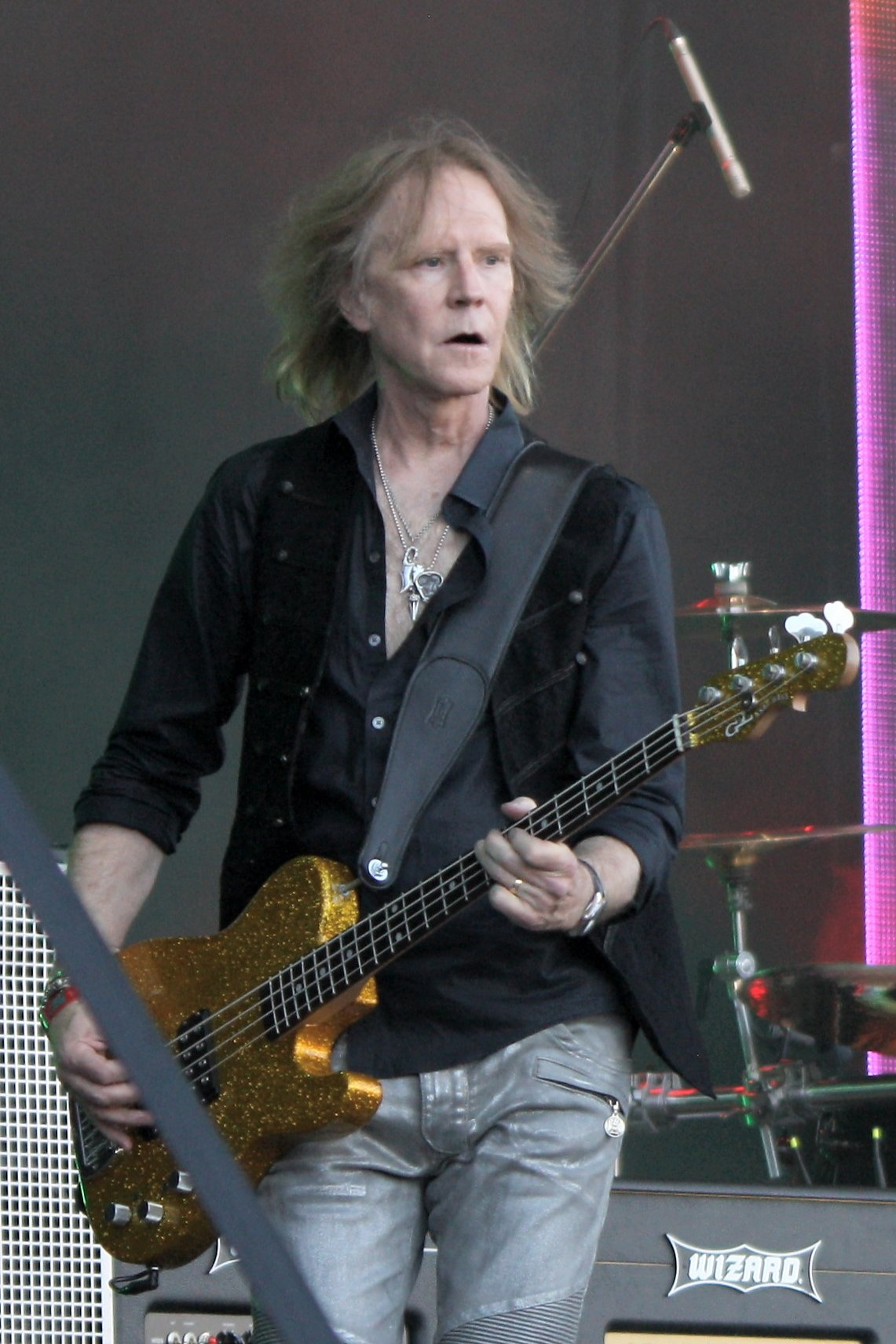
- Hamilton in 2016

Background information
- Born: Thomas William Hamilton; December 31, 1951 (age 74); Colorado Springs, Colorado, U.S.
- Genres: Hard rock; blues rock; rock and roll; glam metal; heavy metal
- Occupations: Musician; songwriter
- Instruments: Bass; guitar
- Years active: 1965–present
- Labels: Columbia; Geffen
- Member of: Aerosmith, Close Enemies
- Formerly of: the Jam Band, Thin Lizzy
- Website: aerosmith.com closeenemiestheband.com

Thomas William Hamilton (born December 31, 1951) is an American musician and songwriter who serves as the bassist for the hard rock bands Aerosmith and Close Enemies. Hamilton has regularly co-written songs for Aerosmith, including two of the band's biggest successes: "Sweet Emotion" (1975) and "Janie's Got a Gun" (1989). Hamilton occasionally plays guitar (e.g. "Uncle Salty", "Sick as a Dog"), sings backing vocals (e.g. "Love in an Elevator") and on rare occasions, lead vocals ("Up On the Mountain"). He was a 2001 inductee in the Rock and Roll Hall of Fame as a member of Aerosmith.

== Early years ==
Hamilton was born to George and Betty Hamilton in Colorado Springs, Colorado. He has an older brother named Scott, an older sister named Perry, and a younger sister named Cecily. His father was a United States Air Force pilot in World War II and his mother was a housewife.

Hamilton initially played guitar and was taught at age 12 by his older brother Scott. He switched to bass when he was 14 due to an open position in a local band. Later, Hamilton was in several bands with future Aerosmith guitarist Joe Perry and David "Pudge" Scott. One of the bands was simply called "The Jam Band." It was at a Jam Band gig in the summer of 1970 at a venue named "The Barn" in Sunapee, New Hampshire that the group met Steven Tyler. Next, the four of them agreed to move to Boston to start a band (not yet named Aerosmith). Scott left the group shortly thereafter and was replaced by Tyler on drums. The three became a power trio with Hamilton on bass, Perry on guitar, and Tyler doubling as both the vocalist and drummer. Guitarist Ray Tabano and drummer Joey Kramer would join shortly thereafter; Kramer replaced Tyler on drums so he could focus on vocals and also named the band "Aerosmith." Tabano would be replaced by Brad Whitford in 1971.

== Personal life ==
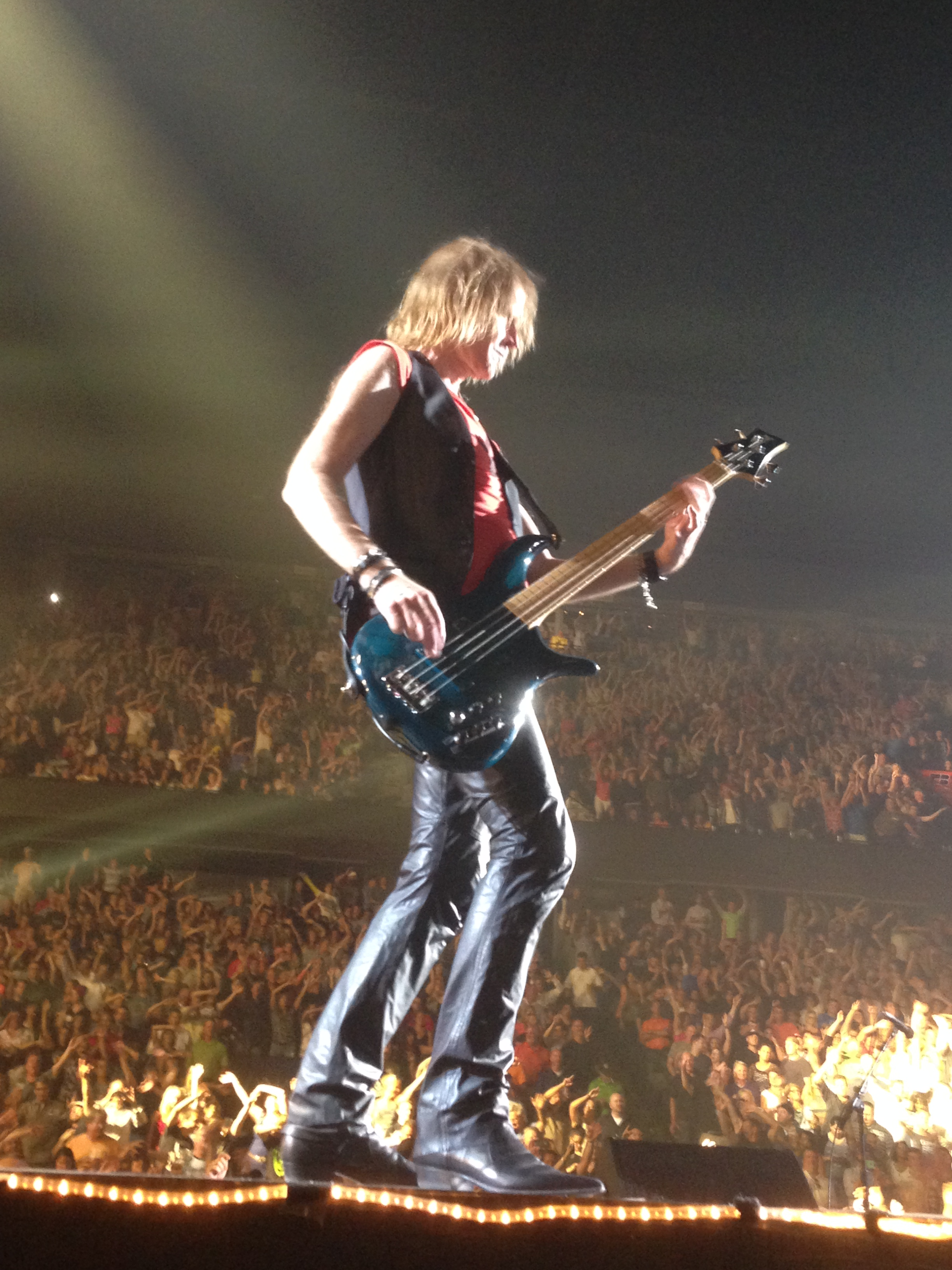
Hamilton performing with Aerosmith on the Blue Army Tour in Grand Rapids, Michigan on August 4, 2015

According to Aerosmith's official website, Hamilton's favorite song by the band is "The Farm" (from the 1997 album Nine Lives). He married Terry Cohen in 1975 and they have two children.

Prior to becoming a musician, Hamilton worked as a nursing home orderly and had embarked on a journey to become an actor; he was accepted into two different acting schools but declined to pursue a career in music. Eventually, however, Hamilton would fulfill his acting goal by joining the cast of Banned in Boston in 1996; he has been performing with them yearly since.

Additionally, he has created and currently owns a line of adult-themed plush toys and merchandise called Obscenies.

In August 2006, he announced that he was diagnosed with throat and tongue cancer and completed a seven-week course of radiation and chemotherapy. As a result, he missed Aerosmith's Route of All Evil Tour. David Hull (who played in the Joe Perry Project) filled in. Prior to this, Hamilton had never missed an Aerosmith show. He sat in with the band on "Sweet Emotion" at their September 2006 Boston show and played an entire performance at a private show at the Beacon Theatre in New York, on December 3, 2006. On December 20, 2006, Hamilton reported on Aero Force One that he is cancer-free after a recent PET scan. He underwent further surgery, causing him to sit out some of the Aerosmith/ZZ Top Tour. David Hull covered for him again during his absence. His cancer returned in 2011, but he is now cancer-free.

Hamilton left the band's April 2013 Australian tour after two shows due to a chest infection. David Hull was flown in from the US to fill in.

In April 2016, Thin Lizzy announced that Hamilton was joining them for their 2016 and 2017 reunion shows.

In September 2024, following Aerosmith's retirement from touring, Hamilton revealed a new band called Close Enemies, featuring other prominent rock musicians such as Tony Brock and Peter Stroud. The band began touring in early 2025, and released their debut single "Sound of a Train" on January 17, 2025.

Hamilton's favorite bassists are John Paul Jones, John Entwistle and Paul McCartney.

== Aerosmith songs written ==
The following Aerosmith songs have a writing credit given to Tom Hamilton

1. "Sweet Emotion" from Toys in the Attic
2. "Uncle Salty" from Toys in the Attic
3. "Sick as a Dog" from Rocks
4. "Critical Mass" from Draw the Line
5. "Kings and Queens" from Draw the Line
6. "The Hand That Feeds" from Draw the Line
7. "The Reason a Dog" from Done with Mirrors
8. "The Hop" from Done with Mirrors
9. "The Movie" from Permanent Vacation
10. "Janie's Got a Gun" from Pump
11. "Krawhitham" from Pandora's Box
12. "Beautiful" from Music from Another Dimension!
13. "Tell Me" from Music from Another Dimension!
14. "Lover Alot" from Music from Another Dimension!
15. "Can't Stop Lovin' You" from Music from Another Dimension!
16. "Up on the Mountain" from Music from Another Dimension! (Deluxe Version) [Also provides lead vocals]

== Awards ==
- 2007 – Boston Music Award – Personal Achievement

== Instruments and equipment ==
Hamilton has used a wide variety of basses over Aerosmith's career. He has stated in several interviews that his first bass was a Fender Precision Bass that he borrowed and later bought from a friend. He would use a Fender Precision Bass in the early years of Aerosmith, and used one to record the bass lines for their first two albums; he would return to using one on the Done with Mirrors album.

Since 2000, Hamilton has primarily played G&L basses. He purchased his first metal-flake G&L ASAT Bass around that time at 48th Street Guitars in New York City. Hamilton now has his own G&L ASAT Bass signature model line, which is made from a unique reduced-weight Western Sugar Pine body. It also comes with specially developed "Hamiltone" pickups and is available for sale in three different metal-flake colors. Hamilton says that he enjoys playing his G&L signature basses as they are an evolution of the Fender Jazz Bass sound and feel, and discusses his signature basses in rig rundowns (most notably in 2012 on the Global Warming Tour).

Hamilton can also be seen playing a unique G&L ASAT Bass, made to resemble an ammunition box, in the Legendary Child music video.

Hamilton also frequently plays Sadowsky basses, and has said that Roger Sadowsky makes "unbelievably nice basses." For the recording of the album Honkin' On Bobo and subsequent tours, he used a butterscotch Sadowsky '51 Fender Precision Bass replica modified with a second pickup. It has been one of his main basses for quite some time, and he appeared as playing this bass in Guitar Hero: Aerosmith. Additionally, Hamilton used a five-string Sadowsky to record the hits "Pink", "I Don't Wanna Miss a Thing", "Taste of India", and "Full Circle." As of June 2009, he was touring with five Sadowsky basses.

During Aerosmith's 1970's heyday, Hamilton primarily used an early model stack-knob Fender Jazz Bass to record bass lines. This bass was used to record the bass lines for "Sweet Emotion" and "Walk This Way." Furthermore, it was also used to record the rest of Toys in the Attic, Rocks, and some of Draw the Line. Hamilton stated that he enjoys the feel of the slender Jazz Bass neck as well as its unique sounding pickups. Though he rarely tours with a Jazz Bass anymore, bandmate Steven Tyler surprised Hamilton with a custom-shop Fender Jazz Bass while the two were at a music store in Vancouver, Canada in 2011; it was used to record most of the songs on Music from Another Dimension!

Notably, Hamilton was one of the earliest and most well-known players of the Music Man StingRay Bass. He first used a StingRay Bass to record most of Draw the Line in 1977. Since then, he used a StingRay Bass to record the albums Rock in a Hard Place, Permanent Vacation, Pump, Nine Lives, and some of Just Push Play. Additionally, he even used a StingRay Bass to record the demo tracks for Get a Grip, before switching to an F Bass. He toured with StingRay basses throughout the late 1970s, and once again toured with various StingRay Bass models during the 2022 "Deuces are Wild" residency and the farewell "Peace Out!" tour. In an interview, Hamilton noted that he was very proud of the tone he got from his early model StingRay Bass on the Pump album.

In the 1970s, 1980s, and early 1990s, Hamilton often played a Gibson Thunderbird Bass on tour.

On the album Night in the Ruts, he used a Music Man Sabre Bass to record his bass lines. He can be seen playing one in the music videos for "No Surprize" and "Chiquita."

For the Get a Grip album, Hamilton recorded all of his bass lines with a five-string F Bass that featured a double split coil P-style pickup configuration; he bought it during the album sessions in 1992.

During the "Dude Looks Like A Lady" sequence of Wayne's World 2, he is seen playing a Gibson Les Paul Bass; it was occasionally used on the 1993–94 Get a Grip Tour.

He has also used a 1960s Höfner Violin Bass to record some of the Just Push Play album, but most notably it was used to record the songs What It Takes and Jaded. Additionally, it was played during the Super Bowl XXXV halftime show. During the Just Push Play sessions, he also used a double bass.

During the 2000s, he toured with several Parker basses. Hamilton worked closely with Parker to develop the Fly Bass and was gifted a prototype version in 2002, which he donated to VH1's Save the Music charity; it raised funds for schools with inadequate music programs. Hamilton had frequently played the bass for six months prior on tour, and it was signed by all five members of Aerosmith as well as employees of Parker Guitars. He was also gifted the first production Fly Bass in April 2003. Lastly, he primarily played a red Fly Bass on the 2004 Honkin' On Bobo Tour.

Other basses played on tour by Hamilton include a Duesenberg Starplayer semi-hollow bass strung with flatwound strings, a Visionary Instruments Video Bass, an Australian-built Tomkins Kimberely 1 Bass, an acoustic Kramer USA bass, a neon-blue colored ESP bass, as well as various four and five string F-Bass models.

In 2023, Hamilton sent a sizable portion of his instrument and equipment collection to Donn's Drum Vault in Bellevue, WA to be offered for public sale. Notable items available for sale were three early-model Music Man StingRay basses, the 1960s Höfner Violin Bass used during the recording of Just Push Play and the Super Bowl XXXV Halftime Show, a '62 American Vintage Re-issue Fender Jazz Bass used in the "Sweet Emotion" 1991 music video, various Sadowsky basses, and two Parker Fly basses fitted with EMG pickups.

Over the course of his career, Hamilton has used an array of different amplifiers and effects. He has been a large proponent of Gallien-Krueger heads and amplifiers. Currently, he uses their Neo 410 and 412 cabinets paired to their Fusion 550 head. During the recording of the Toys in the Attic album, he used an Ampeg B-15 amplifier and an Electro-Voice RE20 microphone. From the 1990s to the early 2010s, Hamilton primarily used Hartke 4.5XL Module cabinets paired with Gallien-Krueger heads.

Hamilton primarily uses TC Electronic effects, namely their Corona Chorus, Mojomojo Overdrive, and G-Major Overdrive Rack Processor. Other effects used by Hamilton include a Pigtronix BASS Fat Drive pedal, a Soundbox Pro multi-wave distortion box, and a Mojo Hand FX Rook Overdrive pedal.

Lastly, Hamilton has been a long-time user of D'Addario 45-100 and 45-130 strings.

== Playing style ==
Hamilton commonly employs pauses in his bass lines to help define the rhythm pattern of the song. He also often uses descending arpeggios, upbeat accents, and pentatonic scales in his playing. Additionally, he frequently uses slides in his bass lines (e.g. "Pink" and "Falling in Love"). Apart from this, Hamilton plays with suspended chords (e.g. "Sweet Emotion"), and also uses open strings to form a low drone sound; he frequently jumps to higher registers so that his notes can ring out. Moreover, he also occasionally plays slap bass (e.g. "Love in an Elevator"). Notably, Hamilton has alternated between playing finger-style and with a pick. Lastly, on "Taste of India", he used a percussion mallet.
