= Can't Stop Lovin' You (Aerosmith song) =

Single by Aerosmith featuring Carrie Underwood

from the album Music from Another Dimension!
- Released: April 6, 2013
- Recorded: 2011–12
- Studio: Pandora's Box, Poppy Studios, Spitfire Studio and Swing House Studios
- Genre: Hard rock, country rock
- Length: 4:04 (album version); 3:49 (single version)
- Label: Columbia
- Songwriters: Steven Tyler; Marti Frederiksen; Tom Hamilton; Joey Kramer; Brad Whitford
- Producers: Marti Frederiksen; Steven Tyler

Aerosmith singles chronology
"What Could Have Been Love" (2012)	"Can't Stop Lovin' You" (2013)	"My Only Angel" (2025)

Carrie Underwood singles chronology
"Two Black Cadillacs" (2012)	"Can't Stop Lovin' You" (2013)	"See You Again" (2013)

"Can't Stop Lovin' You" is a power ballad by American hard rock band Aerosmith featuring American country recording artist Carrie Underwood that was released on April 6, 2013, as the fourth single from the Aerosmith album Music from Another Dimension!.

== Background ==
Aerosmith lead singer and songwriter Steven Tyler and frequent collaborator Marti Frederiksen wrote the song with the band during sessions for Music from Another Dimension!. Tyler sang it in an "emotional drawl" similar to the band's 1993 hit "Cryin'" and the song took on a romantic, country sound.

Tyler commented, "When it was done, it was discussed that I might have sang [sic] it a little too country. And all along we thought, should we get someone in?" Tyler contacted country singer Carrie Underwood, whom he had collaborated with in recent years, including a duet at a 2012 Country Music Television Special and a performance at the 2011 Academy of Country Music Awards, where Tyler and Underwood performed the Aerosmith classic "Walk This Way" together, as well as Underwood's song "Undo It", which was co-written by Frederiksen. The day Tyler contacted Underwood, she happened to be in town but had to leave the next morning, so Tyler asked her if she could come into record that night, and she agreed.

== Response ==
About 2 1/2 months after the release of Music from Another Dimension!, "Can't Stop Lovin' You" was released as a single to adult contemporary, hot adult contemporary, and modern radio formats on January 21, 2013. Examiner.com wrote that the song features "country-pop guitar licks and an earworm melody right up Underwood's alley". Aerosmith lead guitarist Joe Perry was initially skeptical of the collaboration with Underwood, but after hearing it, said "Their voices matched up really well. It doesn't sound forced. It was just right."
