= Close Enemies (band) =

American rock supergroup

- Genres: Rock
- Years active: 2023-present
- Labels: The Label Group, Virgin
- Spinoff of: Aerosmith, The Babys
- Members: Tom Hamilton; Peter Stroud; Chasen Hampton; Trace Foster; Tony Brock
- Website: https://closeenemiestheband.com/

Close Enemies is an American rock supergroup. The band consists of bassist Tom Hamilton (Aerosmith), guitarist Peter Stroud (Sara McLachlan, Sheryl Crow, Pete Droge), guitarist Trace Foster (guitar tech for Aerosmith, AC/DC, and The Rolling Stones), drummer Tony Brock (The Babys), and vocalist Chasen Hampton (The Party). The group formed in 2023 after Aerosmith lead vocalist Steven Tyler injured his vocal chords three shows into the group's planned farewell tour. The group's self-titled debut album was released March 13, 2026 through The Label Group/Virgin Music Group.

== Members ==
- Chasen Hampton - Lead vocals (2023–present)
- Peter Stroud - Guitars (2023–present)
- Trace Foster - Guitars (2023–present)
- Tom Hamilton - Bass (2023–present)
- Tony Brock - Drums (2023–present)

== Discography ==
- Close Enemies (2026)
