= We're All Somebody from Somewhere =

Studio album by Steven Tyler
- Released: July 15, 2016
- Recorded: 2015–16
- Genre: Country rock, blues, blues-rock, country blues
- Length: 54:29
- Label: Dot
- Producer: Steven Tyler; T Bone Burnett; Marti Frederiksen; Jared Gutstadt; Dann Huff; Jaren Johnston; Jeff Peters; Poo Bear; Luke Silas

Singles from We're All Somebody from Somewhere
- 1. "Love Is Your Name" Released: May 13, 2015; 2. "Red White & You" Released: January 22, 2016; 3. "We're All Somebody from Somewhere" Released: June 24, 2016

We're All Somebody from Somewhere is the debut solo studio album by American singer-songwriter Steven Tyler. The album was released on July 15, 2016, by Dot Records.

== Critical reception ==
Professional ratings
Aggregate scores
Source	Rating
Metacritic	62/100
Review scores
Source	Rating
AllMusic	3/5 stars
Entertainment Weekly	B+
The Independent	2/5 stars
The Observer	2/5 stars
Rolling Stone	2.5/5 stars
Slant Magazine	2.5/5 stars
USA Today	2.5/4 stars

We're All Somebody from Somewhere received generally mixed reviews from music critics. At Metacritic, which assigns a normalized rating out of 100 to reviews from mainstream critics, the album received an average score of 62 based on 12 reviews, which indicates "generally favorable reviews".

== Commercial performance ==
In the United States, the album debuted at number 19 on the Billboard 200, with 18,000 album equivalent units in its first week. It also debuted at number 1 on the Top Country Albums. with 16,800 pure album sold. The album has sold 50,700 copies in the United States as of January 2017.

== Track listing ==
No.	Title	Writer(s)	Producer(s)	Length
1.	"My Own Worst Enemy"	Steven Tyler, Brad Warren, Brett Warren	T Bone Burnett, Tyler	5:11
2.	"We're All Somebody from Somewhere"	Tyler, Jaren Johnston	Tyler, Johnston	2:57
3.	"Hold On (Won't Let Go)"	Tyler, Jason Boyd, Jared Gutstadt, Jeff Peters	Burnett, Tyler, Gutstadt^{[a]}, Poo Bear^{[a]}, Peters^{[b]}, Luke Silas^{[b]}	2:53
4.	"It Ain't Easy"	Tyler, Cary Barlowe, Nathan Barlowe, Hillary Lindsey	Burnett, Tyler	4:05
5.	"Love Is Your Name"	Lindsey Lee, Eric Paslay	Dann Huff, Tyler	3:30
6.	"I Make My Own Sunshine"	Alyssa Bonagura	Marti Frederiksen, Tyler	3:01
7.	"Gypsy Girl"	Tyler, Ross Copperman, David Hodges	Burnett, Tyler	4:29
8.	"Somebody New"	Tyler, Brett James, Lindsey, Troy Verges	Burnett, Tyler	4:11
9.	"Only Heaven"	Tyler, Rhett Akins, Chris DeStefano	Huff, Tyler	3:24
10.	"The Good, the Bad, the Ugly & Me"	Tyler, Brad Warren, Brett Warren	Burnett, Tyler	3:28
11.	"Red, White & You"	Tyler, N. Barlowe, Levi Hummon, Jon Vella	Huff, Tyler	3:02
12.	"Sweet Louisiana"	Tyler, C. Barlowe, N. Barlowe, Lindsey	Burnett, Tyler	3:02
13.	"What Am I Doin' Right?"	Tyler, Brad Warren, Brett Warren	Burnett, Tyler	3:25
14.	"Janie's Got a Gun"	Tyler, Tom Hamilton	Frederiksen, Tyler	3:29
15.	"Piece of My Heart" (with The Loving Mary Band)	Bert Berns, Jerry Ragovoy	Frederiksen, Tyler	4:22

Notes

- ^a signifies a co-producer
- ^b signifies an additional producer

== Charts ==
=== Weekly charts ===
Chart (2016)	Peak position
Australian Albums (ARIA)	37
Austrian Albums (Ö3 Austria)	39
Belgian Albums (Ultratop Wallonia)	156
Canadian Albums (Billboard)	21
French Albums (SNEP)	117
German Albums (Offizielle Top 100)	32
Scottish Albums (OCC)	35
Swiss Albums (Schweizer Hitparade)	14
UK Albums (OCC)	67
US Billboard 200	19
US Top Country Albums (Billboard)	1

=== Year-end charts ===
Chart (2016)	Position
US Top Country Albums (Billboard)	52
