= Joey Kramer Hit Hard =

2010 video game

Hit Hard
- Developers: Paid, Inc.
- Series: Hit Hard
- Platform: iOS
- Release: WW: February 26, 2010
- Genre: Music
- Modes: Single-player, multiplayer

Joey Kramer Hit Hard, also known as "Hit Hard", is a music game developed for the iOS in February 2010. It is the first game in the series. Joey Kramer's new iPhone application is named after the drummer's book, Hit Hard: A Story of Hitting Rock Bottom at the Top, which was released in June 2009.

On February 26, 2010, American studio Paid, Inc. released the first version of the Joey Kramer Hit Hard iPhone Game to the iTunes Store. It is Compatible with iPhone and iPod touch. Requires iPhone OS 3.0 or later. According to the game’s description, it allows the user to “step up to the kit with Aerosmith’s Joey Kramer and put your skills to the test.” The game has 15 levels of different beats from well-known Aerosmith hits.

During freestyle play, players can tap the various drums and cymbals that make up Joey’s on-screen drum kit and hear the sounds in real time to knock out their own beats or those of their favorite Aerosmith hits. Freestyle play is not scored and is not part of the Hit Hard competition.

Each level has the user tap the sequence of drum beats to match Kramer’s. The levels become increasingly difficult as the game goes on. Once the user has completed all 15 levels, he or she then receives a message from Joey Kramer and submits their high score to the leader board. The interactive leader board on the game shows scores from iPhones and iPod Touches, and it allows players to see where they stand world-wide. Upon the user submitting their high score, they are then entered for a chance to win a prize from Kramer. To drum up the competition, the app gives away exciting prizes to the person who holds the highest score for the Joey Kramer "Hit Hard" iPhone App at the end of each month.

The prizes awarded to those with the high scores vary each month. Winners may take home things like snare drums, drumsticks, autographed drum heads, autographed Zildjian cymbals, and more. The prizes vary in retail value; however, some are said to be upwards of $1000.00.
