= Music from Another Dimension! =

2012 studio album by Aerosmith

Studio album by Aerosmith
- Released: November 6, 2012
- Recorded: 2011–2012
- Genre: Hard rock
- Length: 68:00
- Label: Columbia
- Producers: Jack Douglas; Steven Tyler; Joe Perry; Marti Frederiksen

Aerosmith chronology
Honkin' on Bobo (2004)	Music from Another Dimension! (2012)	Greatest Hits (2023)

Singles from Music from Another Dimension!
- 1. "Legendary Child" Released: May 24, 2012; 2. "Lover Alot" Released: August 22, 2012; 3. "What Could Have Been Love" Released: August 22, 2012; 4. "Can't Stop Lovin' You" Released: January 21, 2013

Music from Another Dimension! is the fifteenth studio album by the American rock band Aerosmith, released on November 6, 2012, by Columbia Records. The album marked their first release since 2004's Honkin' on Bobo, as well as the first to feature all-new material since 2001's Just Push Play. The release marked the longest release gap between the band's previous studio album releases. It additionally also marked the last album in their recording contract with Columbia Records. The record was produced by Jack Douglas, Steven Tyler, Joe Perry, and Marti Frederiksen (three tracks).

The album includes the singles "Legendary Child", "Lover Alot", "What Could Have Been Love", and "Can't Stop Lovin' You".

Music from Another Dimension! debuted at number five on the Billboard 200 selling 63,000 copies its first week, a lower amount than their previous album of original material.

== Overview and recording history ==
=== Cocked, Locked, Ready to Rock Tour and 2011–2012 sessions ===
In February 2010, Aerosmith announced a world tour, entitled the "Cocked, Locked, Ready to Rock Tour", which took the band to 42 locations through September 2010. On the tour, tension between the band members flared due to a series of on-stage incidents between Tyler and Perry, and the announcement of Tyler as a new talent judge on the television program American Idol, which Tyler did not inform his band members about before signing on to the program. When announcing the 2010 tour, the band said that the next item on the agenda was the band's next studio album. It was also revealed that the group did in fact do some recording with producer Brendan O'Brien in 2008 but halted because of the health problems of band members. Bassist Tom Hamilton told the Boston Herald in September 2010 that Tyler believes he has the time and energy to continue fronting the band while also being a judge on American Idol. Hamilton explained, "Steven's been very emphatic in saying that the way his time is arranged on the show leaves room to work on a record. He's been taking great pains to remind everybody of that, so hopefully that's the way it will come out." On November 5, 2010, guitarist Brad Whitford said the recording sessions would probably be in Los Angeles, where American Idol is headquartered, and a world tour would follow.

In a November 2010 interview reported at NME.com, drummer Joey Kramer confirmed that the band had every intention to finish and release their long-delayed album in 2011, stating, "Really, at this point in time, the only thing that's going to stop us is if someone out-and-out dies. Other than that, we've already been through what we've been through and stood the test of time. What else is there?" On January 18, 2011, shortly before the start of Tyler's debut as an American Idol judge for the 2011 season, Tyler declared that "Joe (Perry) has got some licks and I've got a bunch of songs that I've written for solo and/or Aerosmith" and the band would start prepping the album that week. In June 2011, Joe Perry announced that the band was going to meet at the recording studio to produce the next album of the band in July. Throughout the summer of 2011, the band worked on the album and regularly provided video updates of the recording sessions to their fans. On August 30, it was announced that the new album would be released around May 2012 and that the album would be produced by Jack Douglas, who produced four albums for the band in the 1970s, and also helped provide production on 2004's Honkin' on Bobo. Aerosmith toured Japan and Latin America in the fall of 2011 In January 2012, Tyler said that all of the album had been written, but that he just had to finish writing and recording the lyrics for the album, which he did while in the midst of his second season as a judge on American Idol. Perry remarked "I never felt for a minute he was lagging in the studio because of his other job. He did his whole thing [on Idol] and then showed up at eight at night and was in the studio until two in the morning."

=== Release of new material (2012) ===
On May 22, 2012, the album's first single, "Legendary Child" was released and on May 23, the band performed the song on the season finale of American Idol. Immediately after the band debuted their new single "Legendary Child" on May 23, the band released the new album's track list, title, and release date. At the time, the track list consisted of only twelve songs and was scheduled for release on August 28, 2012. In June 2012, it was announced that the album's release date would be pushed back to November 6, 2012.

On May 30, Aerosmith and Cheap Trick performed for Walmart shareholders and then began the "Global Warming Tour" on June 16 in Minneapolis, which took the band to 25 locations across North America through August 12. During the tour, Aerosmith performed new material from the album, including the single "Legendary Child", as well as the album track "Oh Yeah". In addition, "Beautiful" was played on the PA system before Aerosmith's show at the Hollywood Bowl on August 6.

On August 15, 2012, Aerosmith, released a video with bassist Tom Hamilton on their official YouTube channel, asking fans which artwork he should choose for their second single, "What Could Have Been Love". However, both images shown were blurred out. "Lover Alot" and "What Could Have Been Love" were released on radio simultaneously on August 22 and on the iTunes Store on August 28. On August 28, a revised track list consisting of 15 songs was released. On August 31, Kramer premiered "Street Jesus" on an Austin, Texas, radio station, where it was largely well received by hardcore fans.

On October 17, 2012, Rolling Stone premiered the opening track "Luv XXX". The entire album was premiered, track-by-track, leading up to the album's release on November 6, 2012. There was a major leak of the album on October 17 when Rolling Stone uploaded all of the songs to their media player without placing any type of protection on them. The fifteen songs on the regular edition of the album proceeded to circulate on the internet.

On October 20, 2012, as part of Pepsi's NFL Anthems project, Aerosmith released a rewritten version of "Legendary Child" titled, "Legendary Child – Patriots Anthem". The lyrics have been reworked as a tribute to the New England Patriots. The song was available for free download at www.pepsianthems.com.

== Content ==
=== Production and writing credits ===
The album was mostly produced by Jack Douglas, who produced five albums for the band in the 1970s and early 1980s (Get Your Wings, Toys in the Attic, Rocks, Draw the Line, Rock in a Hard Place) as well as helped produce the band's blues cover album Honkin' on Bobo (2004). Lead singer Steven Tyler and lead guitarist Joe Perry also co-produced the record, like they have on every record since 1997. Marti Frederiksen, who has produced and/or co-written much of the band's material since 1997, co-produced and/or co-wrote four of the album's tracks, including the singles "Lover Alot", "What Could Have Been Love", and "Can't Stop Lovin' You".

Tyler and Perry remain the band's principal songwriters, with Tyler having credits on eleven songs and Perry on seven songs; four of Perry's credits are solo. Every song, other than Diane Warren's "We All Fall Down" features at least one Aerosmith band member's songwriting input. In addition, Tyler and Perry have renewed their exclusive songwriting partnership, writing the songs "Luv XXX" and "Out Go the Lights" together, without outside help. This marks the first time since "Fever" (1993) that this has happened. Guitarist Brad Whitford and bassist Tom Hamilton have their first songwriting credits since Pump (1989), each of them co-writing three songs apiece. Hamilton also contributed 2 solo writing credits for the first time. Drummer Joey Kramer has his first songwriting credits since Permanent Vacation (1987).

In addition to Diane Warren, who previously wrote "I Don't Want to Miss a Thing" for the band (which remains their only number one Billboard Hot 100 hit), the album also includes the return of familiar outside songwriting collaborators Desmond Child ("Another Last Goodbye") and Jim Vallance ("Legendary Child"), who each co-wrote one track apiece. This marked Child's first contribution since Nine Lives while Vallance had been absent since Get A Grip. New as an Aerosmith songwriting collaborator is Marco Moir (Brad Whitford's current guitar tech), who co-wrote "Lover Alot". Also garnering their first songwriting credits on Aerosmith songs are the band's touring keyboardist Russ Irwin (who co-wrote "What Could Have Been Love") and Kramer's son Jesse Sky (who co-wrote "Lover Alot").

=== Music ===
Perry says that 2004's Honkin' on Bobo was actually supposed to be this album, but the energy wasn't right at the time. However, like Honkin' on Bobo, Perry says that this album was recorded with "live, in-the-room excitement". He also says that, like with their albums from the 1970s (and unlike their albums from the 1980s and 1990s), he found himself going back and listening to the completed tracks constantly. He also revealed that the album does indeed include older material, including a riff that is at least 20 years old, stating that it may end up in several songs, "in a mini-opera kind of way". During the recording process, Perry described the sound of the music as "[It] sounds like dinosaurs eating cars – musical dinosaurs with [a] sick beat. Is that a good thing?" "Legendary Child", "Lover Alot", and "Oh Yeah" are described as rockers. The former two have been released as singles and have garnered airplay on rock radio. American Idol runner-up Lauren Alaina provides backing vocals to "Oh Yeah", a song that was a nightly staple throughout the band's "Global Warming Tour". "What Could Have Been Love" is described as a ballad, and has already been released as a single and has garnered airplay on adult contemporary radio stations. "Luv XXX" is described by Steven Tyler as "Beatlesque" and includes backing vocals from John Lennon's son Julian Lennon. "Freedom Fighter" is described as a "politically conscious rocker" and also includes backing vocals by Johnny Depp. Country star Carrie Underwood duets with Tyler on "Can't Stop Lovin' You", which is described as "a country-western crossover ballad". In addition, former Aerosmith guitarist Rick Dufay (who was in the band from 1981 to 1984) plays on the song "Shakey Ground", which is a cover of an R&B song originally done by The Temptations in 1975. "Shakey Ground" is now slated to appear on the Walmart exclusive version of the record. Tom Hamilton also has his first lead vocal on the song "Up on a Mountain", which was released as a bonus track.

=== Album cover ===
Tom Hamilton said the album name was suggested by Jack Douglas, and he said "It’s kind of that we feel such a connection to our early days working with Jack, it just created a vibe that was very familiar from those early 70′s records. It’s almost like these young punks from another dimension who came out to have their influence on the album." This led to a B movie inspired cover, designed by the band's road documentarian Casey Tebo. The album features two different covers: one for the regular release, and one for the deluxe release. The vinyl version features a similar cover to the deluxe edition, though the vinyl includes the same track listing as the standard edition of the CD release, spread out over two red vinyl albums (a standard release CD is also included inside one of the sleeves of the vinyl release).

== Commercial and critical reception ==
Professional ratings
Aggregate scores
Source	Rating
Metacritic	54/100
Review scores
Source	Rating
AllMusic	3/5 stars
Chicago Tribune	1.5/4 stars
Entertainment Weekly	B
The Guardian	2/5 stars
The Independent	2/5 stars
Revolver	4.5/5 stars
Rolling Stone	3/5 stars
Slant Magazine	3/5 stars
USA Today	3/4 stars
Ultimate Classic Rock	7/10

Music from Another Dimension! debuted at number five on the Billboard 200 selling just 63,000 copies its first week, a sharp contrast to previous debuts. According to the review aggregator Metacritic, Music from Another Dimension! received "mixed or average reviews" based on a weighted average score of 54 out of 100 from 22 critic scores. The album with its 15-track length was found to be sonically in-cohesive and lacking direction by many reviewers.

== Previews ==
=== Small clips ===
Before the first trailer was released, two small clips of the band in the studio were released, the first an interview with a guitar solo, and the second a jam in the Boneyard (Joe Perry's home recording studio).

=== Trailer one ===
On August 24, 2012, Aerosmith released the first trailer for the album on YouTube. It included pro-shot live footage (possibly from the upcoming bonus DVD for the album), interviews with the band, scenes of the band inside the studio, and snippets from the single "Legendary Child".

=== Trailer two ("Episode One: The Beginning") ===
On September 7, 2012, Aerosmith released the second trailer for the album on Vimeo. The beginning of the video was made to look like a comic-book with pictures of Aerosmith recording and discussing the album, a new song, "Luv XXX" played in the background. After a thirty-five second clip of the new song, the video transferred into a room where the members and producer, Jack Douglas, were tossing around ideas. Then, it cut to several studio clips of the band rehearsing and recording the album with a commentary by Tom Hamilton. Following that, the video cut to another clip of the new song and then finished.

=== Trailer three ("Episode Two: The Writing") ===
On September 17, 2012, Aerosmith released the third trailer for the album on Vimeo. The preview started off with Joe Perry and producer, Jack Douglas, in the studio discussing a song from the upcoming album, then it cut to the same opening in the episode one. After the intro, the video cut to a clip filmed in the summer of 2011 of Tom Hamilton, Joe Perry and Joey Kramer discussing one of Perry's contributions to the album and working out the guitar riffs. The third clip in the video was of the band at Vindaloo Studios with a voice-over commentary by Kramer; the commentary lasted for two more clips. The second to last clip was of the band discussing a few songs in an office with Douglas; it included Steven Tyler playing guitar. The last clip was a montage of small studio sessions.

== Track listing ==
Music from Another Dimension! track listing
No.	Title	Lyrics	Music	Length
1.	"Luv XXX"	Steven Tyler	Tyler; Joe Perry	5:17
2.	"Oh Yeah"	Perry	Perry	3:41
3.	"Beautiful"	Tyler; Marti Frederiksen	Tyler; Frederiksen; Brad Whitford; Joey Kramer; Tom Hamilton	3:05
4.	"Tell Me"	Hamilton	Hamilton	3:45
5.	"Out Go the Lights"	Tyler	Tyler; Perry	6:55
6.	"Legendary Child"	Tyler	Tyler, Perry, Jim Vallance	4:15
7.	"What Could Have Been Love"	Tyler, Frederiksen, Russ Irwin	Tyler, Frederiksen, Irwin	3:44
8.	"Street Jesus"	Tyler	Tyler, Whitford	6:43
9.	"Can't Stop Lovin' You" (featuring Carrie Underwood)	Tyler, Frederiksen	Tyler, Frederiksen, Whitford, Kramer, Hamilton	4:04
10.	"Lover Alot"	Tyler	Tyler, Frederiksen, Perry, Hamilton, Whitford, Kramer, Jesse Kramer, Marco Moir	3:35
11.	"We All Fall Down"	Diane Warren	Warren	5:14
12.	"Freedom Fighter"	Perry	Perry	3:19
13.	"Closer"	Tyler	Tyler, Frederiksen, Kramer	4:04
14.	"Something"	Perry	Perry	4:37
15.	"Another Last Goodbye"	Tyler, Desmond Child	Tyler, Child, Perry	5:47
Total length:				67:59

Wal-Mart (U.S.) bonus track
No.	Title	Lyrics	Music	Length
16.	"Shakey Ground" (The Temptations cover)	Jeffrey Bowen, Al Boyd, Eddie Hazel	Bowen, Boyd, Hazel	4:39
Total length:				72:32

Japanese edition bonus tracks
No.	Title	Lyrics	Music	Length
16.	"Shakey Ground" (The Temptations cover)	Jeffrey Bowen, Al Boyd, Eddie Hazel	Bowen, Boyd, Hazel
17.	"I'm Not Talkin'" (Mose Allison cover)	Mose Allison	Allison	3:16
Total length:				75:48

Deluxe edition bonus tracks (disc 2)
No.	Title	Lyrics	Music	Length
1.	"Up on the Mountain"	Hamilton	Hamilton	5:06
2.	"Oasis in the Night"	Perry	Perry	4:06
3.	"Sunny Side of Love"	Tyler	Tyler, Frederiksen	3:28
Total length:				12:39

Deluxe edition DVD (disc 3)
No.	Title	Length
1.	"Same Old Song and Dance" (live concert performance from Tacoma)	6:13
2.	"Oh Yeah" (live concert performance from Tacoma)	3:49
3.	"Rats in the Cellar" (live concert performance from Tacoma)	10:15
4.	"Train Kept A-Rollin'" (live concert performance from Hollywood with Johnny Depp)	5:46
5.	"A Conversation with Steven Tyler and Joe Perry"	4:43
6.	"Brad Whitford Interview"	2:18
7.	"Joe Perry Interview"	2:44
8.	"Joey Kramer Interview"	4:02
9.	"Steven Tyler Interview"	2:41
10.	"Tom Hamilton Interview"	1:44

== Personnel ==
Aerosmith

- Steven Tyler – lead vocals, harmonica on "Out Go the Lights", drums on "Something", arrangement, backing vocals on "Up on the Mountain", production
- Joe Perry – lead and rhythm guitar, backing vocals, lead vocals on "Freedom Fighter", "Something", and "Oasis in the Night", production
- Brad Whitford – rhythm and lead guitar, backing vocals
- Tom Hamilton – bass guitar, lead vocals on "Up on the Mountain"
- Joey Kramer – drums, percussion

Additional musicians

- Julian Lennon – background vocals on "Luv XXX"
- Melanie Taylor – background vocals on "Oh Yeah" and "Out Go the Lights"
- Sharlotte Gibson – background vocals on "Oh Yeah"
- Laura Jones – background vocals on "Oh Yeah"
- Tom Scott – tenor saxophone on "Oh Yeah" and "Out Go the Lights"
- Jessy J – tenor saxophone on "Oh Yeah"
- John Mitchell – baritone saxophone on "Oh Yeah" and "Out Go the Lights"
- Bill Reichenbach Jr. – trombone on "Oh Yeah" and "Out Go the Lights"
- Gary Grant – trumpet on "Oh Yeah" and "Out Go the Lights"
- Larry Hall – trumpet on "Oh Yeah" and "Out Go the Lights"
- Mia Tyler – backing vocals on "Beautiful"
- Russ Irwin – piano and backing vocals on "What Could Have Been Love"
- Carrie Underwood – featured vocals on "Can't Stop Lovin' You"
- Johnny Depp – background vocals on "Freedom Fighter"
- Bruce Witkin – background vocals on "Freedom Fighter"
- Paul Santo – Hammond organ on "Something" and "Tell Me", keyboards on "Closer" and "Freedom Fighter", mellotron on "Closer", engineer, pre-production engineer, drum recording, vocal recording, drum engineering, vocal engineer
- Dr. Rudy Tanzi – Hammond organ on "Something" and "Freedom Fighter"
- The Section Quartet: Daphne Chen – violin, Eric Gorfain – violin, Lauren Chipman – viola and Richard Dodd – cello on "We All Fall Down" and "Another Last Goodbye"
- Jesse Sky Kramer – additional drums on "We All Fall Down"
- Zac Rae – piano and synthesizer on "We All Fall Down", electric piano on "Freedom Fighter"
- Desmond Child – piano on "Another Last Goodbye"
- Jesse Kotansky – violin solo on "Another Last Goodbye"
- Daniel J. Coe – synthesizer on "Closer" and "Oasis in the Night", synthesizer and programming on "Another Last Goodbye", arrangement
- Rick Dufay – rhythm guitar on "Shakey Ground"
- Dan Potruch – percussion on "Freedom Fighter"

Production

- Jack Douglas – production, mixing, arrangement, percussion on "Luv XXX", "Oh Yeah", "Tell Me", "Lover Alot", "Closer", "Freedom Fighter", and "Up on the Mountain"; keyboards and backing vocals on "Freedom Fighter"; organ on "Can't Stop Loving You"; synthesizer and backing vocals on "Legendary Child"; outro piano on "Street Jesus"
- Marti Frederiksen – production on "Beautiful", "What Could Have Been Love" and "Can't Stop Lovin' You"; Pro Tools, backing vocals on "What Could Have Been Love"; keyboards and guitar Roland synthesizer on "Closer" introduction
- Warren Huart – engineering, mixing, and backing vocals on "Legendary Child"
- Al Schmidt – mixing
- Chris Lord-Alge – mixing
- Neal Avron – mixing
- Anthony Focx – Pro Tools editing
- Daphne Chen – arrangement
- Tom Scott – arrangement
- Casey Tebo – artwork
- Slash – inside artwork

== Charts and certifications ==
=== Weekly charts ===
Weekly chart performance for Music from Another Dimension!
Chart (2012)	Peak position
Argentine Albums (CAPIF)	7
Australian Albums (ARIA)	30
Austrian Albums (Ö3 Austria)	12
Belgian Albums (Ultratop Flanders)	67
Belgian Albums (Ultratop Wallonia)	23
Canadian Albums (Billboard)	6
Czech Albums (ČNS IFPI)	16
Danish Albums (Hitlisten)	28
Dutch Albums (Album Top 100)	33
Finnish Albums (Suomen virallinen lista)	17
French Albums (SNEP)	35
German Albums (Offizielle Top 100)	7
Greek Albums (IFPI)	25
Hungarian Albums (MAHASZ)	14
Irish Albums (IRMA)	32
Italian Albums (FIMI)	7
Japanese Albums (Billboard)	6
Mexican Albums (Top 100 Mexico)	93
Norwegian Albums (VG-lista)	26
Polish Albums (ZPAV)	31
Scottish Albums (Official Charts)	9
Spanish Albums (Promusicae)	18
Swedish Albums (Sverigetopplistan)	11
Swiss Albums (Schweizer Hitparade)	5
UK Albums (Official Charts)	14
UK Rock & Metal Albums (Official Charts)	1
US Billboard 200	5
US Top Rock Albums (Billboard)	1

=== Year-end charts ===
Year-end chart performance for Music from Another Dimension!
Chart (2013)	Position
US Top Rock Albums (Billboard)	59

=== Certifications ===
Certifications and sales for Music from Another Dimension!
Region	Certification	Certified units/sales
Canada (Music Canada)	Gold	40,000^{^}
^{^} Shipments figures based on certification alone.
