= Lover Alot =

Single by Aerosmith

from the album Music from Another Dimension!
- Released: August 22, 2012
- Recorded: 2011–12 on Pandora's Box and Swing House Studios
- Genre: Hard rock
- Length: 3:36
- Label: Columbia/Sony Music
- Songwriter(s): Steven Tyler; Marti Frederiksen; Joe Perry; Tom Hamilton; Brad Whitford; Joey Kramer; Jesse Sky Kramer; Marco Moir
- Producer(s): Jack Douglas; Steven Tyler; Joe Perry

Aerosmith singles chronology
"Legendary Child" (2012)	"Lover Alot" (2012)	"What Could Have Been Love" (2012)

"Lover Alot" is a single by American hard rock band Aerosmith that was released August 22, 2012. It is included on Aerosmith's 15th studio album, Music from Another Dimension!. The song premiered on radio stations throughout North America a week before being released as a single. Along with the album, the song was then officially released on November 6, 2012. The song is notable for featuring the Aerosmith songwriting debut of two people: Jesse Sky Kramer (son of Joey Kramer) and Marco Moir (Brad Whitford's guitar technician).

On January 25, 2013, it was announced that the song would be coming to Rock Band 3 as Downloadable Content along with five other Aerosmith songs as part of the "Aerosmith's Greatest Dimension" pack. The pack was released on January 29, 2013.

== Charts ==
Chart (2012)	Peak position
US Rock Songs (Billboard)	47
