= Russ Irwin =

American singer-songwriter

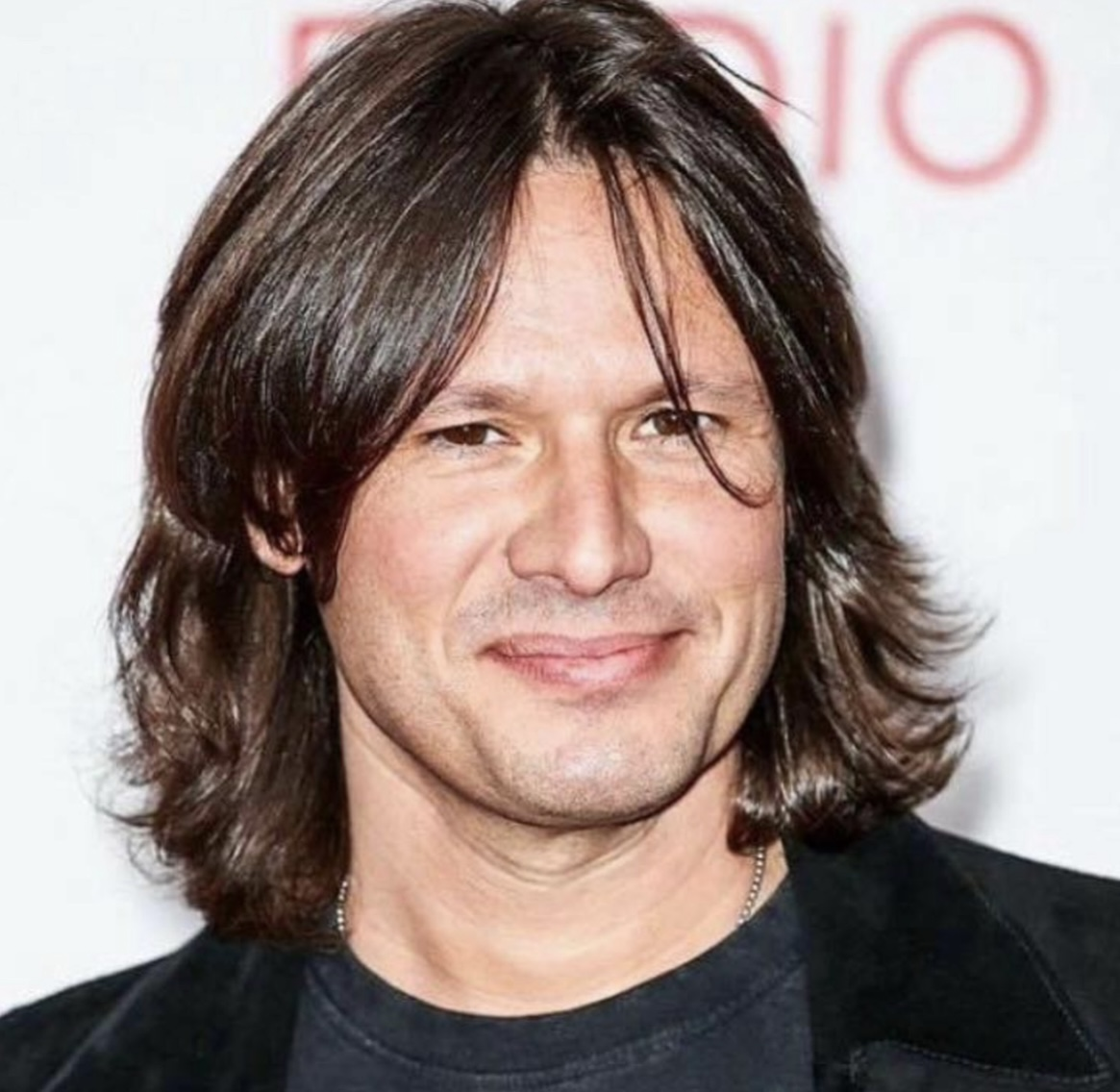

Background information
- Born: May 3, 1968 (age 57)
- Origin: New York City, United States
- Genres: Rock, Blues, Blues-rock
- Occupations: Musician, producer, Film composer
- Instruments: Vocals, piano, keyboards, guitar, drums
- Years active: 1991–present
- Labels: SBK, Columbia
- Website: russirwin.com

Russ Irwin is an American singer-songwriter, producer, film composer and multi-instrumentalist. He has worked with multiple artists including Aerosmith, Sting, Bryan Adams, Meat Loaf, Foreigner, Cheap Trick, John Fogerty, Joe Bonamassa, Scorpions, and Curt Smith (Tears for Fears).

Irwin studied music business and classical piano at New York University and also attended the New School for jazz piano and composition. In 1991, he was signed by Charles Koppelman to SBK Records and a self-titled album, produced by Phil Ramone (Billy Joel, Paul Simon, Paul McCartney) followed later that year. The album debuted on the Billboard Heatseekers chart, and the single, "My Heart Belongs to You" hit No. 28 on the Billboard Hot 100. The song "I Need You Now" peaked at No.36 on the Radio & Records Rock chart. In the Spring of 1992, Irwin toured with his band, opening for Roxette.

In the mid-1990s, Irwin went on to play with Mayfield, a band featuring Curt Smith of Tears for Fears, which led to a touring position as a keyboardist, vocalist and guitarist with Aerosmith (1997–2014), Sting, (2000–2001), Bryan Adams (2002), Cheap Trick (2012), Joe Bonamassa (2016) and Stone Temple Pilots (2019)

He has performed live with Maroon 5, Jimmy Page, Jeff Beck, Jonny Lang, Slash, Chris Botti, Alan Parsons, and Jessica Simpson.

Irwin has written songs for multiple artists including Aerosmith, Foreigner, Meat Loaf, and Scorpions.

In 2006, Irwin produced Clay Aiken's single "I Want to Know What Love Is". The Album Debuted at #2 on the Billboard Hot 200 Albums

In 2012 Irwin co-wrote the Aerosmith Adult top 40 hit "What Could Have Been Love" (#21), on the album Music From Another Dimension and also wrote and produced the top 10 hit 'Lollipop' for Japanese artist Risa Hirako.

In 2012 Irwin released his second solo album Get Me Home, which included guest artists Steven Tyler and Brad Whitford of Aerosmith, Chris Botti and Dean DeLeo of Stone Temple Pilots.

== Personal life ==
Irwin's former girlfriend, Carole Radziwill, appeared in the 2012 video for his song "Manhattan." He appeared occasionally on The Real Housewives of New York City while she was a cast member on the reality show.

== Discography ==
Solo

- Russ Irwin – 1991
- Get Me Home – 2012

Musician / Songwriter

- Music from Another Dimension! – Aerosmith
- A Little South of Sanity – Aerosmith
- Rockin' the Joint – Aerosmith
- A Thousand Different Ways – Clay Aiken
- Bat Out of Hell 3 – Meat Loaf
- Humanity: Hour I – Scorpions
- Live to Win – Paul Stanley
- No End in Sight: The Very Best of Foreigner – Foreigner
