= Woman of the World (Aerosmith song) =

Song by Aerosmith

from the album Get Your Wings
- Released: March 15, 1974
- Studio: Record Plant (New York City)
- Genre: Hard rock; blues rock
- Length: 5:50
- Label: Columbia
- Songwriters: Steven Tyler; Don Solomon
- Producer: Jack Douglas

Woman of the World is a song by American rock band, Aerosmith on their second album, Get Your Wings. "Woman of the World" was written by Steven Tyler and former Chain Reaction band-mate, Don Solomon.

== In performance ==
The song was performed constantly during the mid-seventies. The B-Side to the song is "Spaced." The first time it was played was on April 7, 1974 at the Michigan Palace in Detroit. On July 26, 2012 in Atlanta, they performed the first verse of the song.
