= Love Is Your Name =

Single by Steven Tyler

from the album We're All Somebody from Somewhere
- Released: May 13, 2015
- Genre: Country rock
- Length: 3:30
- Label: Dot
- Songwriter(s): Eric Paslay; Lindsey Lee
- Producer(s): Dann Huff; Steven Tyler

Steven Tyler singles chronology
"(It) Feels So Good" (2011)	"Love Is Your Name" (2015)	"Red, White & You" (2016)

"Love Is Your Name" is a song by Aerosmith frontman Steven Tyler. Written by Eric Paslay and Lindsey Lee, it is the lead single from Tyler's debut solo album, We're All Somebody from Somewhere, which was released on July 15, 2016. Like the album, the single is a country song. The song was recorded at Blackbird Studios in Nashville, Tennessee with backing band Loving Mary and was produced by Dann Huff. The single was released on May 13, 2015 to all digital platforms.

== Background ==
Tyler moved to Nashville in January 2015 and has been working with songwriters on new material for his album since then. "Love Is Your Name" was the first song that came out of those sessions. In April, Tyler officially signed a record deal with Scott Borchetta's Dot Records (a subsidiary of the Big Machine Label Group).

Tyler explained that his appreciation for country music has deep roots, identifying The Everly Brothers, Patsy Cline, Dan Hicks, and The Lovin' Spoonful, artists he listened to growing up, among his influences in country and folk.

The song begins with an autoharp, a musical instrument rarely heard in modern country music. The song also features fiddles and banjos.

== Promotion ==
On the day of the single's release on May 13, the song premiered on 120 mainstream country radio stations across the United States through iHeartMedia. Tyler was also interviewed about the song on the Bobby Bones Show, which is syndicated to 80 radio stations and also available through digital subscription. On television, Tyler was interviewed by Nancy O'Dell; this interview was broadcast on CBS This Morning and Entertainment Tonight. Later that evening, on the season 14 finale of American Idol, Tyler performed the song, followed by a duet with Idol third-place finisher Jax of the Janis Joplin song "Piece of My Heart".

On June 13, Tyler will rejoin his Aerosmith bandmates for the Blue Army Tour, which will send the band to 17 locations across North America through August 7 of 2015. After the tour, Tyler plans to return to the studio to finish his country album.

== Commercial performance ==
The song debuted on the Country Airplay chart at No. 33, helped by hourly plays on iHeartMedia stations in its first day of release on May 13. It also debuted on the Hot Country Songs chart at No. 27, selling 25,000 copies in its first week. The song debuted at 75 on the Billboard Hot 100. The song has sold 110,000 copies in the US as of February 2016.

== Music video ==
On July 3, 2015, Tyler released the music video for "Love Is Your Name" on Facebook and YouTube. The video was directed by Trey Fanjoy.

== Chart performance ==
Chart (2015)	Peak position
Canada (Canadian Hot 100)	54
US Billboard Hot 100	75
US Country Airplay (Billboard)	33
US Hot Country Songs (Billboard)	19
