= What Could Have Been Love =

Single by Aerosmith

from the album Music from Another Dimension!
- Released: August 22, 2012
- Recorded: 2011–12 on Pandora's Box, Poppy Studios, Swing House Studios, Mad Dog Studios and Retro Activ Studios
- Genre: Rock
- Length: 3:44
- Label: Columbia/Sony Music
- Songwriters: Steven Tyler; Marti Frederiksen; Russ Irwin
- Producers: Steven Tyler; Marti Frederiksen; Jack Douglas (co-producer)

Aerosmith singles chronology
"Lover Alot" (2012)	"What Could Have Been Love" (2012)	"Can't Stop Lovin' You" (2013)

Music video
- "What Could Have Been Love" on YouTube

"What Could Have Been Love" is a power ballad by American hard-rock band Aerosmith that was released on August 22, 2012. It is featured on their studio album, Music from Another Dimension! A video for the single was released on October 18, 2012, on Vevo.com. The song premiered live on November 8, 2012, at the Chesapeake Energy Arena in Oklahoma City, Oklahoma.

In November 2012, the song charted at number 7 on the Japan Billboard Japan Hot 100 chart.

== Charts ==
Chart (2012)	Peak position
Japan Hot 100 (Billboard)	7
US Rock Songs (Billboard)	48
US Adult Pop Songs (Billboard)	22
US Adult Contemporary (Billboard)	28
