= Joey Kramer =

American drummer (born 1950)

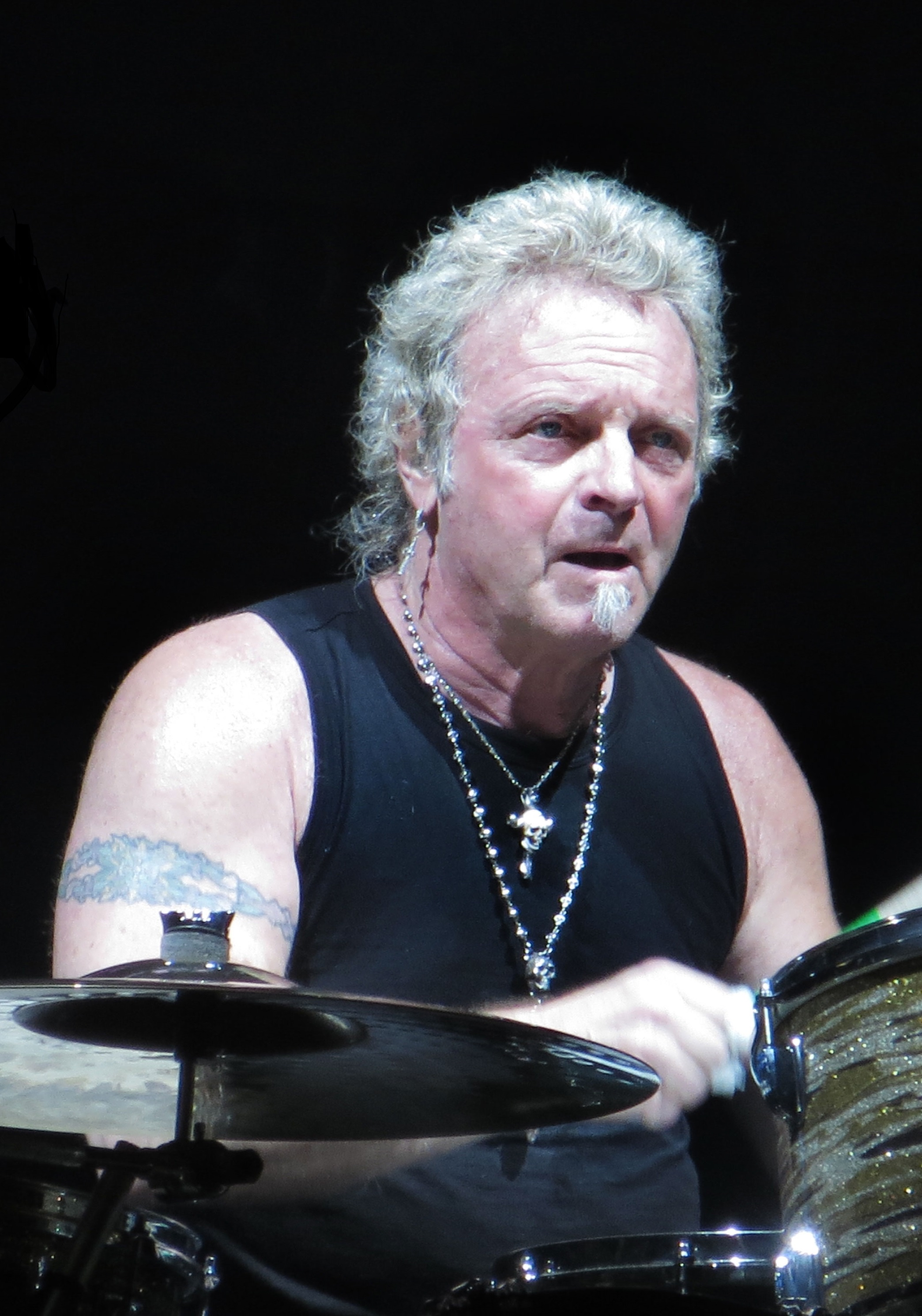
- Kramer performing in 2013

Background information
- Also known as: Kramedog
- Born: Joseph Michael Kramer; June 21, 1950 (age 76)
- Origin: The Bronx, New York City, U.S.
- Genres: Hard rock; blues rock; rock and roll; glam metal; heavy metal
- Occupations: Musician, songwriter, businessman
- Instrument: Drums
- Years active: 1968–present
- Labels: Columbia, Geffen
- Member of: Aerosmith
- Spouses: April Kramer (m. 1979; div. 2007); Linda Kramer (m. 2009; died 2022)
- Website: joeykramer.com

Joseph Michael Kramer (born June 21, 1950) is an American musician best known as the drummer for the hard rock band Aerosmith, which he co-founded in 1970, and with whom he was inducted into the Rock and Roll Hall of Fame in 2001.

== Early life ==
Kramer was born in The Bronx and his later childhood was spent in Yonkers, New York. In Yonkers, he attended the same high school as future Aerosmith bandmate Steven Tyler. though they did not know each other well at the time. Kramer started playing drums at about age 14 and was initially self-taught. In 1969, he moved to Boston, Massachusetts to attend the Berklee College of Music.

While in Boston, Kramer met two more future Aerosmith bandmates, Joe Perry and Tom Hamilton, who at the time were members of a local rock group called the Jam Band. During this period, Kramer played drums for an early version of Tavares (then known as Chubby & the Turnpikes) alongside future Parliament-Funkadelic member Bernie Worrell. He was also a member of the garage rock band The Institution, which was once supported at a gig by Bruce Springsteen's early band Steel Mill.

Kramer eventually became the drummer for the Jam Band. In early 1970, that band played a gig in New Hampshire with Chain Reaction, which coincidentally included Kramer's old acquaintance Steven Tyler. The two bands met again later in 1970, when Kramer, Tyler, Perry, and Hamilton agreed to form a new band to be based in Boston.

== Career ==
=== With Aerosmith ===
Kramer is credited with coining the name "Aerosmith," but contrary to popular belief, it was not based on the Sinclair Lewis novel Arrowsmith. Instead, Kramer had conceived the then-hypothetical band name in 1968 while listening to the Harry Nilsson album Aerial Ballet. Aerosmith began performing in Boston in late 1970, first with rhythm guitarist Ray Tabano, who was replaced the following year by Brad Whitford. who completed the band's classic lineup. Kramer was inducted in to the Rock and Roll Hall of Fame as a member of Aerosmith in 2001.

Kramer, Tyler, and Hamilton are the only members of Aerosmith who have appeared on all the band's albums, with the most recent being Music from Another Dimension! in 2012. Kramer began to miss live performances in 2019 due to various back and shoulder injuries, and was typically replaced onstage by his drum tech John Douglas.

In January 2020, Aerosmith was scheduled to perform at the Grammy Awards and were uncertain if Kramer could play, making him demonstrate his recovery from injuries in what was reported in the press (perhaps inaccurately) as an audition for his own job. Kramer sued the band, claiming that he had been unfairly excluded from group activities, particularly the opportunity to be recognized at the Grammys. The rest of the band claimed to be concerned about Kramer's health but determined that he was unready for the event. A Massachusetts judge ruled against Kramer shortly before the event; Kramer said that he was “extremely disappointed” but would “respect” the ruling, and bowed out of the performance.

After the death of his wife in 2022, Kramer took another leave of absence from Aerosmith and only appeared with the band sporadically in the following years. Aerosmith retired from active concert performances in 2024, but played two all-star reunion concerts in October 2026, at which Kramer played on one song each night.

=== Other activities ===
Kramer's memoir, Hit Hard: A Story of Hitting Rock Bottom at the Top, was released in 2009. In 2010, Kramer created the iPhone-oriented music game Joey Kramer Hit Hard, in which players can compete with his drumming on Aerosmith songs.

Kramer has made two guest appearances as a voice actor on The Simpsons. He played himself, with the rest of Aerosmith, in the episode "Flaming Moe's" (1991), in which it was implied that he was a romantic partner of Edna Krabappel. This storyline was revisited two decades later in the episode "The Ned-Liest Catch" (2011), in which Kramer again provided his voice but this time without the rest of the band.

In 2013, Kramer launched Rockin' & Roastin' Coffee, a whole-bean organic brand. In 2015, he announced a business partnership with Les Otten, the former vice chairman of the Boston Red Sox, to open two locations of Joey Kramer's Rockin' & Roastin' Café and Restaurant. These have since closed.

== Personal life ==
Kramer was born in The Bronx, New York City to Doris and Mickey Kramer, a businessman. He is Jewish and had a bar mitzvah.

He married his first wife, April, in 1979 and they divorced in 2007. Their son Jesse occasionally filled in for his father during Aerosmith shows in the 2010s. He married his second wife, Linda, in 2009; she died in 2022.

== Equipment ==
Kramer currently endorses Pearl drums, Zildjian cymbals and sticks (including his own signature model), plus Remo heads. He has also used many other brands of drums including Ludwig with whom he was closely associated with for much of his career until he switched to Pearl. In the past he has also used sets by Fibes, Tama and DW.

== See also ==
- Joey Kramer Hit Hard (2010)
