= Legendary Child =

Single by Aerosmith

from the album Music from Another Dimension!
- Released: May 24, 2012
- Recorded: 1991; 2011–12 on Pandora's Box and Swing House Studios
- Genre: Hard rock
- Length: 4:15
- Label: Columbia/Sony Music
- Songwriter(s): Steven Tyler; Joe Perry; Jim Vallance
- Producer(s): Jack Douglas; Steven Tyler; Joe Perry

Aerosmith singles chronology
"Devil's Got a New Disguise" (2006)	"Legendary Child" (2012)	"Lover Alot" (2012)

G.I. Joe: Retaliation single

Music video
- Legendary Child on YouTube

"Legendary Child" is a single by American hard rock band Aerosmith that was released May 24, 2012.

The song was originally written and recorded in 1991 during the initial sessions for the Get a Grip album, but was never released. However, a partial instrumental version of the song was played during the Pump Tour in 1990 as part of the "Sweet Emotion" medley with the "Peter Gunn Theme". The song was later re-worked and was included on Aerosmith's fifteenth studio album, Music from Another Dimension!, which was released on November 6, 2012. It also appeared in the film G.I. Joe: Retaliation, which was originally scheduled for theatrical release in the summer of 2012, but was released on March 28, 2013.

Aerosmith debuted "Legendary Child" with a performance of the song on the season finale of the television show American Idol on May 23, 2012. After the performance, the song was made available for digital download and premiered on radio stations.

After the release of the single, Aerosmith embarked on the Global Warming Tour with Cheap Trick, which took the band to two dozen North American locations from mid-June through mid-August 2012.

== Composition ==
The lyrics serve as a retrospective of the band's career. Like other songs by Aerosmith, the lyrics make reference to the band's back catalogue. The line "But we traded them toys for other joys" refers to their album Toys in the Attic and their struggles with addiction. It may also refer to the album's title track of the same name. The line "I took a chance at the high school dance never knowing wrong from right" refers to the songs "Walk This Way", one of the band's biggest hits, and "Adam's Apple" respectively. Both songs first appeared on Toys in the Attic.

== Critical reception ==
Nick Bassett of The Re-View referred to "Legendary Child" as "a brilliant single that could only be bettered if the frontman’s trademark falsetto was put to greater use."

== Music video ==
The music video for the song was originally shot on May 3, 2012, and was to feature clips of the band with footage from G.I. Joe: Retaliation mixed in. Just before performing the song on the American Idol finale on May 23, 2012, Paramount Pictures announced that G.I. Joe: Retaliation was getting delayed until 2013 so it could be converted to 3D. This resulted in a halt on the release of the music video until a decision could be made about what to do. On June 2, 2012, actress Alexa Vega announced via Twitter that she would be starring in the video and two days later, director Casey Patrick Tebo tweeted that Vega's scenes had just finished filming. Tebo continued to tweet through June that the video was done and the release date was in Sony's hands. Finally, on July 10, 2012, the music video was released via Vevo and YouTube. The video opens with voice actor Ed Weigle doing a tongue-in-cheek retrospective of the group's checkered past.

== Patriots Anthem ==
On October 20, 2012, as part of Pepsi's NFL Anthems project, Aerosmith released a rewritten version of "Legendary Child" titled, "Legendary Child - Patriots Anthem." The lyrics have been reworked as a tribute to the New England Patriots.

== Charts ==
Chart (2012)	Peak position
Canada: Active Rock (America's Music Charts)	1
US Rock Songs (Billboard)	27
US Mainstream Rock Tracks (Billboard)	17
