= Ray Tabano =

- Born: December 23, 1946 (age 79); The Bronx, New York, U.S.
- Occupation: Guitarist
- Instrument: Guitar
- Formerly of: Aerosmith

Ray Tabano (a.k.a. Crazy Raymond) (born December 23, 1946) is an American musician who was a founding member of the rock band Aerosmith in 1970.

== Career ==
Tabano was a founding member of the rock band Aerosmith, but was replaced by Brad Whitford in 1971, after which he managed the band's office, hangout, and recording studio, known as The Wherehouse. Tabano started the band's fan club and line of merchandise, designing and selling merchandise himself and writing the band's fan club newsletters. He was fired in 1979, by Aerosmith's managers Steve Leber and David Krebs.

=== Steven Tyler ===
Tabano was a childhood friend of Aerosmith lead singer Steven Tyler in their hometown of Yonkers in New York. The two founded Tyler's first music band, The Strangeurs.

=== The Strangeurs ===
Originally called the Strangers, the Strangeurs added a "u" to their name to avoid confusion with another band called the Strangers. The band consisted of Ray Tabano on bass guitar, Steven Tyler on drums, Green Mountain Boys member Don Soloman on keyboards and vocals, Peter Stahl on guitar, Alan Strohmayer on bass, and Barry Shapiro on drums. The Strangeurs played in the local area as a cover band. The band focused on Top 40 hits and earned a steady wage as a party band around the New England area.

=== Post-Aerosmith ===
As of September 2009, Tabano was running a catering company in Yonkers, New York.

In 2014, Tabano was featured on an episode of Pawn Stars, where he sold two prototype Aerosmith tour T-shirts to Rick Harrison. One was signed by the band; the other had both Tyler and Tabano's names on the sizing tag. Tabano originally asked $3,000 for both shirts. After having them appraised, however, he reduced his asking price to $1,400, and Harrison talked him into selling them for $1,100.

In 2018, Tabano was featured on an episode of American Pickers, where he authenticated an International Harvester Metro Van as having been used by Aerosmith in the early days of the band's career. The van was purchased by the show's Mike Wolfe for $25,000, after which the van was restored on behalf of the band, who then bought it back.
