= Steven Tyler =

American singer and songwriter (born 1948)

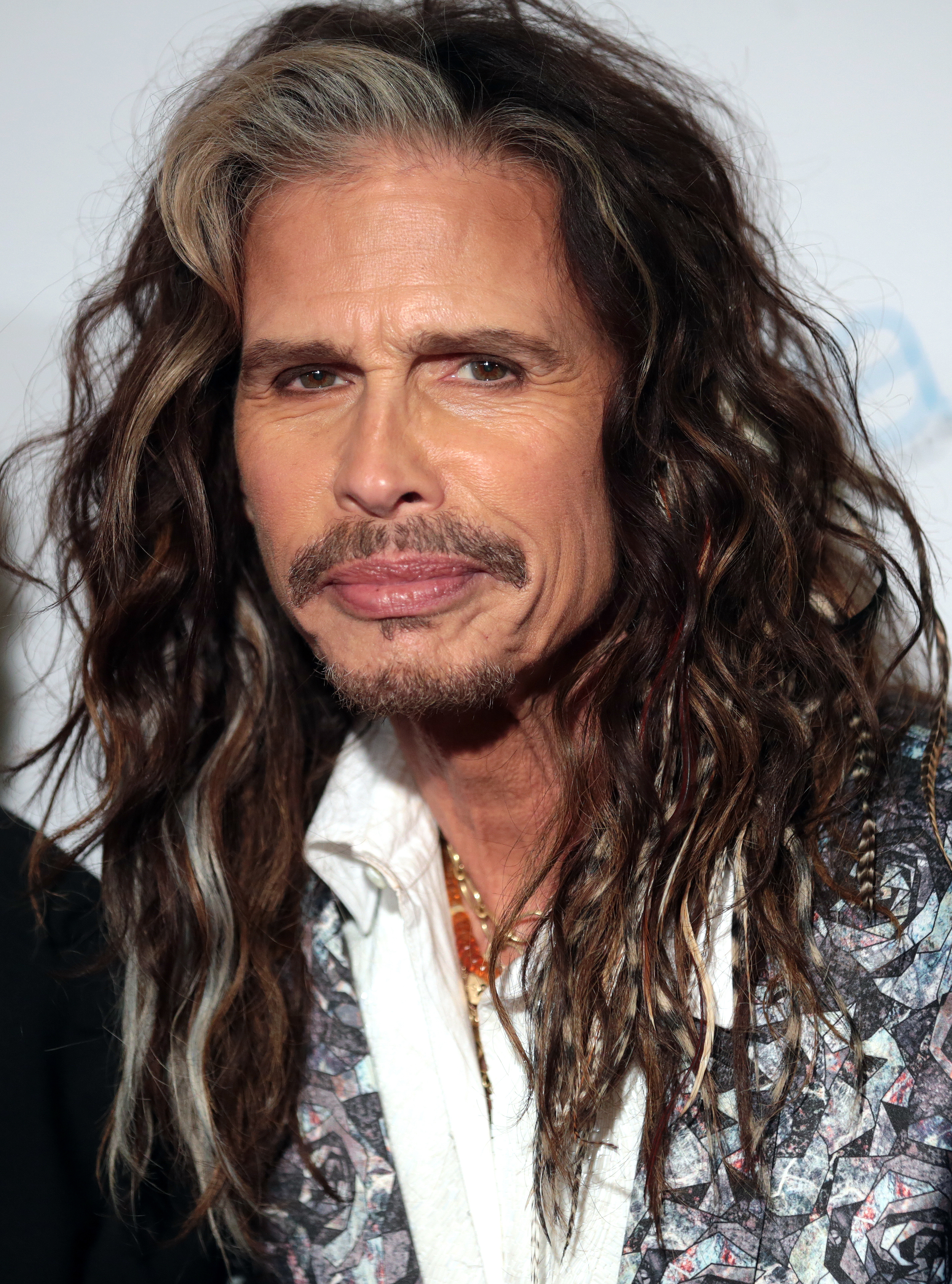
- Tyler in 2018
- Born: Steven Victor Tallarico; March 26, 1948 (age 78); New York City, U.S.
- Other name: The Demon of Screamin'
- Occupations: Singer; songwriter; musician; actor; television personality
- Years active: 1964–present
- Spouses: Cyrinda Foxe (m. 1978; div. 1987); Teresa Barrick (m. 1988; div. 2006)
- Children: 4, including Liv and Mia
- Relatives: Jon Foster (son-in-law)
- Musical career
- Genres: Hard rock; heavy metal; blues rock; glam metal; country rock
- Instruments: Vocals; keyboards; harmonica; drums; percussion; guitar
- Member of: Aerosmith
- Formerly of: Chain Reaction
- Website: Official website

Steven Victor Tallarico (born March 26, 1948), known professionally as Steven Tyler, is an American singer and songwriter. Tyler is best known as the lead singer of the Boston-based rock band Aerosmith, in which he also plays the keyboards, harmonica, and percussion. He has been called the "Demon of Screamin'" due to his powerful high screams and his wide vocal range. He is also known for his on-stage acrobatics. During live performances, Tyler is known for dressing in colorful, sometimes androgynous outfits and makeup with his trademark scarves hanging from his microphone stand.

In the 1970s, Tyler rose to prominence as the lead singer of Aerosmith, which released such hard rock albums as Toys in the Attic and Rocks as well as a string of hit singles, including "Dream On", "Sweet Emotion" and "Walk This Way". By the late 1970s and early 1980s, Tyler had become addicted to drugs and alcohol, and the band's popularity waned. In 1986, Tyler completed drug rehabilitation and Aerosmith rose to prominence again when Tyler and Joe Perry joined Run-DMC for a re-make of "Walk This Way", which became a Top 5 hit. Aerosmith subsequently launched a comeback, and its multi-platinum albums Permanent Vacation, Pump, Get a Grip and Nine Lives produced a combined thirteen Top 40 singles and won the band numerous awards. In 2016, Tyler released his debut solo album, We're All Somebody from Somewhere, a country rock album that included the single "Love Is Your Name".

Tyler is included in Rolling Stone's list of the 100 greatest singers of all time. In 2001, he was inducted into the Rock and Roll Hall of Fame with Aerosmith, In 2013, Tyler and his songwriting partner Joe Perry received the ASCAP Founders Award and were inducted into the Songwriters Hall of Fame.

== Early life and education ==
Steven Victor Tallarico was born on March 26, 1948, at the Stuyvesant Polyclinic in East Village, Manhattan, New York, and moved to the Bronx when he was three years old. The family relocated to 100 Pembrook Drive in Northeast Yonkers in 1957 when he was about nine years old. Tallarico is the son of Susan Ray (née Blancha; June 2, 1925 – July 4, 2008), a secretary, and Victor A. Tallarico (May 14, 1916 – September 10, 2011), a classical musician and pianist who taught music at Cardinal Spellman High School in the Bronx.

Tyler's father was of Italian and German descent, while his mother was of Polish, English and African-American ancestry. He has claimed on a number of occasions that his maternal grandfather was Ukrainian, and changed his surname from "Czarnyszewicz" (from Polish: czarny, lit. 'black') to "Blancha" (possibly from French: blanche, lit. 'white'). Genealogist Megan Smolenyak established that Steven Tyler's grandfather was Polish, born Felix Czarnyszewicz in 1892 in Klichaw, in today's Belarus. In 1914 he emigrated to the U.S. and changed his surname to Blancha. There he married Bessie Elliott, with whom he had four children, including Steven's mother Susan. Felix's brother was Florian Czarnyszewicz, a well-known Polish writer who emigrated to Argentina. Florian Czarnyszewicz is best known for his novel Nadberezeńcy which describes the fate of Poles living in the lands between the Berezina and Dnieper rivers between 1911 and 1920.

His paternal grandfather, Giovanni Tallarico, was from Cotronei, Calabria, Italy. Tyler learned on the genealogy show Who Do You Think You Are? that his maternal great-great-great-grandfather Robert Elliot was part African American and part European American. Steven has one older sister named Lynda.

Tyler attended Roosevelt High School on Tuckahoe Road in Yonkers, New York, which was about a mile from his house, but was expelled from the school just before graduation due to marijuana use. He later graduated from Quintano School for Young Professionals.

At 17, Tyler spent time in Greenwich Village, New York, the highlight of which was seeing a Rolling Stones concert. Tyler states that he and his friends "hung around for a while, buzzing like crazy just because we got to touch them." He added, "Everybody told me that I looked just like Mick Jagger with my big lips and Keith Richards basically was the music I used to love more than anything." A photo in the band's autobiography Walk This Way shows Tyler standing behind Mick Jagger outside a hotel.

During this period, Tyler sang backing vocals on The Left Banke Too, the second album by baroque pop group the Left Banke.

== Career ==
=== The Strangeurs ===
In 1964, Tyler formed a band called the Strangeurs—later Chain Reaction—in Yonkers, New York.

=== Formation and success of Aerosmith (1970–1978) ===
Before forming Aerosmith, Tyler wrote what would become one of Aerosmith's signature songs, "Dream On". In 1969, Tyler attended a local rock show in Sunapee, New Hampshire. While there, he saw future bandmates Joe Perry (guitars) and Tom Hamilton (bass) playing in a band called the Jam Band. Tyler later stated he was struck by their raw power and attitude.

Around 1970, Tyler, Perry and Hamilton decided to form a band. Tyler, who had played drums in many of his previous bands while in school, insisted that he would be the frontman and lead singer. Joey Kramer, an old acquaintance of Tyler's from New York, was recruited to play the drums. Driven by a collective ambition to launch their careers as full-time musicians and hopeful recording artists, the band moved to the Boston area.

The band moved into a home together at 1325 Commonwealth Avenue in Boston, where they wrote and rehearsed music together and relaxed in between shows. The members of the band reportedly spent afternoons getting high and watching Three Stooges reruns. One day, they met to try to come up with a name. Kramer said that, when he was in school, he would write the word "aerosmith" all over his notebooks. The name had popped into his head after listening to Harry Nilsson's album Aerial Ballet, which featured jacket art of a circus performer jumping out of a biplane. Initially, Kramer's bandmates were unimpressed; they all thought he was referring to the Sinclair Lewis novel they were required to read in high school English class. "No, not Arrowsmith," Kramer explained. "A-E-R-O...Aerosmith." The band settled upon this name after also considering "the Hookers" and "Spike Jones". At some point prior to the weekend of December 25, 1971, they were known as "Fox Chase".

Soon, the band hired Ray Tabano, a childhood friend of Tyler, as rhythm guitarist and began playing local shows. Aerosmith played their first gig in Mendon, Massachusetts, at Nipmuc Regional High School (now Miscoe Hill Middle School) on November 6, 1970. In 1971, Tabano was replaced by Brad Whitford, who also attended the Berklee School of Music, and was formerly a member of the band Earth Inc. Whitford, from Reading, Massachusetts, had played at Reading's AW Coolidge Middle School. Other than a period from July 1979 to April 1984, the line-up of Tyler, Perry, Hamilton, Kramer, and Whitford has stayed the same.

Aerosmith signed with Columbia in mid-1972 for a reported $125,000 and recorded their debut album, Aerosmith. Released in January 1973, the album peaked at number 166. The album was straightforward rock and roll with well-defined blues influences, laying the groundwork for Aerosmith's signature blues rock sound. Although the highest-charting single from the album was "Dream On" at number 59, several tracks, such as "Mama Kin" and "Walkin' the Dog", would become staples of the band's live shows, and received airplay on rock radio. The album reached gold status initially, eventually went on to sell two million copies, and was certified double platinum after the band reached mainstream success over a decade later. After constant touring, the band released their second album, Get Your Wings in 1974, the first of a string of multi-platinum albums produced by Jack Douglas. This album included the rock radio hits "Same Old Song and Dance" and "Train Kept A-Rollin'", a cover done previously by the Yardbirds.

In 1975, Aerosmith released their third album, Toys in the Attic. Similarly to fellow Leber-Krebs act New York Dolls, Aerosmith had been derided by music critics as Rolling Stones knockoffs, in part due to the physical resemblance between Tyler and Mick Jagger, Toys in the Attic showed that Aerosmith was a unique and talented band in their own right. Toys in the Attic was an immediate success, starting with the single "Sweet Emotion", which became the band's first Top 40 hit. This was followed by a successful re-release of "Dream On" which hit No. 6, becoming their best charting single of the 1970s. "Walk This Way", re-released in 1976, reached the Top 10 in early 1977.

In 1976, Aerosmith's fourth album, Rocks, was released. Music historian Greg Prato described it as "captur[ing] Aerosmith at their most raw and rocking". It went platinum swiftly and featured two Top 40 hits, "Last Child" and "Back in the Saddle", as well as the ballad "Home Tonight", which also charted.

In 1977, Aerosmith released their fifth album, Draw the Line. Its recording was affected by the band's excesses, but several of its songs nevertheless became fan favourites. The title track charted just shy of the Top 40 and remains a live staple, and "Kings and Queens" also charted. Additionally, the track "Bright Light Fright" was the first Aerosmith song to feature a song without Tyler on lead vocals, with lead guitarist Perry instead taking the reins due to Tyler's lack of enthusiasm for the song.

=== Decline of Aerosmith (1979–1983) ===
As the decade wore on, the fast-paced life of touring, recording, living together and using drugs began to take its toll on the band. Tyler and Perry often were called the Toxic Twins for their legendary intake of stimulants and heroin.

Night in the Ruts was released in November 1979, but managed to sell only enough records to be certified gold at the time, although it would eventually sell enough copies to be certified platinum by 1994. The only single the album spawned, a cover of "Remember (Walking in the Sand)" by the Shangri-Las, peaked at number 67 on the Billboard Hot 100. The tour for Night in the Ruts commenced shortly thereafter, but the band found themselves playing in smaller and smaller venues than before because their popularity was beginning to wane. Tyler's drug issues were starting to affect his performance and songwriting, and he reached rock bottom in 1980 when he collapsed on stage during a show in Portland, Maine and did not get up for the remainder of the set. Also in 1980, Aerosmith released their first compilation album, Greatest Hits. While the compilation didn't chart very high initially, it gained popularity later, and went on to become the band's best selling album in the United States, with sales of 12 million copies. In the fall of 1980, Tyler was injured in a serious motorcycle accident, which left him hospitalized for two months and unable to tour or record well into 1981.

Rock in a Hard Place was released on August 27, 1982. The album reached number 32 on the Billboard 200 album chart. Only one single charted, the aforementioned "Lightning Strikes", which peaked at number 21 on the Billboard Mainstream Rock chart. As with the tour for Night in the Ruts, Aerosmith was unable to book larger venues, and instead had to rely on filling clubs and theaters. At a homecoming arena show in Worcester, Massachusetts, Tyler and Perry got high backstage before the show. Tyler was so intoxicated that he collapsed onstage again.

In 1984, Aerosmith embarked on a reunion tour called the Back in the Saddle Tour, which led to the live album Classics Live II. While concerts on the tour were well-attended, it was plagued with several incidents, mostly attributed to drug abuse by band members. With their drug problems still not behind them, the group was signed to Geffen Records and began working on a comeback.

In 1985, the band released the album Done with Mirrors. While the album did receive some positive reviews, it only went gold and failed to produce a hit single or generate any widespread interest. Nevertheless, the band became a popular concert attraction once again, touring in support of Done with Mirrors, well into 1986.

In 1986, in an unprecedented crossover collaboration, Aerosmith (largely the additional contributions of leaders Tyler and Perry) appeared on Run–D.M.C.'s cover of "Walk This Way", a track blending rock and roll with hip hop. In reaching number 4 on the Billboard Hot 100, the song and its frequently-aired video resurrected Aerosmith's career by introducing the band's music to a new generation.

In 1986, Tyler completed a successful drug rehabilitation program after an intervention by his fellow band members, a doctor, and manager Tim Collins. The rest of the band members also completed drug rehab programs over the course of the next couple of years.

=== Comeback and superstardom (1986–1999) ===
Permanent Vacation was released in August 1987, becoming a major hit and the band's bestselling album in over a decade (selling 5 million copies in the U.S.), with all three of its singles ("Dude (Looks Like a Lady)", "Angel", and "Rag Doll") reaching the Top 20 of the Billboard Hot 100. Tyler revealed in his autobiography that the album was "...the first one we ever did sober." The group went on a subsequent tour with labelmates Guns N' Roses (who have cited Aerosmith as a major influence), which was intense at times because of Aerosmith's new struggle to stay clean amidst Guns N' Roses' well-publicized, rampant drug use.

Aerosmith's next album was even more successful. Pump, released in September 1989, featured three Top Ten singles: "Love in an Elevator", "Janie's Got a Gun", and "What It Takes", as well as the Top 30 "The Other Side", re-establishing the band as a serious musical force. Pump was a critical and commercial success, eventually selling 7 million copies, spawning several music videos that were in regular rotation on MTV, and achieving four-star ratings from major music magazines. Pump ranked as the fourth-bestselling album of 1990. The band also won its first Grammy in the category of Best Rock Performance by a Duo or Group with Vocal, for "Janie's Got a Gun". In addition, the video for "Janie's Got a Gun" won two Video Music Awards and was ranked as one of the 100 greatest videos of all time by Rolling Stone, MTV, and VH1. In support of Pump, the band embarked on the 12-month Pump Tour, which lasted for most of 1990.

On February 21, 1990, the band appeared in a "Wayne's World" sketch on Saturday Night Live debating the fall of communism and the Soviet Union; they also performed their recent hits "Janie's Got a Gun" and "Monkey on My Back". The appearance of the band in the "Wayne's World" sketch was later ranked by E! as the number-one moment in the history of the program.

On August 11, 1990, the band's performance on MTV's Unplugged aired. In October 1990, the Pump Tour ended, with the band's first ever performances in Australia. That same year, the band was also inducted to the Hollywood Rock Walk.

The band took a brief break before recording their follow-up to Pump in 1992. Despite significant shifts in mainstream music at the beginning of the 1990s, 1993's Get a Grip was just as successful commercially, becoming their first album to debut at number 1 and racking up sales of 7 million copies in a two-and-a-half-year timespan and over 20 million copies worldwide. The first singles were the hard rocking "Livin' on the Edge" and "Eat the Rich". Though many critics were unimpressed by the focus on the subsequent interchangeable power-ballads in promoting the album, all three ("Cryin'", "Amazing", and "Crazy") proved to be huge successes on radio and MTV. Tyler's daughter, Liv Tyler, was featured in the "Crazy" video. The band won two Grammy Awards for songs from this album in the category of Best Rock Performance by a Duo or Group with Vocal: for "Livin' on the Edge" in 1994 and "Crazy" in 1995.

Nine Lives was released in March 1997. Reviews were mixed, and Nine Lives initially fell down the charts, although it had a long chart life and sold double platinum in the United States alone, fueled by its singles, "Falling in Love (Is Hard on the Knees)", the ballad "Hole in My Soul", and the crossover-pop smash "Pink" (which won the band their fourth Grammy Award in 1999 in the Best Rock Performance by a Duo or Group with Vocal category). It was followed by the over two-year-long Nine Lives Tour, which was plagued by problems including Tyler injuring his leg at a concert.

In 1998, in the midst of setbacks during the Nine Lives Tour, the band released the single "I Don't Want to Miss a Thing". The song is a love song written by Diane Warren for the 1998 film Armageddon, which starred Liv Tyler. The song became Aerosmith's first and only number 1 single when it debuted at the top position on the Billboard Hot 100 and stayed on top of the charts for four weeks. The song was nominated for an Academy Award in 1999.

=== Continued success and touring (2000–2008) ===
The band entered their next decade by co-headlining with NSYNC the Super Bowl XXXV halftime show, titled "The Kings of Rock and Pop", with appearances from Britney Spears, Mary J. Blige and Nelly.

In March 2001, the band released their 13th studio album Just Push Play, which quickly went platinum, fueled by the Top 10 single "Jaded" and the appearance of the title track in Dodge commercials. They were inducted to the Rock and Roll Hall of Fame soon after their album was released, in late March 2001. Later that year, the band performed as part of the United We Stand: What More Can I Give benefit concert in Washington D.C. for 9/11 victims and their families.

The band started 2002 by ending the Just Push Play tour, and simultaneously recording segments for their Behind the Music special on VH1, which not only chronicled the band's history but also the band's current activities and touring. The special was one of the few Behind the Musics to run two hours in length. MTV honored Aerosmith with their mtvICON award in 2002.

Aerosmith's long-promised blues album Honkin' on Bobo was released in 2004. This was a return to the band's roots, including recording the album in live sessions, working with former producer Jack Douglas, and laying down their blues rock grit.

In October 2005, Aerosmith released a CD/DVD Rockin' the Joint. The band hit the road for the Rockin' the Joint Tour on October 30 with Lenny Kravitz for a fall/winter tour of arenas in the largest U.S. markets. The band planned to tour with Cheap Trick in the spring, hitting secondary markets in the U.S. Almost all of this leg of the tour was canceled, however. Dates were initially canceled one by one until March 22, 2006, when it was announced that Tyler needed throat surgery, and the remaining dates on the tour were subsequently canceled.

Tyler and Perry performed with the Boston Pops Orchestra for their annual concert of July 4 on the Esplanade in 2006, a milestone as it was the first major event or performance since Steven Tyler's throat surgery. Around this time, the band also announced that they would embark on the Route of All Evil Tour with Mötley Crüe in late 2006.

In early 2007, the band announced a new World Tour, their first for nearly a decade to include dates outside North America or Japan.

On July 18, 2008, Tyler appeared with Billy Joel at the last concert to be played at Shea Stadium. Backed by Joel's band, he sang lead vocals on "Walk This Way". In August 2008, HarperCollins won an auction to publish Tyler's autobiography. That same month, Tyler performed with trumpeter Chris Botti in Boston. The concert was released as a CD/DVD, Chris Botti In Boston in March 2009. In December 2008, Tyler made a surprise appearance at the Trans-Siberian Orchestra concerts at Nassau Coliseum (December 12, 2008) and the Izod Center (December 13, 2008). At the Izod Center, he collaborated with the Trans-Siberian Orchestra on "Dream On" and "Sweet Emotion".

=== Touring, American Idol and albums (2009–2014) ===
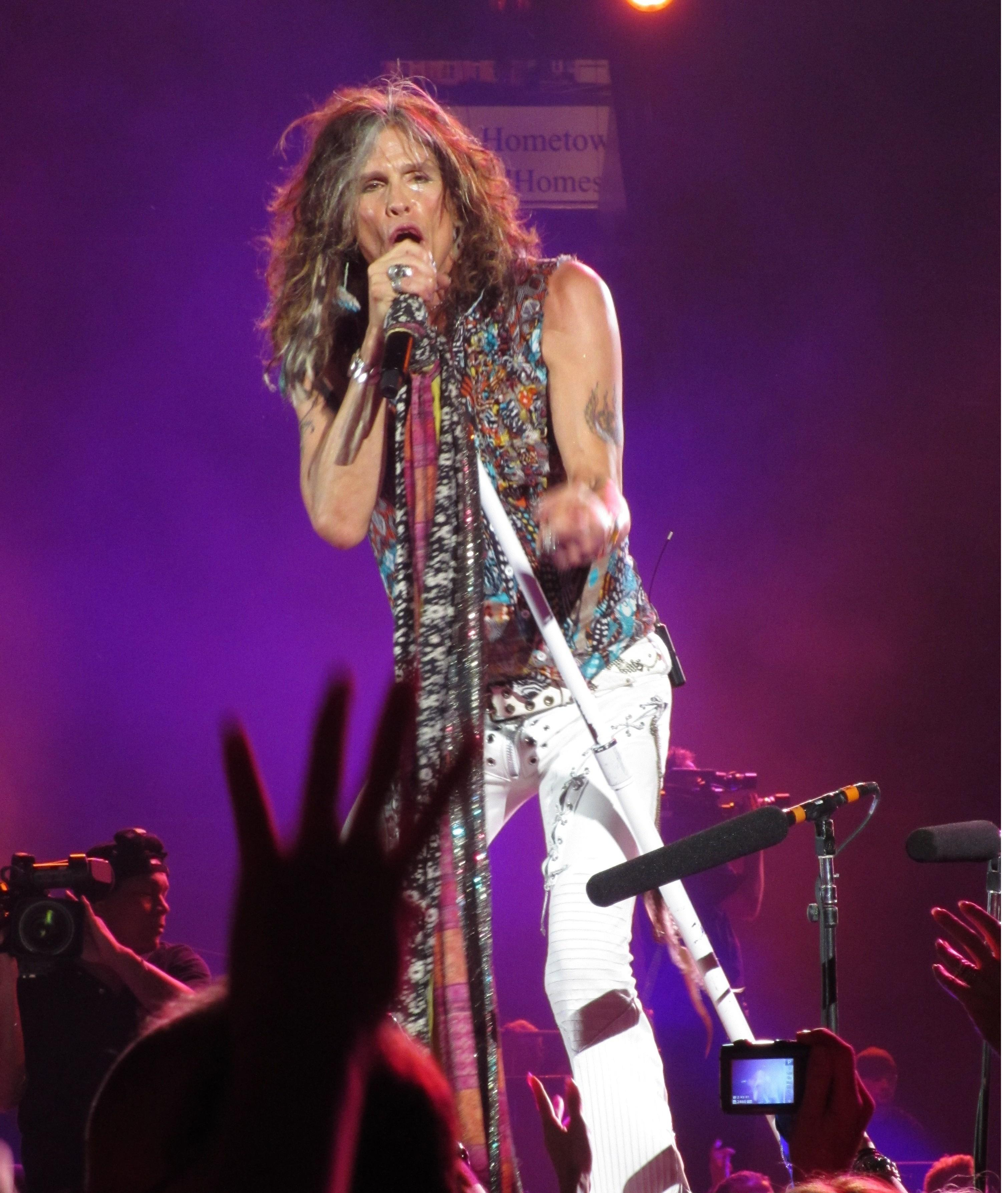
Tyler performing with Aerosmith in July 2012

On August 5, 2009, while on the Guitar Hero Aerosmith Tour, Tyler fell off a stage near Sturgis, South Dakota and was hospitalized.

On November 9, 2009, the media reported that Tyler had no contact with the other members of Aerosmith and that they were unsure if he was still in the band. On November 10, 2009, Joe Perry confirmed Tyler had quit Aerosmith to pursue a solo career and was unsure whether the move was indefinite. No replacement was announced. Despite rumors of leaving the band, and notwithstanding Perry's comment as reported earlier the same day, Tyler joined the Joe Perry Project onstage November 10, 2009, at the Fillmore New York at Irving Plaza and performed "Walk This Way". According to sources at the event, Tyler assured the crowd that despite rumors to the contrary, he is "not quitting Aerosmith."

In 2010, Tyler embarked on the Cocked, Locked, Ready to Rock Tour with Aerosmith, which had them perform over 40 concerts in 18 countries. On September 16, 2010, it was reported he would have his first solo project. He wrote "Love Lives", a theme song for the Japanese sci-fi movie Space Battleship Yamato. The song was based on the English translated script, as well as on some clips of the film itself. The single was released on November 24, a week before the movie was released.

On September 22, 2010, Fox confirmed that Tyler would replace Simon Cowell as a judge for the tenth season of American Idol alongside Randy Jackson and fellow new judge Jennifer Lopez (who replaced Kara DioGuardi and Ellen DeGeneres).

On January 19, 2011, Tyler made his debut appearance as a judge on American Idol during the premiere of the show's 10th season, which aired through the end of May. On April 2, 2011, Tyler presented an award at the 2011 Kids' Choice Awards. The following day, he performed with Carrie Underwood at the Academy of Country Music Awards. Underwood and Tyler performed Underwood's song "Undo It" and completed their segment with an energetic version of the Aerosmith classic "Walk This Way". On May 3, 2011, he released his autobiography Does the Noise in My Head Bother You?, which reached number two on The New York Times Best Seller List in the category Hardcover Non-fiction.

On October 22, 2011, Tyler set off for an 18-date Aerosmith tour across Latin America and Japan. On October 25, it was reported by TMZ that Tyler slipped in his hotel shower in Paraguay and injured his face. The band's scheduled show was postponed for the following night. When he did finally perform after the opening song, he proudly displayed his broken tooth which he had on a string around his neck. He then removed his sunglasses to reveal a nasty black eye.

Tyler performing "Dream On" on the piano at an Aerosmith concert in Chicago in June 2012

On January 22, 2012, Tyler sang the National Anthem at the AFC Championship Game. On March 11, 2012, a special about Aerosmith aired on 60 Minutes, where some of the comments made by the band members highlighted the still-contentious relationships in the band. On March 22, Perry surprised Tyler with a performance of "Happy Birthday" on American Idol in advance of Tyler's 64th birthday. On March 26, 2012, Aerosmith announced their "Global Warming Tour" with dates in many major North American cities from June 16 to August 8, preceded by a performance on May 30 for Walmart shareholders. In April, a Burger King television commercial featuring Tyler debuted. Aerosmith's new album, Music from Another Dimension! was set for release on November 6, 2012 and the band debuted their new single "Legendary Child" with a performance of the song on the season finale of American Idol on May 23.

On July 12, 2012, Tyler announced that he would be leaving American Idol after two seasons. Tyler has since indicated that his troubles with his bandmates were the primary reason he signed up to do American Idol. He was replaced by Keith Urban.

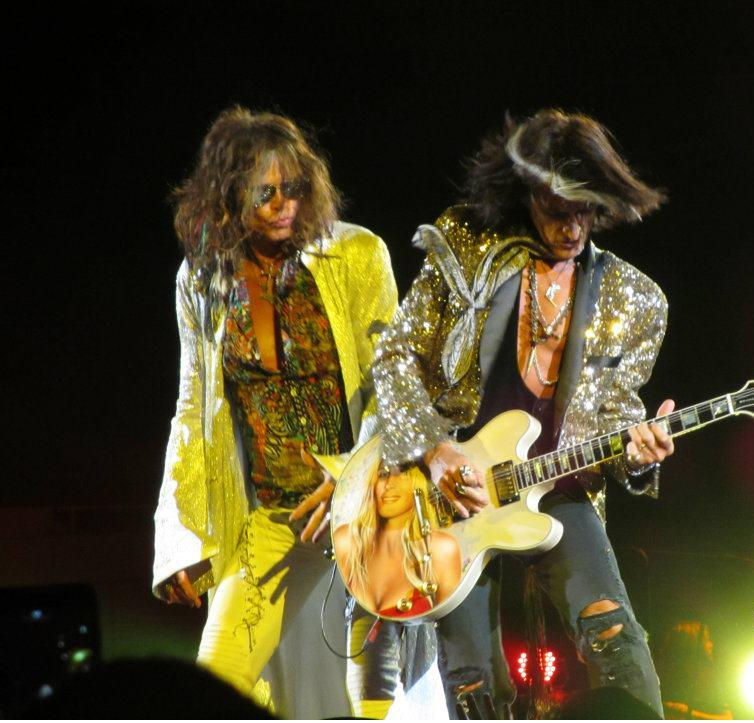
Steven Tyler (left) and Joe Perry (right) performing at the Nassau Coliseum on July 1, 2012

On August 12, Aerosmith wrapped up the first leg of their Global Warming Tour with a rescheduled performance in Bristow, Virginia, and on August 28, the band released two singles simultaneously, the rocker "Lover Alot" and the ballad "What Could Have Been Love", both of which were coproduced and cowritten by Tyler. On September 22, Aerosmith performed at the iHeartRadio music festival in Las Vegas. On November 6, the new Aerosmith album Music from Another Dimension! was released, and on November 8, the band began the second leg of their Global Warming Tour, which took the band to 14 North American cities through December 13. On January 21, 2013, Aerosmith released "Can't Stop Lovin' You" (featuring Carrie Underwood) as the fourth single from Music from Another Dimension!.

On February 20, it was announced that Tyler and his songwriting partner Joe Perry would be recipients of the ASCAP Founders Award at the society's 30th Annual Pop Music Awards on April 17. Two days later, it was announced that the duo would be inducted into the Songwriters Hall of Fame at a ceremony to be held on June 13.

In late April and early May 2013, Aerosmith extended their Global Warming Tour to Australia, New Zealand, the Philippines and Singapore. This marked the band's first performances in Australia in 23 years, and the band's first-ever performances in the latter three countries. On May 30, Aerosmith performed as part of the "Boston Strong" charity concert for victims of the Boston Marathon bombing. The band also performed at a handful of shows in the U.S. and Japan in July and August In the fall of 2013, Aerosmith extended their tour to Central and South America, including their first-ever performances in Guatemala, El Salvador and Uruguay.

From May 17 to June 28, 2014, Tyler performed 15 shows with Aerosmith on the European leg of the Global Warming Tour. This was followed by the Let Rock Rule Tour (featuring Slash with Myles Kennedy and the Conspirators as the opening act), which sent Aerosmith to 19 locations across North America from July 10 to September 12.

=== Solo album and touring with Aerosmith (2015–present) ===
Tyler performing with backing band Loving Mary on his solo "Out on a Limb Tour" in Chicago, Illinois on August 13, 2016

On March 31, 2015, Tyler stated that he was working on his first solo country album. On April 6, it was announced that he signed a record deal with Scott Borchetta's Dot Records (a division of the Big Machine Label Group). On May 13, Tyler released the lead single, "Love Is Your Name", from his forthcoming debut album. He promoted the song on the Bobby Bones Show, iHeartMedia, CBS This Morning, Entertainment Tonight and the American Idol fourteenth-season finale. To increase his exposure to the country audience, Tyler appeared as himself in an episode of the musical drama series Nashville, performing a cover of "Crazy" with Juliette Barnes (portrayed by Hayden Panettiere).

On June 13, Tyler rejoined his Aerosmith bandmates for the Blue Army Tour, which sent the band to 17 North American locations through August 7; this was followed by a one-off performance in Moscow on September 5. From the fall of 2015 through the spring of 2016, Tyler completed work on his solo album, We're All Somebody from Somewhere, which was released on July 15, 2016. A second single, "Red, White & You", was released in January 2016, followed by the third single (the title track) in June 2016.

Since December 2015, in various interviews, Tyler and fellow Aerosmith bandmates Brad Whitford and Joe Perry all began discussing the possibility of an Aerosmith farewell tour or "wind-down tour", potentially slated to start in 2017. Perry has suggested that such a tour could last for two years while Tyler said it could potentially last "forever"; Tyler and Whitford also discussed the potential of doing a final studio album.

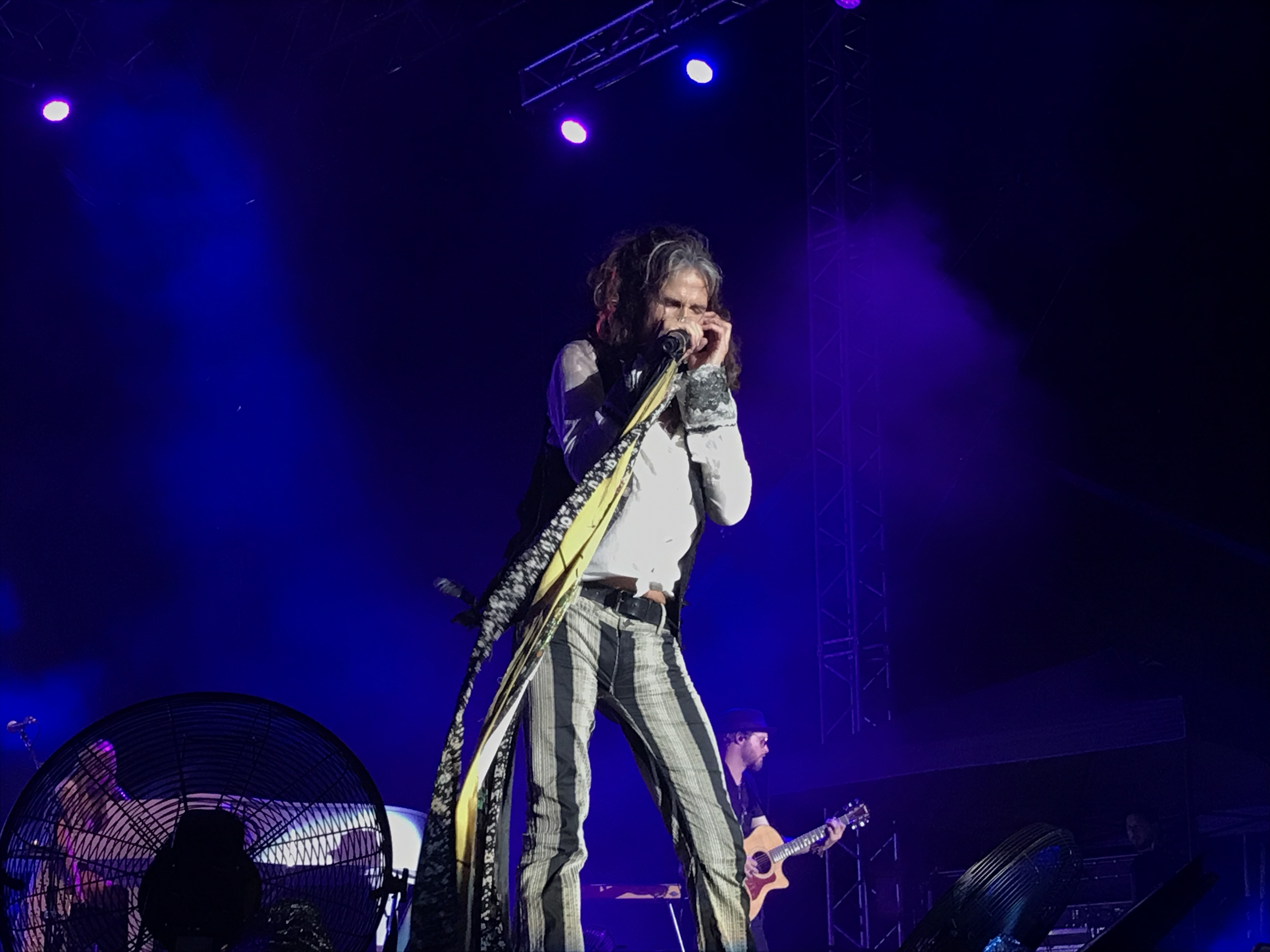
Tyler performing in Thackerville, Oklahoma on August 25, 2017

From September through October 2016, Tyler rejoined Aerosmith for a nine-date tour of Latin America, called the Rock 'N' Roll Rumble Tour, preceded by a performance at the Kaaboo Festival in San Diego.

In April 2017, Tyler performed with Aerosmith in Phoenix, Arizona for the NCAA Final Four men's basketball tournament and also performed two solo shows with Loving Mary in Japan. Tyler rejoined Aerosmith for a "farewell" tour of Europe in the spring and summer of 2017, titled the Aero-Vederci Baby! Tour. After the European leg concluded in July, the band played in South America in September and October 2017.

On August 15, Tyler appeared with Aerosmith on NBC's Today show to announce a residency in Las Vegas called "Deuces Are Wild", a reference to both Las Vegas casino gambling and their 1994 single of the same name. The band was booked to play 50 shows from April 2019 thru June 2020 at the Park Theater. In July and August 2019, it performed at a festival in Minnesota and played nine shows at three MGM venues in Maryland, New Jersey and Massachusetts.

In March 2022, Aerosmith announced the return of the Deuces Are Wild residency, which was set to begin in June. On May 24, 2022, the band announced that the June and July dates would be canceled due to Tyler checking himself into a rehab facility. The band shared that Tyler relapsed after having foot surgery to prepare for the upcoming shows.

In August 2024, Aerosmith announced the band's retirement from touring due to Tyler being unable to fully recover from vocal cord injures and a fractured larynx sustained during a September 2023 concert.

== Dirico Motorcycles (Red Wing Motorcycles) ==
On September 15, 2007, at New Hampshire International Speedway, Tyler announced the launch of Dirico Motorcycles, which are designed by Tyler, engineered by Mark Dirico, and built by AC Custom Motorcycles in Manchester, New Hampshire. Tyler has been a long-time motorcycle fan and riding enthusiast, Tyler also participates in a variety of charity auctions involving motorcycles, including the Ride for Children charity.

== Politics ==
In the early months of 2013, an act was forwarded into the Hawaii legislature entitled the Steven Tyler Act (Hawaii Senate Bill 465). The act would give more privacy to public figures such as government officials and celebrities on vacation. Tyler and numerous other celebrities all lobbied for it. The legislation would give public figures the right to sue paparazzi for taking unwanted photographs. The bill's sponsor is Maui state legislator J. Kalani English. The bill was cleared through the Judiciary Committee on Friday, February 8, 2013.

In August 2015, Aerosmith attended the first Republican Party presidential debate held in Cleveland, as the band was in town for a Pro Bowl concert appearance. Tyler was reportedly a guest of candidate Donald Trump, rather than sitting with the band. Tyler's agent told reporters that he was there to promote his copyright reform ideas.

== Personal life ==
=== Persona ===
Tyler has been known to have an androgynous persona both on and offstage such as flamboyant clothes and makeup. In his 2011 memoir Does the Noise in My Head Bother You?, Tyler wrote:

I've been misquoted as saying that I'm more female than male. Let me set the record straight—it's more half and half, and I love the fact that my feelings are akin to puella eternis [sic] (Latin for "the eternal girl"). What better to be like than the stronger of the species?

— Steven Tyler, Does the Noise in My Head Bother You? (2011)

=== Family and relationships ===
Tyler had a brief relationship with fashion model Bebe Buell, during which he fathered actress Liv Tyler, born in 1977. Buell initially claimed that the father was Todd Rundgren to protect her daughter from Tyler's drug addiction. Through Liv's marriage to British musician Royston Langdon and relationship with entertainment manager David Gardner, Tyler has three grandchildren.

In 1978, he married Cyrinda Foxe, an ex-Warhol model and the former wife of New York Dolls lead singer David Johansen, and fathered model Mia Tyler (born on December 22, 1978). He and Foxe divorced in 1987; in 1997, she published Dream On: Livin' on the Edge with Steven Tyler and Aerosmith, a memoir of her life with Tyler. Foxe died from a brain tumor in 2002.

On May 28, 1988, in Tulsa, Oklahoma, Tyler married clothing designer Teresa Barrick. With Barrick, he fathered a daughter, Chelsea, born around 1989 and a son, Taj, born around 1991. In February 2005, the couple announced that they were separating due to personal problems. The divorce was finalized in January 2006.

Tyler began a relationship with Erin Brady in 2006. They got engaged in December 2011 but called it off in January 2013.

==== Julia Holcomb ====
In 1973, Tyler obtained guardianship of 16-year-old Julia Holcomb so that she could live with him in Boston. They dated and took drugs together for three years. Holcomb was referred to by the pseudonym "Diana Hall" by the editor of the Aerosmith autobiography Walk This Way in an attempt to conceal her identity, but other sources have confirmed her identity. Pressures leading to their split included their age difference (Tyler was 25 when they first met), a withdrawn marriage proposal, a house fire, and a planned pregnancy that resulted in an abortion when Tyler was worried that the smoke from the fire, as well as drugs, might lead to birth defects. Look Away, a documentary about sexual abuse in the rock music industry, features Holcomb's story.

Band member Ray Tabano wrote in Walk This Way that the abortion "really messed Steven up", because the fetus was male. Tyler wrote, "It was a big crisis. It's a major thing when you're growing something with a woman, but they convinced us that it would never work out and would ruin our lives. You go to the doctor and they put the needle in her belly and they squeeze the stuff in and you watch. And it comes out dead. I was pretty devastated. In my mind, I'm going, Jesus, what have I done?" Holcomb stated in 2011 that after the operation, Tyler had informed her that the child "had been born alive and allowed to die".

Holcomb, who later took the name "Julia Misley", filed suit in December 2022, alleging that Tyler sexually assaulted her and forced her to undergo the abortion, plying her with drugs and alcohol after promising to care for her in the guardianship agreement. In February 2023, Tyler was officially named a defendant in the lawsuit, which also claimed he used his fame and status to "groom, manipulate, exploit, [and] sexually assault" Misley over the course of three years, beginning when she was 16 and he was in his mid-20s. In a motion to dismiss the lawsuit that was filed in March 2023, Tyler claimed their relationship was consensual and that he had immunity because he was her legal guardian at the time. The motion further stated that Tyler's actions with regard to the abortion decision were legitimate, justified, and in good faith. Tyler's 2023 denial of sexual assault and claim of immunity has drawn scrutiny and has perplexed several attorneys who were experts in the field of sexual assault. On reviewing Tyler's answer to the suit launched against him that same year, Misley's lawyer claimed that Tyler was "gaslighting".

After the release of the documentary Look Away, it was discussed on Instagram by Courtney Love, where she supported some of the claims made, commenting that Tyler also "adopted" another 13-year-old girl in a similar fashion.

=== Health ===
Tyler and his bandmate, Joe Perry, have been referred to as the Toxic Twins for their legendary intake of stimulants and heroin.

In 1980, Tyler collapsed on stage during a show in Portland, Maine and did not get up for the remainder of the set. In the fall of 1980, Tyler was injured in a serious motorcycle accident, which left him hospitalized for two months and unable to tour or record well into 1981. At a homecoming arena show in Worcester, Massachusetts in the early 1980s, Tyler and Perry got high backstage before the show; Tyler was so intoxicated that he collapsed onstage again.

Tyler recalled, "I made like $4 or $5 million by 1979, and by '83... I lost it all. I remember in the early days looking at another fucked-up rock 'n' roll star and thinking, 'I will never end up like that, man.' They had all these riches and blew it all. That would never happen to me... I forgot about reality and just loved shooting dope and coke. Stupid."

In 1986, Tyler completed a successful drug rehabilitation program after an intervention by his fellow band members, a doctor, and manager Tim Collins.

In 2006, immediately after a two-hour performance in Florida, Tyler got into an argument during which he yelled. He awoke the next morning to find that he had a hoarse voice. On March 22, 2006, The Washington Post reported that Tyler would undergo surgery for an "undisclosed medical condition". A statement from Tyler's publicist read in part, "Despite Aerosmith's desire to keep the tour going as long as possible, [Tyler's] doctors advised him not to continue performing to give his voice time to recover." Aerosmith's remaining North American tour dates in 2006 on the Rockin' the Joint Tour were subsequently canceled.

The cause was diagnosed as a ruptured blood vessel in his throat, which was successfully sealed off using a laser by Dr. Steven M. Zeitels, director of the Massachusetts General Hospital Center for Laryngeal Surgery and Voice Rehabilitation. In the words of Tyler: "He just took a laser and zapped the blood vessel." After a few weeks of rest, Tyler and the rest of Aerosmith entered the studio on May 20, 2006, to begin work on their new album.

Tyler's first public performance after the surgery was July 3–4, 2006, with Joe Perry at the Hatch Shell in Boston, with the Boston Pops Orchestra. The duo sang "Dream On", "Walk This Way" and "I Don't Want to Miss a Thing" as part of the Boston Pops July 4 Fireworks Spectacular. Tyler's throat surgery was featured in 2007 on an episode of the National Geographic Channel series, Incredible Human Machine.

In a September 2006 interview with Access Hollywood, Tyler revealed that he had been suffering from hepatitis C for the past 11 years. He was diagnosed with the disease in 2003 and had undergone extensive treatment from 2003 to 2006, including 11 months of interferon therapy, which he said was "agony". The disease is usually spread through blood-to-blood contact, or by sharing used needles.

On May 21, 2008, Tyler checked into Las Encinas Hospital rehabilitation clinic in Pasadena, California, to recover from multiple leg surgeries. He made a public statement saying, "The 'foot repair' pain was intense, greater than I'd anticipated. The months of rehabilitative care and the painful strain of physical therapy were traumatic. I really needed a safe environment to recuperate where I could shut off my phone and get back on my feet."

On August 5, 2009, while on the Guitar Hero Aerosmith Tour, Tyler fell off a stage near Sturgis, South Dakota, injuring his head and neck and breaking his shoulder. He was airlifted to Rapid City Regional Hospital.

On October 25, 2011, it was reported by TMZ that Tyler slipped in his hotel shower in Paraguay and injured his face, including losing several teeth. Tyler was rushed to the hospital, and the scheduled show was postponed for the following night.

Tyler has publicly acknowledged his struggles with drug and alcohol addiction. In a 2019 interview, Tyler recalled: "There was a moment in '88 where management and the band pulled an intervention on me. They thought, 'Get the lead singer sober, and all our problems would be over'...I am grateful and owe a thanks to them for my sobriety". Tyler added: "I have had many times in my life where I just couldn't handle—whether it was a marriage or my addiction had reared its ugly head—and the rest of the guys in the band are not unlike that. But we have all seen each other through it, and we are here today".

On May 24, 2022, the band announced that Tyler had checked himself into a rehab facility. Tyler had relapsed after having foot surgery to prepare for the upcoming shows.

In September 2023, Tyler suffered a vocal injury during a concert from Aerosmith's farewell tour. In August 2024, the group was forced to cancel the tour and retire from touring after it was determined that Tyler could not sufficiently recover from the injury.

== Discography ==
=== Studio albums ===
Title	Album details	Peak chart positions			Sales
Title	Album details	US	AUS	CAN	Sales
We're All Somebody from Somewhere	Release date: July 15, 2016; Label: Dot Records	19	37	21	US: 50,700

=== Singles ===
Year	Title	Peak chart positions				Album
Year	Title	US	US Country	US Country Airplay	CAN	Album
1998	"I Love Trash"	—	—	—	—	Non-album singles
2010	"Love Lives"	—	—	—	—	Non-album singles
2011	"(It) Feels So Good"	35	—	—	47	Non-album singles
2015	"Love Is Your Name"	75	19	33	54	We're All Somebody from Somewhere
2016	"Red, White & You"	—	29	46	—	We're All Somebody from Somewhere
2016	"We're All Somebody from Somewhere"	—	—	—	—	We're All Somebody from Somewhere

=== Collaborative work ===
Year	Song	Artist	Album
1986	"Walk This Way"	Run-D.M.C. featuring Steven Tyler and Joe Perry	Raising Hell
1988	"Wild Thing"	Sam Kinison; guest performers include Steven Tyler	Have You Seen Me Lately?
1989	"Only My Heart Talkin'"	Alice Cooper featuring Steven Tyler	Trash
1989	"Slice of Your Pie"	Mötley Crüe; guest performers include Steven Tyler	Dr. Feelgood
1989	"Sticky Sweet"	Mötley Crüe; guest performers include Steven Tyler	Dr. Feelgood
1999	"Roots, Rock, Reggae"	Bob Marley featuring Steven Tyler	Chant Down Babylon
2001	"Misery"	Pink featuring Steven Tyler and Richie Sambora	Missundaztood
2002	"Sing for the Moment"	Eminem featuring Steven Tyler and Joe Perry (uncredited; "Dream On" sample used; New recording not done)	The Eminem Show
2004	"I'm a King Bee"	Steven Tyler and Joe Perry	Lightning in a Bottle Soundtrack
2005	"Just Feel Better"	Santana featuring Steven Tyler	All That I Am
2006	"Three Chord Country and American Rock & Roll"	Keith Anderson featuring Steven Tyler	Three Chord Country and American Rock & Roll
2009	"Cryin'" and "Smile"	Chris Botti featuring Steven Tyler	Chris Botti in Boston
2011	"Sharp Dressed Man"	The M.O.B. (Steven Tyler, Mick Fleetwood, John McVie, Jonny Lang, Brett Tuggle)	ZZ Top: A Tribute from Friends
2013	"Someday"	Julian Lennon and Steven Tyler	non-album single
2013	"Sex E Bizarre"	Orianthi featuring Steven Tyler	Heaven in This Hell (Deluxe Edition)
2013	"Evil Twin"	Buddy Guy featuring Steven Tyler, Joe Perry and Brad Whitford	Rhythm & Blues
2014	"You Really Got a Hold on Me"	Smokey Robinson featuring Steven Tyler	Smokey & Friends
2014	"Skin City"	Robert Rodriguez featuring Steven Tyler	Sin City: A Dame to Kill For (Soundtrack)
2014	"Vagabond Soul"	The Bayonets featuring Steven Tyler	Crash Boom Bang!
2015	"Crazy"	Hayden Panettiere featuring Steven Tyler	The Music of Nashville: Season 4, Volume 1
2023	"I Want You Back"	Dolly Parton featuring Steven Tyler with special guest Warren Haynes	Rockstar

=== Music videos ===
Year	Video	Director
2011	"Feels So Good"	Trey Fanjoy
2015	"Love Is Your Name"	Trey Fanjoy

== Filmography ==
Year	Film/Broadcast	Role
1978	Sgt. Pepper's Lonely Hearts Club Band	Member of the Future Villain Band
1988	The Decline of Western Civilization Part II: The Metal Years	Himself
1990	Saturday Night Live: Musical guest; "Wayne's World" sketch	Himself
1991	The Simpsons: "Flaming Moe's" episode	Himself (voice)
1993	Wayne's World 2	Himself
1993	Saturday Night Live: Musical guest; "Bad Dancer" sketch	Himself
1997	Saturday Night Live: Musical guest; "Mary Katherine Gallagher" sketch	Himself
1999	Clubland	David Foster
2001	Saturday Night Live: Musical guest	Himself
2002	Lizzie McGuire	Father Christmas/Himself
2004	The Polar Express	Elf Lieutenant / Elf Singer
2004	Goodnight Joseph Parker	Sammy
2005	Be Cool	Himself
2003–2006	Two and a Half Men	Himself; two episodes
2009	Chris Botti In Boston	Himself
2010	The Wonder Pets: Adventures in Wonderland	The Mad Hatter
2011-2012	American Idol	Himself (judge)
2013	Ke$ha: My Crazy Beautiful Life	Himself; Episode: "A Warrior in the Making"
2013	Epic	Nim Galuu (voice)
2013	Miss Universe 2013	Himself
2013	Top Gear	Himself
2014	Hell's Kitchen	Himself; Episode: "11 Chefs Compete, Part 2"
2015	Nashville	Himself
2015	American Idol	Himself
2017	Get the Weed	Himself

== Philanthropy ==
Tyler launched Janie's Fund—named after Aerosmith's 1989 track "Janie's Got a Gun"—in 2015 to providing protection and counseling for young female victims of abuse, and he has helped raise over $2.4 million for the organization since then. Janie's House, established in 2017 in Atlanta, offers shelter for victims of abuse or neglect, with space for 30 live-in clients and 24-hour medical facilities available.

== Awards and nominations ==
- Emmy Award nomination in 2011: – Outstanding Performer in an Animated Program – for playing the Mad Hatter on Wonder Pets: Adventures in Wonderland
