= Box of Fire =

Box set by Aerosmith
- Released: November 22, 1994
- Recorded: 1972–1994
- Genres: Hard rock, blues rock
- Length: 493:57
- Label: Columbia
- Producers: Aerosmith, Adrian Barber, Tony Bongiovi, Ray Colcord, Don DeVito, Jack Douglas, Bob Ezrin, David Krebs, Steve Leber, Gary Lyons, George Marino, Paul O'Neill

Aerosmith compilation chronology
Big Ones (1994)	Box of Fire (1994)	Classic Aerosmith: The Universal Masters Collection (2000)

Professional ratings
Review scores
Source	Rating
AllMusic	4.5/5 stars
Rolling Stone	2/5 stars

Box of Fire is a box set album with all 12 single-disc albums released by Aerosmith under their first contract with Columbia Records. Additionally, the set includes a 20 minute bonus disc of previously unreleased recordings. Box of Fire was released in 1994.

== Track listing ==
=== Aerosmith (Disc 1) ===
No.	Title	Writer(s)	Length
1.	"Make It"	Steven Tyler	3:38
2.	"Somebody"	Tyler, Steven Emspack	3:45
3.	"Dream On"	Tyler	4:27
4.	"One Way Street"	Tyler	7:00
5.	"Mama Kin"	Tyler	4:27
6.	"Write Me a Letter"	Tyler	4:10
7.	"Movin' Out"	Tyler, Joe Perry	5:02
8.	"Walkin' the Dog"	Rufus Thomas	3:12

=== Get Your Wings (Disc 2) ===
No.	Title	Writer(s)	Length
1.	"Same Old Song and Dance"	Tyler, Perry	3:53
2.	"Lord of the Thighs"	Tyler	4:14
3.	"Spaced"	Tyler, Perry	4:22
4.	"Woman of the World"	Tyler, Don Solomon	5:48
5.	"S.O.S. (Too Bad)"	Tyler	2:51
6.	"Train Kept A-Rollin'"	Tiny Bradshaw, Howard Kay, Lois Mann	5:33
7.	"Seasons of Wither"	Tyler	5:39
8.	"Pandora's Box"	Tyler, Joey Kramer	5:44

=== Toys in the Attic (Disc 3) ===
No.	Title	Writer(s)	Length
1.	"Toys in the Attic"	Tyler, Perry	3:05
2.	"Uncle Salty"	Tyler, Tom Hamilton	4:10
3.	"Adam's Apple"	Tyler	4:34
4.	"Walk This Way"	Tyler, Perry	3:40
5.	"Big Ten Inch Record"	Fred Weismantel	2:16
6.	"Sweet Emotion"	Tyler, Hamilton	4:34
7.	"No More No More"	Tyler, Perry	4:34
8.	"Round and Round"	Tyler, Brad Whitford	5:03
9.	"You See Me Crying"	Tyler, Don Solomon	5:12

=== Rocks (Disc 4) ===
No.	Title	Writer(s)	Length
1.	"Back in the Saddle"	Tyler, Perry	4:39
2.	"Last Child"	Tyler, Whitford	3:27
3.	"Rats in the Cellar"	Tyler, Perry	4:06
4.	"Combination"	Perry	3:39
5.	"Sick as a Dog"	Tyler, Hamilton	4:12
6.	"Nobody's Fault"	Tyler, Whitford	4:25
7.	"Get the Lead Out"	Tyler, Perry	3:42
8.	"Lick and a Promise"	Tyler, Perry	3:05
9.	"Home Tonight"	Tyler	3:16

=== Draw the Line (Disc 5) ===
No.	Title	Writer(s)	Length
1.	"Draw the Line"	Tyler, Perry	3:23
2.	"I Wanna Know Why"	Tyler, Perry	3:09
3.	"Critical Mass"	Tyler, Hamilton, Jack Douglas	4:53
4.	"Get It Up"	Tyler, Perry	4:02
5.	"Bright Light Fright"	Perry	2:19
6.	"Kings and Queens"	Tyler, Whitford, Hamilton, Kramer, Douglas	4:55
7.	"The Hand That Feeds"	Tyler, Whitford, Hamilton, Kramer, Douglas	4:23
8.	"Sight for Sore Eyes"	Tyler, Perry, Douglas, David Johansen	3:56
9.	"Milk Cow Blues"	Kokomo Arnold	4:14

=== Live! Bootleg (Disc 6) ===
No.	Title	Writer(s)	Length
1.	"Back in the Saddle" (Indianapolis, IN, 4 July 1977)	Tyler, Perry	4:25
2.	"Sweet Emotion" (Chicago, IL, 24 March 1978)	Tyler, Hamilton	4:42
3.	"Lord of the Thighs" (Chicago, IL, 23 March 1978)	Tyler	7:18
4.	"Toys in the Attic" (Boston, MA, 28 March 1978)	Tyler, Perry	3:45
5.	"Last Child" (The Paradise Club, Boston, MA, 9 August 1978)	Tyler, Whitford	3:14
6.	"Come Together" (The Wherehouse, Waltham, MA, 21 August 1978)	John Lennon, Paul McCartney	4:51
7.	"Walk This Way" (Detroit, MI, 2 April 1978)	Tyler, Perry	3:46
8.	"Sick as a Dog" (Indianapolis, IN, 4 July 1977)	Tyler, Hamilton	4:42
9.	"Dream On" (Louisville, KY, 3 July 1977)	Tyler	4:31
10.	"Chip Away the Stone" (The Santa Monica Civic Auditorium, Santa Monica, CA, 8 April 1978)	Richard Supa	4:12
11.	"Sight for Sore Eyes" (Columbus, OH, 24 March 1978)	Tyler, Perry, Douglas, Johansen	3:18
12.	"Mama Kin" (Indianapolis, IN, 4 July 1977)	Tyler	3:43
13.	"S.O.S. (Too Bad)" (Indianapolis, IN, 4 July 1977)	Tyler	2:46
14.	"I Ain't Got You" (Paul's Mall, Boston, MA, 23 April 1973; WBCN-FM radio simulcast)	Calvin Carter	3:57
15.	"Mother Popcorn/Draw the Line" (Paul's Mall, Boston, MA, 23 April 1973; WBCN-FM radio simulcast / Tower Theater, Upper Darby, Philadelphia, PA, March 26, 1978)	James Brown, Pee Wee Ellis / Tyler, Perry	11:35
16.	"Train Kept A-Rollin'/Strangers in the Night" (Detroit, MI, 2 April 1978)	Tiny Bradshaw, Howard Kay, Lois Mann / Bert Kaempfert, Charlie Singleton, Eddie Snyder	4:51

=== Night in the Ruts (Disc 7) ===
No.	Title	Writer(s)	Length
1.	"No Surprize"	Tyler, Perry	4:25
2.	"Chiquita"	Tyler, Perry	4:24
3.	"Remember (Walking in the Sand)"	Shadow Morton	4:05
4.	"Cheese Cake"	Tyler, Perry	4:15
5.	"Three Mile Smile"	Tyler, Perry	3:42
6.	"Reefer Head Woman"	Joe Bennett, Jazz Gillum, Lester Melrose	4:02
7.	"Bone to Bone (Coney Island White Fish Boy)"	Tyler, Perry	2:59
8.	"Think About It"	Keith Relf, Jimmy Page, Jim McCarty	3:35
9.	"Mia"	Tyler	4:14

=== Greatest Hits (Disc 8) ===
No.	Title	Writer(s)	Length
1.	"Dream On"	Tyler	4:28
2.	"Same Old Song and Dance"	Tyler, Perry	3:01
3.	"Sweet Emotion"	Tyler, Hamilton	3:12
4.	"Walk This Way"	Tyler, Perry	3:31
5.	"Last Child"	Tyler, Whitford	3:27
6.	"Back in the Saddle"	Tyler, Perry	4:38
7.	"Draw the Line"	Tyler, Perry	3:21
8.	"Kings and Queens"	Tyler, Hamilton, Kramer, Whitford, Douglas	3:48
9.	"Come Together"	Lennon, McCartney	3:45
10.	"Remember (Walking in the Sand)"	Morton	4:05

=== Rock in a Hard Place (Disc 9) ===
No.	Title	Writer(s)	Length
1.	"Jailbait"	Tyler, Jimmy Crespo	4:38
2.	"Lightning Strikes"	Supa	4:26
3.	"Bitch's Brew"	Tyler, Crespo	4:14
4.	"Bolivian Ragamuffin"	Tyler, Crespo	3:32
5.	"Cry Me a River"	Arthur Hamilton	4:06
6.	"Prelude to Joanie"	Tyler	1:21
7.	"Joanie's Butterfly"	Tyler, Crespo, Douglas	5:35
8.	"Rock in a Hard Place (Cheshire Cat)"	Tyler, Crespo, Douglas	4:46
9.	"Jig Is Up"	Tyler, Crespo	3:10
10.	"Push Comes to Shove"	Tyler	4:28

=== Classics Live! (Disc 10) ===
No.	Title	Writer(s)	Length
1.	"Train Kept A-Rollin'"	Bradshaw, Mann, Kay	3:20
2.	"Kings and Queens"	Tyler, Whitford, Hamilton, Kramer, Douglas	4:46
3.	"Sweet Emotion"	Tyler, Hamilton	5:14
4.	"Dream On"	Tyler	4:50
5.	"Mama Kin"	Tyler	3:41
6.	"Three Mile Smile / Reefer Head Woman"	Tyler, Perry / Melrose, Bennett, Gillum	4:54
7.	"Lord of the Thighs"	Tyler	7:05
8.	"Major Barbara"	Tyler	4:03

=== Classics Live! II (Disc 11) ===
No.	Title	Writer(s)	Length
1.	"Back in the Saddle"	Tyler, Perry	4:38
2.	"Walk This Way"	Tyler, Perry	4:22
3.	"Movin' Out"	Tyler, Perry	5:44
4.	"Draw The Line"	Tyler, Perry	4:47
5.	"Same Old Song and Dance"	Tyler, Perry	5:45
6.	"Last Child"	Tyler, Whitford	3:43
7.	"Let the Music Do the Talking"	Perry	5:44
8.	"Toys in the Attic"	Tyler, Perry	4:04

=== Gems (Disc 12) ===
No.	Title	Writer(s)	Length
1.	"Rats in the Cellar"	Tyler, Perry	4:06
2.	"Lick and a Promise"	Tyler, Perry	3:05
3.	"Chip Away the Stone"	Supa	4:01
4.	"No Surprize"	Tyler, Perry	4:26
5.	"Mama Kin"	Tyler	4:27
6.	"Adam's Apple"	Tyler	4:34
7.	"Nobody's Fault"	Tyler, Whitford	4:18
8.	"Round and Round"	Tyler, Whitford	5:03
9.	"Critical Mass"	Tyler, Hamilton, Douglas	4:52
10.	"Lord of the Thighs"	Tyler	4:14
11.	"Jailbait"	Tyler, Crespo	4:39
12.	"Train Kept A-Rollin'"	Bradshaw, Kay, Mann	5:41

=== Box of Fire Bonus Disc (Disc 13) ===
No.	Title	Writer(s)	Length
1.	"Sweet Emotion" (1991)	Tyler, Hamilton	4:33
2.	"Rockin' Pneumonia and the Boogie Woogie Flu"	Huey "Piano" Smith	2:54
3.	"Subway"	Whitford, Hamilton, Kramer	3:29
4.	"Circle Jerk"	Whitford	3:40
5.	"Dream On" (MTV Anniversary)	Tyler	5:44

== Certification ==
Region	Certification	Certified units/sales
United States (RIAA)	Gold	500,000^{^}
^{^} Shipments figures based on certification alone.

== Release history ==
Region	Date	Format	Tracks	Label	Catalog #	Barcode	Edition	Series	Notes
USA	Nov 22, 1994	CD x 13	121	Columbia/SMEI	CXK 66687	074646668726	—	—	1993 Remasters (except Box of Fire Bonus Disc); sched. for Nov 8, 1994 - delayed 2 weeks
