= Let Rock Rule Tour =

2014 concert tour by Aerosmith

- Tour by Aerosmith
- Location: North America
- Start date: July 10, 2014
- End date: September 12, 2014
- Legs: 1
- No. of shows: 21

Aerosmith concert chronology
- Global Warming Tour (2012–14); Let Rock Rule Tour (2014); Blue Army Tour (2015)

The Let Rock Rule Tour was a concert tour by American hard rock band Aerosmith that featured Slash (with Myles Kennedy and the Conspirators) as the opening act. The tour sent both acts to various locations across North America from July to September 2014 and included two festival concerts and eighteen regular concerts. In addition, Aerosmith performed a private show in the middle of the tour. Slash with Myles Kennedy & the Conspirators did not perform at Rock Fest in Wisconsin or at the private show, but performed at all of the other concerts.

Full details of the concert tour were announced on April 8, 2014 in an interview with Steven Tyler and Joe Perry on On Air with Ryan Seacrest and through the launch of a new version of the band's website. To promote the tour, the band played a brief concert with Slash at the Whisky a Go Go on the Sunset Strip in West Hollywood, California. Tyler and Perry also appeared on The Ellen DeGeneres Show where they gave away tickets to the studio audience.

The concert tour followed Aerosmith's Global Warming Tour which saw the band play 88 concerts on five continents from 2012 to 2014 in support of their 2012 album Music from Another Dimension!.

== Tour dates ==
Date	City	Country	Venue
North America
July 10, 2014	Wantagh	United States	Nikon at Jones Beach Theater
July 13, 2014	Kitchener	Canada	Big Music Fest
July 16, 2014	Mansfield	United States	Xfinity Center
July 19, 2014	Cadott	United States	Rock Fest
July 22, 2014	Cincinnati	United States	Riverbend Music Center
July 25, 2014	Tinley Park	United States	First Midwest Bank Amphitheatre
July 30, 2014	Inglewood	United States	The Forum
August 2, 2014	Las Vegas	United States	MGM Grand Garden Arena
August 5, 2014	Dana Point	United States	St. Regis Monarch Beach Resort (private Allstate event)
August 8, 2014	Stateline	United States	Harveys Outdoor Arena
~~August 13, 2014~~	~~Concord~~	United States	~~Concord Pavilion~~
August 16, 2014	George	United States	The Gorge
August 19, 2014	Denver	United States	Pepsi Center
August 22, 2014	Dallas	United States	American Airlines Center
August 25, 2014	The Woodlands	United States	Cynthia Woods Mitchell Pavilion
August 28, 2014	Atlanta	United States	Philips Arena
August 31, 2014	Atlantic City	United States	Boardwalk Hall
September 3, 2014	Newark	United States	Prudential Center
September 6, 2014	Bristow	United States	Jiffy Lube Live
September 9, 2014	Clarkston	United States	DTE Energy Music Theatre
September 12, 2014	Sydney	Canada	Open Hearth Park

== Setlist ==
An average setlist would look like this:

1. "Back in the Saddle" (not performed at shows in Dana Point, Stateline, George, Denver, or Dallas; replaced with "Train Kept A-Rollin'" at shows in Atlanta, Atlantic City, Newark, Bristow, and Clarkston)
2. "Eat the Rich" (moved after "Love in an Elevator" at shows after Stateline; moved back to this slot for shows in Atlantic City, Newark, Bristow, and Clarkston; not performed at show in Dana Point)
3. "Love in an Elevator"
4. "Cryin'"
5. "S.O.S. (Too Bad)" (only performed at shows in George and Denver; “Pink” performed in this slot at the show in Dana Point)
6. "Livin' on the Edge"
7. "Monkey on My Back" (not performed at shows after Las Vegas)
8. "Kings and Queens" (not performed at show in Dana Point)
9. "Toys in the Attic"
10. "Pink" (only performed at the show in The Woodlands) or "Jaded" (only performed at the shows in Atlanta, Atlantic City, Newark, Bristow, and Clarkston)
11. "Rag Doll"
12. "Freedom Fighter" (replaced with "Stop Messin' Around" at shows after Inglewood)
13. "Big Ten Inch Record" or "Same Old Song and Dance" (neither were performed at shows in Newark, Bristow, or Clarkston; both “Jaded” and “Same Old Song and Dance” performed back-to-back in this slot at show in Dana Point)
14. "Rats in the Cellar" (replaced with "Lord of the Thighs" at shows after Tinley Park; replaced with “Janie's Got a Gun” at show in Dana Point; replaced with "Mama Kin" at shows after Denver; "Mama Kin" replaced with "Movin' Out" and "Walkin' the Dog" at show in Atlantic City; "Mama Kin" was performed with Slash at the shows in Newark and Clarkston)
15. "I Don't Want to Miss a Thing"
16. "No More No More" (not performed at show in Dana Point)
17. "Dude (Looks Like a Lady)" (replaced with "Come Together" at shows in Atlantic City, Newark, Bristow, and Clarkston)
18. "Walk This Way"

Encore

1. "Dream On" (Encore)
2. "Sweet Emotion" (Encore)
- At the show in Wantagh, "Monkey on My Back" was not performed, while "Chip Away the Stone" was performed after "No More No More" and before "Dude (Looks Like a Lady)"
- At the show in Mansfield, both "Freedom Fighter" and "Stop Messin' Around" were performed back-to-back, followed by "Mama Kin" (with Slash). "Train Kept A-Rollin'" (with Johnny Depp) was added as a final encore after "Sweet Emotion"
- At the show in Stateline, "Pink", "Jaded", and "Janie's Got a Gun" were added, while "Eat the Rich", "Monkey on My Back" and "No More No More" were dropped
- Before "Dream On", Steven Tyler performs a snippet of "Home Tonight" or "Darkness" (at the show in Newark, a snippet of "Mia" was also performed, in addition to a snippet of "Home Tonight")

== Notes ==
- Slash joined Aerosmith on stage for "Mama Kin" at the shows in Mansfield, Newark, and Clarkston
- Also at the Mansfield show, actor Johnny Depp joined the band on stage for a performance of "Train Kept A-Rollin'"
- Aerosmith played a private show in Dana Point, California on August 5 for Allstate
- The concert in Concord on August 13 was canceled due to problems with Joey Kramer's health
- Joey Kramer's son Jesse filled in for his father on the August 16th date in George, Washington and the August 19th date in Denver, Colorado, with Joey returning to play for the encore songs on August 19
- After being challenged by Mötley Crüe, Aerosmith participated in the Ice Bucket Challenge at the end of their performance in The Woodlands
- The entire show in Clarkston was broadcast live on Yahoo!
- At the show in Clarkston, Slash presented a cake and Steven Tyler led the audience in singing "Happy Birthday" in honor of Joe Perry's 64th birthday the following day

== Personnel ==
Aerosmith

- Steven Tyler – lead vocals, harmonica, percussion
- Joe Perry – guitar, backing vocals, lap pedal steel, talkbox
- Brad Whitford – guitar
- Tom Hamilton – bass, additional backing vocals on Love in an Elevator and Dude Looks Like A Lady
- Joey Kramer – drums, percussion

Additional musicians

- Buck Johnson – keyboards, backing vocals
- Jesse Sky Kramer – drums, percussion (on August 16 and 19)
