= Back in the Saddle Tour =

1984–85 concert tour by Aerosmith

- Tour by Aerosmith
- Poster to the concert in Saint Paul, Minnesota
- Start date: June 22, 1984
- End date: January 18, 1985
- Legs: 2
- No. of shows: 65

Aerosmith concert chronology
- Rock in a Hard Place Tour (1982–1983); Back in the Saddle Tour (1984–1985); Done with Mirrors Tour (1985–1986)

The Back in the Saddle Tour was a comeback concert tour by American rock group Aerosmith, which had been relatively inactive for several years. The tour began on June 22, 1984, in Concord, New Hampshire and ended on January 18, 1985, in Columbus, Ohio.

== Background ==
Formed in 1970, Aerosmith was on hard times by the early 1980s. Vocalist Steven Tyler had been drinking heavily, and his voice had suffered. Lead guitarist Joe Perry was addicted to heroin. The relationship between the two most prominent members of the band had deteriorated to "hostility". Discussing his relationship with Perry, Tyler said "I hated his guts. I said 'I never want to fucking play on the same stage with you again'."

Joe Perry quit the band in 1979 and embarked on solo career with The Joe Perry Project. Guitarist Brad Whitford also quit to work with Derek St. Holmes and later joined Perry's band. Most of Aerosmith's ventures without Perry and Whitford were unsuccessful. Many fans believed that this was the end of Aerosmith.

== Reunion ==
In 1983, the original band members "started drifting back together". Perry had kicked his heroin habit, and although Tyler was still drinking, he was in somewhat better control of himself. Tyler had concluded that "Time heals all wounds. Joe is nothing without me, and I'm nothing without him." They faced problems, however, as the "group had no current album or record deal." To jump start their career, the band decided on a tour of the United States, considering as many as 70 performances. In its final form, the tour consisted of 58 performances.

== Tour ==
Doubts were expressed as to whether Aerosmith could make a comeback. "Cynics may suggest that the reunion dubbed the Back in the Saddle Tour is all the band has going for it. Aerosmith hasn't had a new album in two years."

The tour consisted of two legs with a three-month break at the midpoint. The tour "got a roar of approval from loyal fans", and it was described as "a rousing success". The band's tour income was "estimated as high as $3 million".

== Setlist ==
1. "Rats In The Cellar"
2. "Back In The Saddle"
3. "Bone To Bone (Coney Island White Fish Boy)"
4. "Big Ten Inch Record"
5. "Movin' Out"
6. "Last Child"
7. "Let The Music Do The Talking" (On 12/31, Aerosmith performed the Joe Perry Project version)
8. "Red House" "(The Jimi Hendrix Experience Cover)"
9. "Dream On"
10. "Sweet Emotion"
11. "Same Old Song And Dance"

Encore:

1. "Walk This Way"
2. "Train Kept A-Rollin'"

== Record contract ==
The success of the tour "piqued the interest" of Geffen Records and "resulted in a new deal with Geffen."

== Legacy ==
The tour was "deemed a success". It did "what it was meant to do. Fans welcomed them back with open arms." The tour "proved to be exactly what Aerosmith needed, launching the reunion on just the right note of organized mayhem."

Six of the eight tracks on the album Classics Live II were recorded at the Orpheum Theater in the band's home town of Boston on New Year's Eve, December 31, 1984 in the final weeks of the Back In The Saddle Tour. This album has been called "far more worthy than its nondescript packaging suggested".

== Tour dates ==
List of 1984 concerts
Date	City	Country	Venue
June 22, 1984	Concord	United States	Capitol Theater
June 23, 1984	Concord	United States	Capitol Theater
June 27, 1984	Weedsport	United States	Cayuga County Fair Speedway
June 28, 1984	Saratoga Springs	United States	Saratoga Performing Arts Center
June 30, 1984	Rochester	United States	Rochester Community War Memorial
July 2, 1984	Columbia	United States	Merriweather Post Pavilion
July 3, 1984	Harrisburg	United States	City Island
July 5, 1984	Middletown	United States	Orange County Fair Speedway
July 6, 1984	Norfolk	United States	Norfolk Scope
July 8, 1984	Erie	United States	Erie Civic Center
July 9, 1984	Vaughan	Canada	Kingswood Music Theatre
July 11, 1984	Clarkston	United States	Pine Knob Music Theater
July 12, 1984	Hoffman Estates	United States	Poplar Creek Music Theater
July 13, 1984	Springfield	United States	Prairie Capital Convention Center
July 14, 1984	Charlevoix	United States	Castle Farms
July 15, 1984	Rockford	United States	Rockford MetroCentre
July 17, 1984	Richfield	United States	Richfield Coliseum
July 18, 1984	Dayton	United States	Hara Arena
July 20, 1984	Saginaw	United States	Wendler Arena
July 21, 1984	St. Paul	United States	Navy Island
July 23, 1984	Toledo	United States	Toledo Sports Arena
July 24, 1984	Dubuque	United States	Five Flags Center
July 27, 1984	St. Paul	United States	Navy Island
July 29, 1984	St. Louis	United States	St. Louis Arena
July 30, 1984	Kansas City	United States	Starlight Theater
August 1, 1984	Chattanooga	United States	UTC Arena
August 2, 1984	Roanoke	United States	Roanoke Civic Center
August 4, 1984	Worcester	United States	The Centrum
August 5, 1984	Worcester	United States	The Centrum
August 8, 1984	Philadelphia	United States	The Spectrum
August 10, 1984	Portland	United States	Cumberland County Civic Center
August 11, 1984	Montreal	Canada	Montreal Forum
August 13, 1984	Halifax	Canada	Halifax Metro Center
August 14, 1984	Bangor, Maine	United States	Bangor Auditorium
August 20, 1984	Phoenix, Arizona	United States	Arizona Veterans Memorial Coliseum
August 22, 1984	San Diego	United States	Golden Hall
August 25, 1984	Los Angeles	United States	Greek Theatre
August 26, 1984	Los Angeles	United States	Greek Theatre
August 28, 1984	San Bernardino	United States	Orange Pavilion
August 29, 1984	Bakersfield	United States	Bakersfield Civic Auditorium
August 31, 1984	Oakland	United States	Oakland–Alameda County Coliseum Arena
December 7, 1984	Albuquerque	United States	Tingley Coliseum
December 8, 1984	El Paso	United States	El Paso County Coliseum
December 10, 1984	Corpus Christi	United States	Memorial Coliseum
December 11, 1984	San Antonio	United States	HemisFair Arena
December 13, 1984	Dallas	United States	Reunion Arena
December 14, 1984	Houston	United States	The Summit
December 18, 1984	Ft. Lauderdale	United States	Sunrise Musical Theater
December 20, 1984	Orlando	United States	Orange County Convention Center
December 21, 1984	St. Petersburg	United States	Bayfront Center
December 23, 1984	Orlando	United States	Orange County Convention Center
December 26, 1984	Glen Falls	United States	Glens Falls Civic Center
December 27, 1984	Providence	United States	Providence Civic Center
December 29, 1984	New Haven	United States	New Haven Coliseum
December 30, 1984	Boston	United States	Orpheum Theater
December 31, 1984	Boston	United States	Orpheum Theater

List of 1985 concerts
Date	City	Country	Venue
January 2, 1985	Binghamton	United States	Broome County Veterans Memorial Arena
January 3, 1985	Hershey	United States	Hersheypark Arena
January 4, 1985	Bethlehem	United States	Stabler Arena
January 6, 1985	Springfield	United States	Springfield Civic Center
January 7, 1985	Baltimore	United States	Baltimore Civic Center
January 11, 1985	Merrillville	United States	Star Plaza Theatre
January 12, 1985	Detroit	United States	Joe Louis Arena
January 13, 1985	Muskegon	United States	L. C. Walker Arena
January 14, 1985	Muskegon	United States	L. C. Walker Arena
January 15, 1985	Lexington	United States	Rupp Arena
January 17, 1985	Carbondale	United States	SIU Arena
January 18, 1985	Columbus	United States	Battelle Hall
