= Aerosmith World Tour 2007 =

2007 concert tour by Aerosmith

World Tour 2007
- Tour by Aerosmith
- Start date: April 12, 2007
- End date: September 24, 2007
- Legs: 4
- No. of shows: 38 (scheduled); 36 (played)

Aerosmith concert chronology
- Route of All Evil Tour (2006); World Tour 2007 (2007); Aerosmith/ZZ Top Tour (2009)

Aerosmith World Tour 2007 (or The Tour Heard 'Round the World) was a concert tour by American hard rock band Aerosmith that saw the band performing outside North America or Japan for the first time in about eight years (since the Nine Lives Tour), and in some countries, the first time in 14 years (since the Get a Grip Tour). As part of the tour, the band also visited some countries for the first time ever, including India, the United Arab Emirates, Latvia, and Estonia.

The concert tour began in the spring of 2007 in South America, where the band performed to sold-out stadium crowds. In the Summer of 2007, the band performed throughout Eurasia, including performances at several major rock festivals. The band also played a select few concerts in Canada and California at the end of July. In September 2007, the band performed eight dates in Northeastern North America, and concluded the tour with a private show in Hawaii.

Even though the tour was a brief 36 performances, the band performed in a total of 19 countries. The tour was a large success, as Aerosmith was ranked #14 for the highest-grossing touring acts of 2007.

== Set list ==
1. "Love in an Elevator"
2. "Same Old Song and Dance"
3. "Cryin'"
4. "Eat the Rich"
5. "Jaded"
6. "I Don't Want to Miss a Thing"
7. "What It Takes"
8. "Baby, Please Don't Go"
9. "Hangman Jury"
10. "Seasons of Wither"
11. "S.O.S. (Too Bad)"
12. "Dream On"
13. "Livin' on the Edge"
14. "Stop Messin' Around"
15. "Sweet Emotion"
16. "Draw the Line"
17. "Walk This Way"

== Tour dates ==
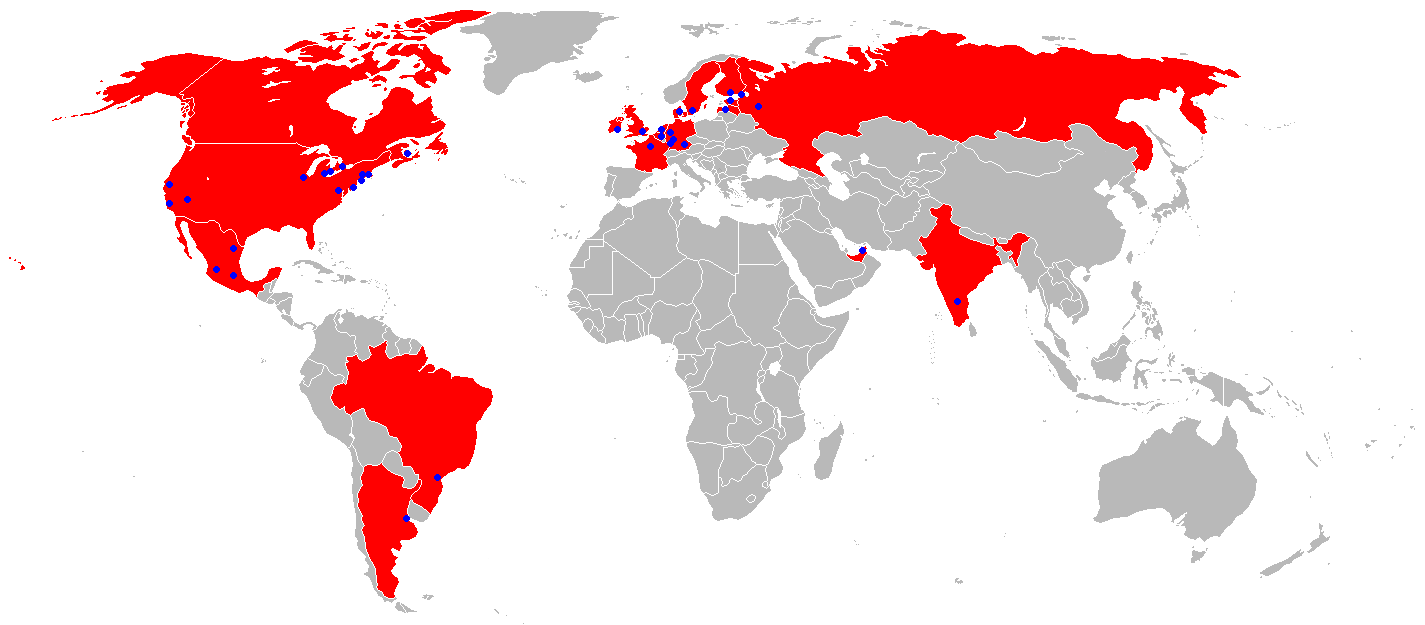
Map of locations Aerosmith played on this tour.

Date	City	Country	Venue
South America
April 12, 2007	São Paulo	Brazil	Estádio do Morumbi
April 15, 2007	Buenos Aires	Argentina	Quilmes Rock, River Plate Stadium
North America
April 18, 2007	San Nicolás de los Garza	Mexico	Estadio Universitario
April 20, 2007	Guadalajara	Mexico	Arena VFG
April 22, 2007	Mexico City	Mexico	Foro Sol
April 28, 2007	Las Vegas	United States	Mandalay Bay
May 2, 2007	New York City	United States	Javits Center
Asia
May 31, 2007	Dubai	United Arab Emirates	Dubai Autodrome
June 2, 2007	Bangalore	India	Bangalore Palace
Europe
June 6, 2007	Randers	Denmark	Essex Park
June 8, 2007	Sölvesborg	Sweden	Sweden Rock Festival
June 10, 2007	Frankfurt	Germany	Messe Frankfurt, Hessentag
June 12, 2007	Karlsruhe	Germany	Dm-Arena
June 14, 2007	Munich	Germany	Olympiahalle
June 16, 2007	Venice	Italy	~~Heineken Music Festival~~ CANCELED
June 19, 2007	Paris	France	Palais Omnisports de Paris-Bercy
June 22, 2007	Dessel	Belgium	Graspop Metal Meeting
June 24, 2007	London	England	Hyde Park
June 26, 2007	Rathfarnham	Ireland	Marlay Park
June 28, 2007	Cologne	Germany	Kölnarena
June 30, 2007	Biddinghuizen	Netherlands	Arrow Rock Festival
July 3, 2007	Riga	Latvia	Skonto Stadions
July 5, 2007	Tallinn	Estonia	A. Le Coq Arena
July 7, 2007	Helsinki	Finland	Hartwall Areena
July 10, 2007	Saint Petersburg	Russia	SCC Arena
July 12, 2007	Moscow	Russia	Olympiysky Arena
North America
July 19, 2007	Sarnia	Canada	Sarnia Bayfest
July 21, 2007	Charlottetown	Canada	Blast at the Beach; Opening acts included Cheap Trick and 54-40
July 25, 2007	Paso Robles	United States	Mid-State Fair
July 27, 2007	Kelseyville	United States	Konocti Harbor Resort
Opening act: Joan Jett
September 8, 2007	Clarkston	United States	DTE Energy Music Theater
September 10, 2007	Rosemont	United States	~~Allstate Arena~~ POSTPONED
September 12, 2007	Wantagh	United States	Jones Beach Theater
September 14, 2007	Mansfield	United States	Tweeter Center
September 16, 2007	Bristow	United States	Nissan Pavilion
September 18, 2007	Toronto	Canada	Molson Amphitheatre
September 20, 2007	Uncasville	United States	Mohegan Sun Arena
September 22, 2007	Atlantic City	United States	Borgata Events Center
September 24, 2007	Rosemont	United States	Allstate Arena - RESCHEDULED DATE
September 26, 2007	Wailuku	United States	~~War Memorial Stadium~~ CANCELED (Rescheduled for 10/20/09 as part of legal settlement)
