= Rockin' the Joint =

Live album by Aerosmith
- Released: October 25, 2005
- Recorded: January 11, 2002
- Venue: The Joint (Las Vegas)
- Genres: Hard rock, blues rock
- Length: 58:28
- Label: Columbia
- Producers: Marti Frederiksen and Steven Tyler

Aerosmith live chronology
A Little South of Sanity (1998)	Rockin' the Joint (2005)	Aerosmith Rocks Donington 2014 (2015)

Professional ratings
Review scores
Source	Rating
AllMusic	2.5/5 stars
PopMatters	(2/10)

Rockin' the Joint is a live album by Aerosmith, which was released on October 25, 2005. It was recorded in January 2002 in The Joint at the Hard Rock Hotel in Las Vegas on their Just Push Play Tour, and consists of Aerosmith songs from throughout their career performed live.

This is the first Aerosmith album to be available in a DualDisc format, having one side of the disc being the CD side with the standard edition of the album, and a DVD side which featuring the album in enhanced stereo, behind the scenes footage, and 4 live tracks in video format. Multiple editions of this album contain bonus tracks, most notably the Japanese and Target Exclusive editions. Strangely, the bonus tracks are not included on the CD side of the Target dual disc release, only on the DVD side. While the non-DualDisc Target edition contains the bonus tracks in CD format.

The Japanese release was presented on two separate discs a CD and a DVD, as opposed to a DualDisc.

== CD ==
No.	Title	Writer(s)	Length
1.	"Good Evening Las Vegas"		0:22
2.	"Beyond Beautiful"	Steven Tyler, Joe Perry, Marti Frederiksen, Mark Hudson	4:51
3.	"Same Old Song and Dance"	Tyler, Perry	5:50
4.	"No More No More"	Tyler, Perry	4:40
5.	"Seasons of Wither"	Tyler	5:05
6.	"Light Inside"	Tyler, Perry, Frederiksen	3:35
7.	"Draw the Line"	Tyler, Perry	7:22
8.	"I Don't Want to Miss a Thing"	Diane Warren	4:33
9.	"Big Ten Inch Record"	Fred Weismantel	4:17
10.	"Rattlesnake Shake"	Peter Green	8:24
11.	"Walk This Way"	Tyler, Perry	4:12
12.	"Train Kept a Rollin'/The Star Spangled Banner*"	Tiny Bradshaw, Howard Kay, Lois Mann	5:13

Japanese bonus tracks
No.	Title	Writer(s)	Length
13.	"Toys in the Attic"	Tyler, Perry	4:00
14.	"Livin' on the Edge"	Tyler, Perry, Hudson	5:30

Target exclusive bonus tracks
No.	Title	Writer(s)	Length
13.	"Livin' on the Edge"	Tyler, Perry, Hudson	5:30
14.	"What It Takes"	Tyler, Perry, Child	5:23

- "The Star Spangled Banner" appeared as a hidden track at the end of "Train Kept A Rollin'"

== DVD and DualDisc DVD Side ==
No.	Title	Length
1.	"No More No More"	4:40
2.	"Dream On"	4:57
3.	"Draw the Line"	7:22
4.	"Sweet Emotion"	6:03

Japanese bonus tracks
No.	Title	Length
5.	"Toys in the Attic"	4:00
6.	"Livin' on the Edge"	5:30

Target bonus tracks (not included on CD side)
No.	Title	Writer(s)	Length
5.	"Livin' on the Edge"	Tyler, Perry, Hudson	5:30
6.	"What It Takes"	Tyler, Perry, Child	5:23

== Personnel ==
Aerosmith

- Steven Tyler – lead vocals, harmonica, mixing, producer
- Joe Perry – guitar, backing vocals
- Brad Whitford – guitar
- Tom Hamilton – bass
- Joey Kramer – drums, percussion

Additional musicians

- Russ Irwin – keyboards, backing vocals

Production

- Marti Frederiksen – producer, mixing
- Guy Charbonneau – engineer
- Sean Evans – art direction
- Ian Gittler – photography

== Charts ==
=== Album ===
Chart (2005)	Peak position
Japanese Albums (Oricon)	16
Swiss Albums (Schweizer Hitparade)	97
US Billboard 200	24

== Release history ==
Region	Date	Format	Tracks	Label	Catalog #	Barcode	Edition	Series	Notes
USA	Oct 25, 2005	CD	14	Columbia/SBME	CK 96522	827969652220	—	Target Exclusive	
USA	Oct 25, 2005	DualDisc	30	Columbia/SBME	CN 97737	827969773727	—	—	
USA	Oct 25, 2005	DualDisc	32	Columbia/SBME	CN 97738	827969773826	—	Target Exclusive	
USA	Oct 25, 2005	CD	12	Columbia/SBME	CK 97800	827969780022	—	—	
USA	Nov 25, 2008	CD	12	Columbia/SBME	CK 97800	886973609422	—	—	
