= Back in the Saddle (disambiguation) =

"Back in the Saddle" is a song by American hard rock band Aerosmith.

Back in the Saddle may also refer to:

- Back in the Saddle (album), by Chris Cagle
- Back in the Saddle (film), a 1941 American Western
- "Back in the Saddle" (Highway Thru Hell), a 2014 television episode
- "Back in the Saddle" (The Simple Life), a 2004 television episode
- Back in the Saddle Tour, a concert tour by Aerosmith

== See also ==
- Back in the Saddle Again
