= Classics Live I and II =

1986 and 1987 live albums by Aerosmith

Classics Live and Classics Live II are albums by American rock band Aerosmith, released in 1986 and 1987, respectively. Together, they constitute the band's second live offering, after Live! Bootleg. Classics Live I has gone platinum while Classics Live II has gone gold.

== Classics Live ==
Classics Live

Live album by Aerosmith
- Released: April 1986; September 8, 1986 (UK)
- Recorded: 1977–1983
- Studios: Record Plant, New York City
- Genres: Hard rock, blues rock
- Length: 36:03
- Label: Columbia
- Producers: Paul O'Neill, Tony Bongiovi ("Major Barbra")

Aerosmith live chronology
Live! Bootleg (1978)	Classics Live (1986)	A Little South of Sanity (1998)

Professional ratings
Review scores
Source	Rating
AllMusic	2/5 stars
Collector's Guide to Heavy Metal	8/10
The Encyclopedia of Popular Music	2/5 stars
Rolling Stone	2/5 stars

Classics Live! is drawn from concerts in 1978 and 1984. Some of the recordings feature guitarists Jimmy Crespo and Rick Dufay, who had replaced Joe Perry and Brad Whitford respectively. Different versions of most of its songs had been released on Live! Bootleg in 1978. Venues and dates (and therefore which guitarists played on each track) were not originally listed on the sleeve, which simply stated that "These songs were recorded at various concerts between 1977 and 1983."

The studio track "Major Barbra" was recorded for, but left off, the album Get Your Wings. An alternate version appears on the compilation Pandora's Box.

=== Track listing ===
All songs recorded at the Orpheum Theatre, Boston, Massachusetts, February 14, 1984, except where noted.

All tracks are written by Steven Tyler, except where noted.

No.	Title	Writer(s)	Length
1.	"Train Kept A-Rollin'"	Tiny Bradshaw, Lois Mann, Howard Kay	3:22
2.	"Kings and Queens" (Boston Music Hall in Boston, MA March 28, 1978 and re-recorded. Original recording appears on the compilation Pandora's Box)	Steven Tyler, Brad Whitford, Tom Hamilton, Joey Kramer, Jack Douglas	4:46
3.	"Sweet Emotion" (Huntington Civic Center, Huntington, WV, Dec. 12, 1982)	Tyler, Hamilton	5:13
4.	"Dream On" (Capital Center, Largo, MD, Nov. 9, 1978)		4:50
5.	"Mama Kin"		3:41
6.	"Three Mile Smile / Reefer Head Woman"	Tyler, Joe Perry / Lester Melrose, J. Bennett, Jazz Gillum	4:54
7.	"Lord of the Thighs"		7:05
8.	"Major Barbra" (Studio Outtake)		4:02

Classics Live II

Live album by Aerosmith
- Released: June 1987
- Recorded: 1978–1986
- Genres: Hard rock, blues rock
- Length: 38:47
- Label: Columbia
- Producers: Paul O'Neill, Aerosmith

Aerosmith live chronology
Classics Live (1986)	Classics Live II (1987)	A Little South of Sanity (1998)

Professional ratings
Review scores
Source	Rating
AllMusic	3/5 stars
Christgau's Record Guide	B+
Collector's Guide to Heavy Metal	5/10
The Encyclopedia of Popular Music	3/5 stars
Rolling Stone	2/5 stars

=== Personnel ===
- Paul O'Neill – producer
- Tony Bongiovi – producer on "Major Barbra"
- James Ball, Crey Russell, Thom Panunzio – engineers
- Carol Cafiero, Paul Special, Teddy Treewella – assistant engineers
- Jack Skinner – mastering
- David Krebs, Steve Leber – executive producers

=== Charts ===
Chart (1986)	Peak position
US Billboard 200	84

=== Certification ===
Region	Certification	Certified units/sales
United States (RIAA)	Platinum	1,000,000^{^}
^{^} Shipments figures based on certification alone.

== Classics Live II ==
Classics Live! II mainly features tracks recorded at a New Year's Eve show in 1984, with all five original members reunited. Also featured are the opening track of 1985's Done with Mirrors, "Let the Music Do the Talking", and a rendition of 1977's "Draw the Line" from California Jam II. Band photography is by Paul McAlpine.

=== Track listing ===
All recorded at the Orpheum Theatre, Boston, Massachusetts, December 31, 1984, except where noted.

All tracks are written by Steven Tyler and Joe Perry, except where noted.

No.	Title	Writer(s)	Length
1.	"Back in the Saddle"		4:40
2.	"Walk This Way"		4:21
3.	"Movin' Out"		5:44
4.	"Draw the Line" (California Jam Festival, Ontario Speedway, Ontario, CA, March 18, 1978)		4:46
5.	"Same Old Song and Dance"		5:45
6.	"Last Child"	Tyler, Whitford	3:42
7.	"Let the Music Do the Talking" (Worcester Centrum, Worcester, MA, March 12, 1986)	Perry	5:44
8.	"Toys in the Attic"		4:03

=== Certification ===
Region	Certification	Certified units/sales
United States (RIAA)	Gold	500,000^{^}
^{^} Shipments figures based on certification alone.

== Classics Live Complete ==
In 1998, Classics Live! Complete was released outside the U.S., compiling the two albums on one CD.

Classics Live: Complete

Live album by Aerosmith
- Released: August 1998
- Recorded: 1977–1986
- Genres: Hard rock, blues rock
- Length: 76:50
- Label: Columbia
- Producers: Paul O'Neill, Tony Bongiovi ("Major Barbra"), Aerosmith

Professional ratings
Review scores
Source	Rating
AllMusic	3/5 stars
The Encyclopedia of Popular Music	3/5 stars

== Bibliography ==
- Huxley, Martin (2015). Aerosmith: The Fall and the Rise of Rock's Greatest Band. St. Martin's Publishing Group. ISBN 978-1250096531.
