= Pandora's Box (Aerosmith song) =

Song by Aerosmith

from the album Get Your Wings
- Released: March 15, 1974
- Studio: Record Plant (New York City)
- Genre: Hard rock; blues rock
- Length: 5:44
- Label: Columbia
- Songwriters: Steven Tyler; Joey Kramer
- Producer: Jack Douglas

"Pandora's Box" is a song by American rock band, Aerosmith on their second album, Get Your Wings. The song was written by lead-singer, Steven Tyler, and drummer, Joey Kramer, the first writing credit for Kramer. The song was featured on Guitar Hero: Aerosmith as a bonus track. "Pandora's Box" was written when Kramer found an acoustic guitar in a dumpster outside their apartment, the same guitar Tyler used to write the ballad "Seasons of Wither" with. The track was the B-side to "Same Old Song and Dance".

== In performance ==
"Pandora's Box" was only played live throughout the early to mid-seventies and has never been played again so far . The first time it was played live was on September 14, 1973 at The Box Club in Boston.
