= Get Your Wings =

1974 studio album by Aerosmith

Studio album by Aerosmith
- Released: March 15, 1974
- Recorded: December 17, 1973 – January 14, 1974
- Studios: Record Plant, New York City
- Genres: Hard rock; blues rock
- Length: 38:04
- Label: Columbia
- Producers: Jack Douglas; Ray Colcord; Bob Ezrin (executive)

Aerosmith chronology
Aerosmith (1973)	Get Your Wings (1974)	Toys in the Attic (1975)

Singles from Get Your Wings
- 1. "Same Old Song and Dance" Released: March 1974; 2. "Train Kept A Rollin' (single edit)" Released: October 1974; 3. "S.O.S. (Too Bad)" Released: February 1975

Get Your Wings is the second studio album by American rock band Aerosmith, released on March 15, 1974. The album was their first to be produced by Jack Douglas, who also was responsible for the band's next three albums. Three singles were released from the album, but none reached the singles charts.

The album has been released in stereo and quadraphonic, and certified triple platinum by the RIAA.

== Background ==
In January 1973, Aerosmith released its debut album to little fanfare. As guitarist Joe Perry recalled in the 1997 band memoir Walk This Way, "There was no nothing at all: no press, no radio, no airplay, no reviews, no interviews, no party. Instead the album got ignored and there was a lot of anger and flipping out." In response to the album's lack of success, the group toured extensively and built their fanbase, taking a break in December 1973 to record their follow up album. The group recorded the album at New York's Record Plant, with Jack Douglas serving as the producer. Douglas would go on to record several albums with the group.

== Writing ==
Like their first album, the group began the sessions with several of the songs already written. Their cover of "Train Kept A-Rollin" had long been part of their concert repertoire, and the group had been playing new songs "S.O.S. (Too Bad)" and "Pandora's Box" in concert since September 1973. "Seasons of Wither" and "Woman of the World" also predated the sessions, while "Spaced" and "Lord of the Thighs" were written during the sessions. In 1997, Perry explained to Aerosmith biographer Stephen Davis:

The tracks were the stuff we'd been working on at our apartment on Beacon Street in the summer of '73. I wrote the riff to "Same Old Song and Dance" one night in the front room and Steven just started to sing along. "Spaced" happened the same way in the studio, with a lot of input from Jack. "S.O.S." meant "Same Old Shit" and came from the rehearsals at the Drummer's Image ... "Lord of the Thighs" and "Seasons of Wither" were Steven's songs. Of all the ballads Aerosmith has done, "Wither" was the one I liked best.

"Lord of the Thighs" was the last song written for Get Your Wings. The band needed one additional song for the album, so they locked themselves in Studio C at the Record Plant in New York City and came up with this song, based on the unsavory characters near their hotel on Eighth Avenue. In his memoir, Tyler explains that the song's lyrics "came from the seedy area where we recorded the album. "Lord of the Thighs" was about a pimp and the wildlife out on the street." Tyler plays the piano on the track, the opening beat of which is similar to the one Kramer would play a year later in "Walk This Way". The title was a pun on the famous William Golding novel Lord of the Flies, and "the critics hated us for this. We weren't supposed to be smart enough to use literary references."

The cover of "Train Kept A-Rollin'" was previously made popular by one of Aerosmith's favorite bands, the Yardbirds. Steven Tyler, Joe Perry, and Tom Hamilton had performed the song prior to joining Aerosmith. Perry stated that "Train" was the one song "we all had in common when we came together." Steven's band had played 'Train' and Tom and I played it in our band ... It's a blues song, if you follow its roots all the way back ... I always thought if I could just play one song, it would be that one because of what it does to me". Perry's band began performing the song regularly after he had been moved by the performance of "Stroll On" in Blowup; Tyler recalled his band opened for the Yardbirds in 1966: "I had seen the Yardbirds play somewhere the previous summer with both Jeff Beck and Jimmy Page in the band ... In Westport [at their supporting gig on October 22, 1966] we found out that Jeff had left the band and Jimmy was playing lead guitar by himself. I watched him from the edge of the stage and all I can say is that he knocked my tits off. They did 'Train Kept A-Rollin'' and it was just so heavy. They were just an un-fuckin'-believable band. The song was an early feature of Aerosmith's concerts and a frequent show closer, including for their first gig in 1970. Notable for its start/stop groove, the song became a core part of the band's live set for a time, and still occasionally ended concerts late in their career. In 1997, drummer Joey Kramer explained to Alan Di Perna of Guitar World that its unique rhythmic feel originated "probably just from jamming on it at soundcheck and experimenting with putting a James Brown kind of beat behind it. I played with a lot of R&B-type groups before joining Aerosmith."

Tyler recounts writing "Seasons of Wither" in his memoir: "When I wrote the music to "Seasons of Wither" I grabbed the old acoustic guitar Joey found in the garbage on Beacon Street with no strings. I put four strings on it, which is all it would take because it was so warped, went to the basement, and tried to find the words to match the scat sounds in my head, like automatic writing. The place was a mess, and I moved all the shit aside, put a rug down, popped three Tuinals, snorted some blow, sat down on the floor, tuned the guitar to that tuning, that special tuning that I thought I came up with. He continues, "Seasons of Wither" was about the winter landscape near this house I was living in with Joey near an old chicken farm. I used to lie in my bed at dawn, listening to the wind in the bare trees, how lonely and melancholy it sounded. One night I went down to the basement where we had a rug on the floor and a couple of boxes for furniture and took a few Tuinals and a few Seconals and I scooped up this guitar Joey gave me, this dumpster guitar, and I lit some incense and wrote "Seasons of Wither"."

The closing "Pandora's Box" was originally written by Kramer, who recalled in 1997: "The summer before, we'd rented a farmhouse in East Thetford, Vermont, while we were rehearsing in New Hampshire, and that's where I wrote the melody of 'Pandora's Box.' Steven wrote the lines about women's liberation, a big new issue in those times." According to Douglas, the clarinet at the start of the track is a union engineer playing "I'm in the Mood for Love".

== Recording ==
Get Your Wings was recorded at the Record Plant in New York City between December 1973 and January 1974. Jack Douglas served as producer and Jay Messina engineered the sessions. Douglas, a Record Plant engineer, had previously worked with The Who, John Lennon and Patti Smith. Douglas was asked by Aerosmith's managers Leber and Krebs to produce the sessions after success engineering the debut for one of their other artists, The New York Dolls. Douglas lived in Greenwich Village and hung out at Max's Kansas City and had close relationships with the Dolls, Patti Smith, Lou Reed and other members of that artistic community. After successfully reigning in the rambuctious and drug-addled New York Dolls, Douglas remembers Aerosmith's managers asking, "'Maybe you'd like to take a look at our baby band?' which was Aerosmith. 'We don't know if they're going any good or not!...' I said 'Sure, send me off to Boston hear them!' Because of my love for the Yardbirds, after the show, we sat down, we started to talk about [Jimmy] Page and Eric [Clapton] and the guitar sound, the influence of the band. It turned out that we had so much in common, the band and myself, that we just hit it off. And so we started a very long relationship." According to Perry, Columbia had wanted the band to work with Bob Ezrin, who was also a producer with Alice Cooper. It was Ezrin who introduced the band to Douglas, and for "all practical purposes, Jack became our producer. Ezrin might have shown up three or four times, but only to make suggestions, like bringing in additional musicians to augment our sound." Perry continues,

"They really pulled my nuts out of the fire, because Columbia was going to dump us after the first record. Then when Bob came around he got Jack in the driver's seat, it was like, okay, we're set to go. But this record was the first one that didn't include a bunch of material that we'd been playing for years in clubs and theaters and on the road. It was the first time we had to go in and actually write stuff on the clock, and so it was the first record where we moved past the sophomore blues. We got to use the Record Plant and Jack was there to help us, kind of guide us through that."

Prior to the sessions, the band moved into an apartment in Brookline and began intensive rehearsals in a dungeon-like basement of a store called Drummer's Image on Newbury Street. Douglas later recalled, "To the best of my memory, the preproduction work for Get Your Wings started in the back of a restaurant that was like a Mob hangout in the North End. I commuted there from the Copley Plaza Hotel and they started to play me the songs they had for their new album. My attitude was: 'What can I do to make them sound like themselves?'" The rehearsals gave the group time to write additional material and finalize the songs for the album prior to going into the studio. Douglas explains,

"When Aerosmith came back off the road, they not only were road warriors, they were killer musicians, and they rocked so hard. And this was the first time we had a pre-production period. It established the fact that we were going to have long pre-production periods, because it's easier to spend money in a rehearsal studio than it is to spend money in a recording studio. It meant that we went in with just germs of ideas, but Joe always had tons of these great riffs. Brad had riffs, and Tom had riffs, and it was a matter of sitting in a room and seeing where they were going, and Steven would act like a ringmaster, barking and jumping around and going crazy, and Joe would be the guy laying down the whole thing, you know, 'Here I could go here, I could go there.' It was a really interesting time to do it, turning little germs into songs."

Douglas invited outside guitarists and a saxophone player to play on some of the tracks. "On 'Same Old Song And Dance', I told them that we should bring in some horns to bring out their rhythm and blues side," said producer Jack Douglas. "They definitely had that kind of style and sound already. We got the Brecker Brothers to play on that. The sax solo is Michael Brecker." Dick Wagner, a session guitarist and member of Alice Cooper, plays the guitar solo on "Same Old Song and Dance", and also contributes guitars along with Steve Hunter to "Train Kept A-Rollin'". Wagner remembers playing on "Train Kept A-Rollin'" and a couple other tracks: "Joe hadn't yet developed into the player he is today. He's up in the big leagues now but back in those days the stuff was more simplistic. Obviously for some reason he wasn't there to do it and I never really questioned it. At the time I was living at The Plaza Hotel in NYC just waiting for the phone to ring. It was either Ezrin or Jack Douglas who would call me up and ask me to come over. For that session Jack called me up at like ten o'clock in the evening and I went in and did it and that was it." In an interview, Brad Whitford confirms the use of outside guitarists on "Same Old Song and Dance" as well as "S.O.S. (Too Bad)" and acknowledges that "I don't think I made it onto 'Lord of the Thighs', either. It was Jack who had the difficult task of breaking the news to Joe and me, and of course, that went down like a lead balloon. At first you fight, and you're a little bit angry, and then you get sad to where you're like really bummed out that you can't do it. And the thing was that we'd done some good stuff and could play good stuff, but the tracks required some real finesse, you know?" Douglas explains the decision to bring in outside guitarists:

"The big challenge for the band was that Joe and Brad were not the guitar players they had in their mind to be. They wanted to play these solos like Jeff Beck and Eric Clapton, but they didn't have the technical expertise to do that. I suggested that for a number of tracks we bring in someone else to play the leads. They wanted to kill me. 'What! On our own record. Some of the most important leads on our own record?' I said, 'But no one will ever know. We are not going to announce it. There would be no names on the record.' I brought in Steve Hunter and Dick Wagner. One guy became Brad and one guy became Joe and they played very important solos across that album. Steven, by the way, was totally with me on this."

For "Train Kept A-Rollin'", the group desired to capture a live version of the song, but producer Jack Douglas persuaded them to record a studio version instead. The song was recorded in two parts, with the second half featuring a faux-live sound. According to Hunter, "We wanted to keep the solos equal so we'd sit down and go through the material so it was totally even. We didn't want it to look like there was a rhythm guitar player and a lead guitar player, because that's what we both did". Hunter later elaborated: "Aerosmith was in Studio C of The Record Plant and I was doing work with Bob Ezrin in Studio A. I had a long wait between dubs and was waiting in the lobby. Jack Douglas popped his head out of Studio C and asked 'Hey, do you feel like playing?' I said sure, so I grabbed my guitar and went in. I had two run-throughs, then Jack said 'great that's it!' That turned out to be the opening solos on 'Train Kept A Rollin'". According to Douglas, the crowd noise at the end of the track was taken from a "wild track" from The Concert for Bangladesh, which he had worked on. The single version omits the echo and crowd noise.

In a change from their debut album, Douglas insisted that Tyler use his natural singing voice on the record. Douglas explains, "I insisted that Steven sing with his real voice. On that first album he had this voice that wasn't even him. It was like a made up voice that he thought sounded English or something. I said, 'You gotta be kidding me. With the pipes that you have, there's no way you are going to sing, "Dream On", that way. Let's get back to your real voice.' When that album came out I got a lot of hate mail from fans saying what did you do to Steven's voice, but it paid off, as did the ghost guitar players who taught Brad and Joe how to play those solos that were on the record. Note for note, here is how you do it. The band went out on the road for a year and came back to me to do Toys in the Attic. When they came back they were totally different. They were great players."

In 2014, Perry reflected on the sessions, "We all put in endless hours, fueled by whatever substances were available ... I knew the album, in spite of a few bright spots, still didn't capture the power of the band. We were better than the record we were making. And yet I didn't know how to get there. I didn't know how to get from good to great." "On the second album," Tyler noted, "the songs found my voice. I realized that it's not about having a beautiful voice and hitting all the notes; it's about attitude."

== Critical reception ==
Professional ratings
Review scores
Source	Rating
AllMusic	4.5/5 stars
Blender	4/5 stars
Christgau's Record Guide	B−
Collector's Guide to Heavy Metal	10/10
The Encyclopedia of Popular Music	3/5 stars
The Rolling Stone Album Guide	3/5 stars
Uncut	3/5 stars

Contemporary reviews were mostly positive. In his article for Rolling Stone, Charley Walters praised the LP, writing that "the snarling chords of guitarists Joe Perry and Brad Whitford tautly propel each number, jibing neatly with the rawness of singer Steven Tyler, whose discipline is evident no matter how he shrieks, growls, or spits out the lyrics." Billboard reviewer called the music "derivative", but added that the band's "tough and nasty rock'n'roll vision" could be successful with the help of the right producers. Music critic Robert Christgau wrote that the band were "inheritors of the Grand Funk principle: if a band is going to be dumb, it might as well be American dumb. Here they're loud and cunning enough to provide a real treat for the hearing-impaired, at least on side one."

In a retrospective review for AllMusic, Stephen Thomas Erlewine declared that Get Your Wings was when Aerosmith "shed much of their influences and developed their own trademark sound, it's where they turned into songwriters, it's where Steven Tyler unveiled his signature obsessions with sex and sleaze ... they're doing their bloozy bluster better and bolder, which is what turns this sophomore effort into their first classic." Ben Mitchell of Blender had the same impression and wrote that Aerosmith locked into their "trademark dirty funk" and "firmly established their simple lyrical blueprint: smut and high times" on this album. Canadian critic Martin Popoff praised the album and called it a "rich, inspired and consistently entertaining rock 'n' roller, a record much more intelligent than much metal to this point in time".

== Track listing ==
Side one
No.	Title	Writer(s)	Length
1.	"Same Old Song and Dance"	Steven Tyler, Joe Perry	3:53
2.	"Lord of the Thighs"	Tyler	4:14
3.	"Spaced"	Tyler, Perry	4:21
4.	"Woman of the World"	Tyler, Don Solomon	5:49

Side two
No.	Title	Writer(s)	Length
1.	"S.O.S. (Too Bad)"	Tyler	2:51
2.	"Train Kept A Rollin'"	Tiny Bradshaw, Howard Kay, Lois Mann	5:33
3.	"Seasons of Wither"	Tyler	5:38
4.	"Pandora's Box"	Tyler, Joey Kramer	5:43

== Personnel ==
Personnel taken from Get Your Wings liner notes.

Aerosmith

- Steven Tyler – lead vocals, harmonica, piano on "Lord of the Thighs" and "Pandora's Box", acoustic guitar on "Seasons of Wither"
- Joe Perry – electric guitar, 12-string guitar, slide guitar, acoustic guitar
- Brad Whitford – rhythm guitar, lead guitar on "Lord Of Thighs"
- Tom Hamilton – bass guitar
- Joey Kramer – drums, percussion

Additional musicians

- Steve Hunter – lead guitar on "Train Kept a Rollin'" (first half)
- Dick Wagner – lead guitar on "Train Kept a Rollin'" (second half) and "Same Old Song and Dance"
- Michael Brecker – tenor saxophone on "Same Old Song and Dance" and "Pandora's Box"
- Randy Brecker – trumpet on "Same Old Song and Dance"
- Stan Bronstein – baritone saxophone on "Same Old Song and Dance" and "Pandora's Box"
- Jon Pearson – trombone on "Same Old Song and Dance"
- Ray Colcord – keyboards on "Spaced"

Production

- Jack Douglas – producer, engineer, Quadraphonic remix supervision
- Ray Colcord – producer
- Bob Ezrin – executive producer
- Jay Messina, Rod O'Brien – engineers

Remastering personnel

- Don DeVito – remastering producer
- Vic Anesini – remastering engineer
- Lisa Sparagano, Ken Fredette – package design
- Jimmy Ienner, Jr. – Still Life photography
- Leslie Lambert – Still Life collage design
- Joel Zimmerman – art supervision
- Jay Messina – Quadraphonic remix engineer

== Charts ==
Chart (1974)	Peak position
US Billboard 200	74

== Certification ==
Region	Certification	Certified units/sales
Canada (Music Canada)	Platinum	100,000^{^}
United States (RIAA)	3× Platinum	3,000,000^{^}
^{^} Shipments figures based on certification alone.
