= S.O.S. (Too Bad) =

1975 single by Aerosmith

Single by Aerosmith

from the album Get Your Wings
- B-side: "Lord of the Thighs"
- Released: February 20, 1975
- Studio: Record Plant (New York City)
- Genre: Proto-punk
- Length: 2:51
- Label: Columbia
- Songwriter: Steven Tyler
- Producer: Jack Douglas

Aerosmith singles chronology
"Train Kept A-Rollin'" (1974)	"S.O.S. (Too Bad)" (1975)	"Sweet Emotion" (1975)

"S.O.S. (Too Bad)" is a song by American rock band Aerosmith. It was released in 1975 as the third single from their second album, Get Your Wings (1974).

== Background ==
Written by Steven Tyler, it is a hard rocking song focusing on sex and sleaze, with a chorus of "I'm a bad, lonely school boy, and I'm a rat, and it's too bad, can't get me none of that." The song starts off with a fast drum beat and basic guitar riff, then slows down, and builds up once again, with Steven Tyler's rapid-fire, fierce lyrics accompanying. The song's lyrical content and musical styles are in the vein of "blooze", a grittier hard rock version of blues music, often with lyrics focused on sex, drugs, and urban life.

"S.O.S. (Too Bad") has been described as a proto-punk song, with numerous elements presaging the punk rock explosion, including dark lyrical themes.

Record World said "Here comes [Aerosmith's] hard rock supreme to the rescue."

The song has remained a fan favorite and has been a staple in the setlists on Aerosmith's most recent tours, the Rockin' the Joint Tour and the Route of All Evil Tour.
