= Seasons of Wither =

Song by Aerosmith

from the album Get Your Wings
- Released: March 15, 1974
- Studio: Record Plant (New York City)
- Genre: Hard rock
- Length: 5:38
- Label: Columbia
- Songwriter: Steven Tyler
- Producer: Jack Douglas

"Seasons of Wither" is a power ballad by American rock band Aerosmith. It was written by lead singer Steven Tyler and is five minutes and thirty-eight seconds in length. It was released in 1974 on the band's second studio album, Get Your Wings.

== Background ==
According to Tyler, the song was inspired by the Massachusetts landscape in wintertime. He stated that " used to lie in my bed at dawn, listening to the wind in the bare trees, how lonely and melancholy it sounded. I was pissed off about my taxes and getting mad helps me to write, so one night I went down to the basement where we had a rug on the floor and a couple of boxes for furniture and took a few Tuinals and a few Seconals and I scooped up this guitar Joey gave me, this Dumpster guitar, and I lit some incense and wrote ‘Seasons of Wither.'”

The song's lyrics also discuss a relationship. It is one of Tyler's favorite Aerosmith songs. The song features acoustic guitars, slow haunting vocals, and a strong rhythm. The Get Your Wings version starts off with a crowd of people cheering, which gradually fades into the howling wind and acoustic guitar (played by Tyler) that signal the beginning of the song. This is a segue from the previous track, "Train Kept A-Rollin'".

== Legacy ==
While not released as a single, the song has gained prominence over the years. It was featured on the career-spanning compilation's Pandora's Box in 1991, O, Yeah! Ultimate Aerosmith Hits in 2002 and on the live album Rockin' the Joint in 2005.

Additionally, the song has been resurrected as a live staple among Aerosmith shows in the 2000s, after not being played much on tours in the late 1980s and 1990s. However, the song was performed at the band's MTV Unplugged performance in 1990. On the Just Push Play Tour in 2001, Tyler and Joe Perry would start off the song at the top of a dual staircase. On the Route of All Evil Tour (2006) and World Tour (2007), Tyler and Joe Perry would start off the song sitting down on chairs at the end of the catwalk.

The song has been covered by Die Kreuzen on the album Gone Away, Tesla on the Real to Reel 2 album and by Vitamin String Quartet on their Aerosmith tribute album. Boston pianist Yoko Miwa has recorded an instrumental jazz version with her trio, and Seattle's defunct Mother Love Bone (Pearl Jam's precursor) also recorded their version, which is available on scattered bootlegs. It can be found on YouTube as well as the “Dogtown and Z-boys” motion picture soundtrack.
