= Same Old Song and Dance =

Song by Aerosmith

Single by Aerosmith

from the album Get Your Wings
- B-side: "Pandora's Box"
- Released: March 19, 1974
- Recorded: December 17, 1973 – January 14, 1974
- Studio: Record Plant, New York City
- Genre: Hard rock; rock and roll
- Length: 3:53 (album version); 2:59 (single version)
- Label: Columbia
- Songwriters: Steven Tyler; Joe Perry
- Producers: Jack Douglas; Ray Colcord

Aerosmith singles chronology
"Dream On" (1973)	"Same Old Song and Dance" (1974)	"Train Kept A-Rollin'" (1974)

"Same Old Song and Dance" is a song by American rock band Aerosmith, written by singer Steven Tyler and guitarist Joe Perry. Released on March 19, 1974, as the lead single from their second studio album, Get Your Wings, it has remained a staple on classic rock radio and in the band's setlists.

== Structure ==
The song was built around a riff that Joe Perry came up with while sitting on his amp. Steven Tyler quickly came up with the lyrics, which are sung in sync with the main riff. The song is known for its upbeat rhythm and the duelling guitars of Perry and Brad Whitford, along with interspersed horns. Dick Wagner (Alice Cooper, Lou Reed) plays the guitar solo on the Get Your Wings recording. "On 'Same Old Song And Dance', I told them that we should bring in some horns to bring out their rhythm and blues side," said producer Jack Douglas. "They definitely had that kind of style and sound already. We got the Brecker Brothers to play on that. The sax solo is Michael Brecker."

== Reception ==
Cash Box called it a "top flight hard rocker."Record World said that it was "one of the most straightshootin' rockers of the year" and called it a "literate, variegated variant on the 'Marc Bolan boogie,' rhythmically and lyrically."

== Live performances ==
The song remains a fan favorite and a staple in the band's shows. The band often does an extended jam during it in concert, often resulting in the song extending two minutes over its original running time. This extended jam at the end of a song is used as a showcase for bassist Tom Hamilton. Tyler is also known to do his trademark scat singing during these jams.

== On other albums ==
"Same Old Song and Dance" has been featured on Aerosmith compilations including Greatest Hits (1980) (where the song is remastered, 52 seconds of the song are edited out and the first line from one of the verses is changed from "Got you with your cocaine..." to "Shady-looking loser..."), Pandora's Box (1991), O, Yeah! Ultimate Aerosmith Hits (2002), and Greatest Hits 1973–1988 (2004). The song can also be found on the live albums Classics Live II (1987), A Little South of Sanity (1998) and Rockin' the Joint (2005), and the live DVD You Gotta Move (2004).

== In popular culture ==
The song is mentioned in the Season 5 episode "Gaza" of the American TV series The West Wing. It also appears in the video game Guitar Hero III: Legends of Rock.
