= Sweet Emotion =

1975 single by Aerosmith

Single by Aerosmith

from the album Toys in the Attic
- B-side: "Uncle Salty"
- Released: May 19, 1975
- Recorded: March 14, 1975
- Studio: Record Plant, New York City
- Genre: Hard rock; funk rock; psychedelic funk
- Length: 3:09 (single version); 4:34 (album version)
- Label: Columbia
- Songwriters: Steven Tyler; Tom Hamilton
- Producer: Jack Douglas

Aerosmith singles chronology
| "S.O.S. (Too Bad)" (1974) | "Sweet Emotion" (1975) | "Walk This Way" (1975) |

Audio sample
- Sweet Emotion: file; help

Music video
- "Sweet Emotion" on YouTube

"Sweet Emotion" is a song by the American rock band Aerosmith, released in 1975 on their third studio album Toys in the Attic by Columbia Records. It was released as a single on May 19, 1975. The song began a string of pop hits and large-scale success for the band that would continue for the remainder of the 1970s. The song was written by lead singer Steven Tyler and bassist Tom Hamilton, produced by Jack Douglas and recorded at Record Plant studio.

"Sweet Emotion" remains a staple track of both classic rock and Aerosmith's discography, as well as their live performances. In 2004, Rolling Stone magazine ranked "Sweet Emotion" #416 on its list of the 500 Greatest Songs of All Time.

== Success ==
"Sweet Emotion" was released as a single on May 19, 1975, and peaked at No. 36 on the US Billboard Hot 100, becoming the band's breakthrough single and their first Top 40 hit. The day it hit No. 36 on the U.S. chart, July 19, 1975, Aerosmith was booked at a gig in New York City's Central Park, called the Schaefer Music Festival. The song and consequently the album that went into the Top 10 were so successful that the band decided to ride the heels of success and re-release one of their first singles, the power ballad "Dream On", which had originally charted at No. 59 in 1973. The re-released version went on to hit No. 6, the highest chart performance in the 1970s for the band. "Sweet Emotion" remains successful in the modern day, having sold over three million digital downloads.

Cash Box said that with "Sweet Emotion" "Aerosmith explodes with inspired harmony, virtuosity in some searing guitar licks, and powerful production by Jack Douglas."

== Song structure ==
"Tom Hamilton wrote the music for 'Sweet Emotion,'" recalled producer Jack Douglas. "He had that bassline. And when Joey Kramer came in, he played on the twos and fours instead of the ones and threes, so he was playing on the backside of it. When we heard that, we went, 'Oh, boy! Magic.'"

"Sweet Emotion" is a hard rock, funk rock and psychedelic funk song with a repeated electric bass riff tracked alongside the bass marimba, played by Jay Messina in the beginning. Steven Tyler shakes a packet of sugar in place of maracas, as none were available. He also plays the vibraslap, which he revealed on the Howard Stern show that the vibraslap broke the third time he hit it, which can still be heard in the final recording. The introduction builds with the use of a talk box by Joe Perry, which has become one of the most famous uses of the guitar talk box in popular music (Perry's guitar "sings" the line "sweet emotion" over Hamilton's bass riff). Eventually Tyler joins in, singing in unison with Perry's talk box. The talk box device used was called The Bag, made by Kustom Electronics. The now discontinued device had been used by guitarists including Jeff Beck and Mike Pinera.

The song kicks into a more rocking rhythm with dueling guitars, and rapid-fire angry-sounding lyrics sung by Tyler. The chorus consists of a repeating guitar riff followed by a mirror of the "sweet emotion" intro.

On the 1980 compilation Aerosmith's Greatest Hits, "Sweet Emotion" appears in edited form. The bass and talk box introduction is removed, and the track begins with the chorus that precedes the first verse. The guitar solo at the end of the song is also removed, and the track concludes with the chorus, which repeats as the song fades. This edit was used for the original single release of the song, which was replaced in subsequent pressings with the album version from Toys in the Attic.

== Personnel ==
=== Aerosmith ===
- Steven Tyler – lead vocals, sugar packet, vibraslap
- Joe Perry – lead guitar, talk box, backing vocals
- Brad Whitford – rhythm guitar
- Tom Hamilton – bass
- Joey Kramer – drums, percussion

=== Additional personnel ===
- Jay Messina – marimba

== Legacy ==
The song has been included on almost every Aerosmith compilation and live album, including Aerosmith's Greatest Hits, Pandora's Box, Pandora's Toys, O, Yeah! Ultimate Aerosmith Hits, Devil's Got a New Disguise, Live! Bootleg, Classics Live I, A Little South of Sanity, Greatest Hits 1973–1988 and Rockin' the Joint.

It is often included on "greatest song" lists or "greatest rock song" lists, including a ranking of No. 408 on Rolling Stone magazine's 500 Greatest Songs of All Time.

The song has been prominently used in several movies, including the opening scene of the 1993 American coming-of-age comedy film Dazed and Confused and a scene of the 2013 American comedy film We're the Millers, where Jennifer Aniston's stripper character Rose O'Reilly performs a strip routine. It was also included in a teaser trailer for the 2015 American animated film Inside Out.

== Re-release ==
The original recording was remixed by David Thoener and released as a single in 1991 in coordination with the release of the band's box set Pandora's Box, although the remixed version was not in the box set. The difference from the original is that the drums are mixed louder with more reverb, the instrumental segue between verses is twice as long and the same as the segue between the 2nd and 4th verses and their subsequent choruses, and a guitar harmony has been added at the fade-out. A new music video was filmed and released in support of the single. The re-released version reached No. 36 on the Mainstream Rock Tracks chart and No. 74 in the United Kingdom. The single version (4:38) of the remixed version was later issued on the bonus disc in the band's 1994 box set Box of Fire and the full-length album version of the remix (5:10) was released on the soundtrack to the 1998 film Armageddon.

=== Music video ===
The video for the re-released version is based on a phone sex conversation. The video, directed by Marty Callner, shows a young man under his covers with a magazine which is advertising a phone sex line. The young man, who says he is a 26-year-old attorney, and the phone sex operator talk about each other for a while, until it goes into a shot of the band performing in a basement (this portion of the video was actually recorded in an old warehouse in the Charlestown Navy Yard, which substituted as the band's old apartment on 1325 Commonwealth Avenue in Boston). It switches back-and-forth between Aerosmith performing "Sweet Emotion" and the phone conversation. At the very end, both the phone sex operator and the young man are shown to be very different from each other's perceptions; she is an overweight older woman with a baby living in a rundown house, and he is a teenage boy. Throughout most of the video, Perry is playing a Gibson Les Paul but plays the solo on a Fender Stratocaster.

The video is also a homage to the 1983 film Risky Business, in that the opening scenes of the young man talking to the woman are almost identical to the scenes in the film of Tom Cruise's character talking on the phone to the call girl.

== Release history ==
| Region | Date | Format | A-Side/Tracks | Time | B-Side/AA-Side | Time | Label | Catalog # | Barcode | Edition | Series | Notes |
|---|---|---|---|---|---|---|---|---|---|---|---|---|
| US | May 1975 | 7-inch 45 RPM | Sweet Emotion (Edit/Mono) | 3:09 | Sweet Emotion (Edit/Stereo) | 3:09 | Columbia/CBS | 3-10155 | — | Demonstration | — | Co. Sleeve |
| US | May 19, 1975 | 7-inch 45 RPM | Sweet Emotion (Edit) | 3:09 | Uncle Salty (Edit) | 3:30 | Columbia/CBS | 3-10155 | — | — | — | Co. Sleeve |
| US | Oct 1991 | CD Single | Sweet Emotion (Remix) | 4:34 | — | — | Columbia/SMEI | CSK 4219 | — | Demonstration | — | Picture Card |
| US | October 31, 1991 | CS Maxi-Single | Sweet Emotion (Remix) Subway Circle Jerk | 4:34 3:28 3:37 | Sweet Emotion (Remix) Subway Circle Jerk | 4:34 3:28 3:37 | Columbia/SMEI | 38T 74101 | 098707410147 | — | — | Picture Sleeve |

== Charts ==
| Chart (1975) | Peak position |
|---|---|
| Canada Top Singles (RPM) | 56 |
| US Billboard Hot 100 | 36 |

== Certifications ==
| Region | Certification | Certified units/sales |
|---|---|---|
| New Zealand (RMNZ) | 2× Platinum | 60,000^{‡} |
| United Kingdom (BPI) | Gold | 400,000^{‡} |
| United States (RIAA) | 3× Platinum | 3,000,000^{‡} |
^{‡} Sales+streaming figures based on certification alone.

== Bibliography ==
- Dafydd Rees & Luke Crampton (1991). Rock Movers & Shakers. Billboard Books, ISBN 978-0874366617
