= Toys in the Attic (album) =

1975 studio album by Aerosmith

Studio album by Aerosmith
- Released: April 8, 1975
- Recorded: January–March 1975
- Studios: Record Plant, New York City
- Genres: Hard rock; blues rock
- Length: 37:08
- Label: Columbia
- Producer: Jack Douglas

Aerosmith chronology
Get Your Wings (1974)	Toys in the Attic (1975)	Rocks (1976)

Singles from Toys in the Attic
- 1. "Sweet Emotion" Released: May 19, 1975; 2. "Walk This Way" Released: August 28, 1975; 3. "You See Me Crying" Released: November 11, 1975

Toys in the Attic is the third studio album by American rock band Aerosmith, released on April 8, 1975, by Columbia Records. Its first single, "Sweet Emotion", was released on May 19 and the original version of "Walk This Way" followed on August 28 in the same year. The album is the band's most commercially successful studio LP in the United States, with nine million copies sold, according to the RIAA. In 2003, the album was ranked No. 228 on Rolling Stone's list of The 500 Greatest Albums of All Time. The album's title track and their 1986 collaboration with Run-DMC on a cover version of "Walk This Way" are included on the Rock and Roll Hall of Fame list of the "500 Songs that Shaped Rock and Roll".

== Background ==
For Aerosmith's previous album, Get Your Wings, the band had begun working with record producer Jack Douglas, who co-produced that album with Ray Colcord. In the liner notes to the 1993 reissue of Greatest Hits, it was said by an unnamed member of the group that they "nailed" the album.

According to Douglas, "Aerosmith was a different band when we started the third album. They'd been playing Get Your Wings on the road for a year and had become better players - different. It showed in the riffs that Joe [Perry] and Brad [Whitford] brought back from the road for the next album. Toys in the Attic was a much more sophisticated record than the other stuff they'd done." In the band memoir Walk This Way, guitarist Joe Perry stated, "When we started to make Toys in the Attic, our confidence was built up from constant touring." In his autobiography, Perry elaborated:

Our first two albums were basically comprised of songs we'd been playing for years live in the clubs. With Toys, we started from scratch. Making this record, we learned to be recording artists and write songs on a deadline. In the process, we began to see just what Aerosmith could accomplish. With everyone throwing in ideas, Toys was our breakthrough. That breakthrough was facilitated by Jack Douglas ... In the studio he moved into the slot of the sixth member of the band.

== Writing ==
Aerosmith's third album includes some of their best-known songs, including "Walk This Way", "Sweet Emotion", and the title track. The band entered the sessions with just three or four songs, and for the first time, wrote most of the material while recording. Prior to the sessions, the group booked rehearsal time to write material, shape the songs, and prepare for the recording sessions. Douglas explains,

By the time we got to Toys in the Attic we were spending at least two months in pre-production. I understood they couldn't write on the road. We would spend a great deal of time in the pre-production situation and could come up with a lot of good material. I understood what each member of the band brought to the table. I knew if Joe was coming to me with this lick the followup to that lick would be something that maybe Brad would have. I could go around the room and we could keep adding things. And Steven is really a musical savant, quite brilliant. He was a great umpire. He'd say, 'Don't go any further! I think you're onto it, right there. Do that again!' That's how it worked, month after month, in preproduction. We would take it into the studio and it wasn't totally written in stone, but just tight enough to allow a good deal of improvisation.

Tyler would write lyrics as the music was completed. Douglas explains, "Steven was a tormented lyricist — a brilliant lyricist, but absolutely tormented, and as time went on, he became more and more tormented to come up with lyrics. The band, and particularly Joe, could just rip out these great riffs. Steven was a brilliant lyricist, and funny, and self-deprecating and aware of what was going on in the world and what was going on in the streets, but he had set a bar for himself that was so high that it was really difficult for him. Perry continues, "It is really hard to have everything make sense, tell a story rhythmically, rhyme, fit in the fabric, and he's got his own demons that he has to satisfy. He would basically take the tracks, and put headphones on and just walk around wherever he could, whether it was walking around the block in New York or at his house walking around the yard, or walking around the neighborhood, and he would just kind of sing along to it until he got something."

Perry remembers their creative process during the sessions, and writing the title track, "Toys in the Attic": "Toys was the first time we went in the studio without a whole album's worth of songs. We had to write some in the studio. Jack Douglas said: 'We need one more rocker.' And I sat on an amp and just started playing a riff. It was the riff to the song "Toys In The Attic". Tyler adds, "Joe was jamming a riff and I started yelling, 'Toys, toys, toys ...' Organic, immediate, infectious ... I just started singing and it fit like chocolate and peanut butter. Joe plays his ass off on that song."

"Uncle Salty" is credited to both Tyler and bassist Hamilton, who came up with the riff. He explains, "I came up with it within the first year the band was together. Then we didn't use it until the third album. That's typical with me. I'll come up with a musical idea and be very reluctant to show it to people. I guess it's just inhibitions that I've got to work on breaking down, because it usually works out really well when I finally do get up the gumption to show it to people." Tyler recalls writing the lyrics in his 2001 autobiography, "Here I was thinking about an orphanage when I wrote those lyrics. I'd try to make the melody weep from the sadness felt when a child is abandoned." Tyler continues, "Salty worked in a home for lost children and had his way with this little girl. That's what it's about. I'm the little girl, the orphaned boy. I put myself in that place. I'm Uncle Salty too."

Of the biblical "Adam's Apple", Tyler says, "I don't remember anything except I arranged it and must have fought for credit. And I originally wanted to call the album Love at First Bite after the line in the song."

The album also features a cover of Bull Moose Jackson's "Big Ten-Inch Record", a risque R&B hit recorded in 1952 and first heard by the band on a tape of Dr. Demento's radio show on KMET. Tyler explains, "Years ago I had this friend who would send me tapes of his radio show, and that's how we ended up covering 'Big Ten-Inch Record.' Demento is a wonderful guy." Rather than produce a rock reimagining, Aerosmith's cover largely stays true to the original song, down to its jazz-style instrumentation. Brad Whitford explains, "We heard the original and played it for laughs. We played it for our producer and he said 'Let's do it. Not only that, let's do it like they did it then, with the horns and everything'. We thought, 'Hey, that might be a good idea'."

Bassist Tom Hamilton came up with the main riff on "Sweet Emotion", partially inspired by the Jeff Beck composition "Rice Pudding". Hamilton explains its history: "Believe it or not, the intro to the song and the bass part that I play during the verses, were written while I was in high school. I just kept it in the back of my mind for years... at the end of the recording for the tracks for Toys in the Attic, we still didn't have that song. That song was never planned to be on the album. Our producer one day said, 'It's jam day, we got the tracks done, so if anyone has any extra ideas floating around, lets hear it now.' I said, 'I've got these parts,' and I showed the guitar players how to play the guitar parts I wrote. By the end of the day we had the music done and Steven then put on the vocals." He continues, "I wrote that line on bass, and I realized I should think of some guitar parts for it if I was ever going to get a chance to present it to the band. I didn't think I ever would ... Steven had the idea of taking that intro riff, which became the chorus bass line under the "sweet emotion" part, and transposing it into the key of E, and making it a really heavy Led Zeppelinesque thing. Producer Jack Douglas recalls, "He had that bassline. And when Joey Kramer came in, he played on the twos and fours instead of the ones and threes, so he was playing on the backside of it. When we heard that, we went, 'Oh, boy! Magic.'" The song's lyrics, particularly the first verse, were inspired by Tyler's acrimonious relationship with Perry's then-wife, Elyssa. Tyler explains, "I was angry at Elyssa because she stole my boyfriend, my significant other, my partner in crime. It was like losing a brother. So now there was jealousy, this dark undercurrent humming along. And I put it into Sweet Emotion, which I pointed at Elyssa directly."

Tyler explains that "No More No More" was inspired by "life on the road: boredom, disillusion, Holiday Inns, stalemate, jailbait. My diary." "Sometimes I start thinking about having a wife and child, but the group is my carriage, pulling me right along, so I have no time for that now."

The most complex production on the album was "You See Me Crying", a piano ballad that was heavily orchestrated. The song was written by Tyler with credit given to former Chain Reaction bandmate Don Solomon. Tyler had written the opening and closing piano melody years earlier, having played it during the coda to "Dream On" on 1971: The Road Starts Hear.

=== "Walk This Way" ===
"Walk This Way"
20-second sample

In interviews, the band and Douglas have extensively detailed the writing of "Walk This Way" and each stage of its development. The song originated in December 1974 in Honolulu, Hawaii, where Aerosmith was opening for the Guess Who. During a soundcheck, Perry was "fooling around with riffs and thinking about the Meters". Loving that band's "riffy New Orleans funk, especially 'Cissy Strut' and 'People Say'", he asked drummer Joey Kramer "to lay down something flat with a groove on the drums", and the guitar riff to what would become "Walk This Way" just "came off [his] hands." Needing a bridge, he "played another riff and went there. But I didn't want the song to have a typical, boring 1, 4, 5 chord progression. After playing the first riff in the key of C, I shifted to E before returning to C for the verse and chorus. By the end of the sound check, I had the basics of a song."

When singer Steven Tyler heard Perry playing that riff he "ran out and sat behind the drums and [they] jammed." Tyler scatted "nonsensical words initially to feel where the lyrics should go before adding them later."

When the group was halfway through recording Toys in the Attic in early 1975 at Record Plant in New York City, they found themselves stuck for material. They had written three or four songs for the album, having "to write the rest in the studio." They decided to give the song Perry had come up with in Hawaii a try, but it did not have lyrics or a title yet. Douglas explains, "I told the band we needed one more up-tempo track, and Joe plays a burner, a thing so hot and hard and heavy that we're just totally blown away. It was the last track and Steven was struggling. We recorded it, and we couldn't come up with a lyric or a rhyme or a rhythm for a vocal. There was just no way that it had anything we could use. We thought we were going to have to lose the track, or maybe make it an instrumental, but it was so good and funky." Deciding to take a break from recording, band members and producer Jack Douglas went down to Times Square to see Mel Brooks' Young Frankenstein. Returning to the studio, they were laughing about Marty Feldman telling Gene Wilder to follow him in the film, saying "walk this way" and limping. Douglas suggested this as a title for their song. But they still needed lyrics.

We were working on that song and we took a break to go see the movie in Times Square... and we came to the part where Marty Feldman as Igor limps down the steps of the train platform and says to Gene Wilder "Walk this way", which Gene does with the same hideous limp. We fell over ourselves because it was so funny in a recognizably Three Stooges mode.

At the hotel that night, Tyler wrote lyrics for the song, but left them in the cab on the way to the studio next morning. He says: "I must have been stoned. All the blood drained out of my face, but no one believed me. They thought I never got around to writing them." Upset, he took a cassette tape with the instrumental track they had recorded and a portable tape player with headphones and "disappeared into the stairwell." He "grabbed a few No. 2 pencils" but forgot to take paper. He wrote the lyrics on the wall at "the Record Plant's top floor and then down a few stairs of the back stairway." After "two or three hours" he "ran downstairs for a legal pad and ran back up and copied them down."

The lyrics, which tell the story of a teenage boy losing his virginity, are sung by Tyler with heavy emphasis being placed on the rhyming lyrics. Douglas remembers, "Steven came back with the whole thing. He started with the chorus, 'Walk this way,' and then he came up with the most off the wall verse, which was early rap, maybe the first rap ever. Be-bop-dooty-dot-dan-bot-bot boddy-da-doot-ba-bada-da-dow. I mean, where did it come from? Clark Terry, Count Basie, you know? Steven had those roots, mind you, because he had a big musical catalog, so he had a lot of that stuff upstairs, but that he went for that was amazing."

Perry thought the "lyrics were so great," saying that Tyler, being a drummer, "likes to use words as a percussion element. The words have to tell a story, but for Steven they also have to have a bouncy feel for flow. Then he searches for words that have a double entendre, which comes out of the blues tradition." Perry remembers, "David Johansen from the Dolls called me. He said, 'That's the filthiest song I ever heard on the radio.' That was the other thing — Steven always wanted to put the double entendres in his stuff to see how close to the edge we could get, you know, without having to have stuff beeped out. Obviously, the whole song is so lascivious. It was a compliment to hear that from David, because the Dolls were no slouches when it came to that stuff."

== Recording ==
At the beginning of 1975, the band started working at The Record Plant in New York City for the album that became Toys in the Attic. The sessions for Toys in the Attic were produced by Douglas without Colcord – the album was engineered by Jay Messina with assistant engineers Rod O'Brien, Corky Stasiak and Dave Thoener.

Once again, Douglas booked rehearsal space for the band to allow time for creativity and help them to develop material for the album before going into the studio. Tom Hamilton remembers, "I just remember getting together with our producer, Jack Douglas, and we used to practice at this little sort of barn, that had been converted to a studio, about 20 miles outside of Boston. It was just a blast, we spent the days laughing and playing, goin' to movies and hangin' out at night." Engineer Jay Messina remembers, "Jack would get quite involved musically with the band, and lots of times have cool musical ideas for them that they were very receptive to, but generally it was Steven and Joe that were the creative driving force." Douglas continues, "We decided... to try a bunch of different things. Go in a whole bunch of different directions. The sass is there and the rock, but we wanted to try things like "Big Ten Inch Record" - bring in a little bit more sweetening, arrange a little bit more so it was less free playing; throw out a lot of stuff before we went into the studio. Also, that was the first album that we did together that was totally developed in the pre-production period. They had no songs - maybe one written before we started our pre-production. So that's when our relationship got a little bit tighter. We started working together a lot in arranging and developing songs from day one."

The songs for Toys in the Attic were recorded with a Spectrasonics mixing board and a 16-track tape recorder. Douglas explains, "We didn't think 16-tracks limited us. These guys could play live. It's not like Joey went out and played the drums and then we laid them in, and then we laid something over that, and there was a click track and all that. They just went out and played, all of them together. Once you got a headphone mix for the band and they could hear each other, they just let it rip. It was, everybody hands-on, and we were recording to 16-track. If there was a space somewhere, like on a backing vocals track, if there was eight bars that were empty, and we needed it to put a tambourine on, we would stick it on that track for eight bars. We would actually cut the multi-track, put a leader in, and then record, we would record so that when it passed the leader, that's where the backing vocal was would start, so we would take up every bit of space, and then if we had to continue the tambourine, we might go to another track that had some space. The track restrictions also forced you to go live to your EQ, your compression, your echo, as much as you could, to the track, as you were recording it." Perry continues, "My clearest memories are when we would do mixes, and Steven and I were always in the studio, right from the very beginning, right til the end. We would be there right alongside Jack and engineer Jay Messina. This was before automation and when we were doing mixes, everybody had to be there, turn the pan buttons and change EQ. Bring in a tambourine, hand claps, maybe a background vocal, and a rhythm guitar, popping in and out on one track. Every time you ran a mix, it was a performance."

"Sweet Emotion" features a variety of unique instrumentation. During the intro, Tyler shakes a packet of sugar in place of maracas, as none were available. He also plays the Vibraslap, which broke the third time he hit it, which can still be heard in the final recording. The introduction builds with the use of a talk box by Perry. The song begins with a repeated electric bass riff tracked alongside the bass marimba, played by engineer Jay Messina. Douglas explains, "The electric bass is doubled by a bass marimba, which is a marimba with tone bars that are so long on the low end that you have to get up on a ladder to play. Jay Messina, our engineer, also played vibes, and so I said to him, 'Why don't you double the bass line with the marimba', which is that old, wooden vibe. Boom-boom-boom da-boom-boom — it had this percussion and a tremendously low note. It actually went an octave below the electric bass, then you'd mix those two together, and that's the bass sound on that song."

Jack Douglas brought in a symphony orchestra for "You See Me Crying", which was conducted by Mike Mainieri. Production of the song took a long time to complete due to the many complex drum and guitar parts. The band's label, Columbia Records, was nonetheless very impressed with the song and the recording process. Bruce Lundvall, then-president of Columbia Records, walked in on the recording sessions for Toys in the Attic when the band was working on the song, and remarked: "You guys got an incredible thing going here. I just came from a Herbie Hancock session and this is much more fun."

During the sessions, the group would record backing tracks as instrumentals together, and then record Tyler's vocals and additional overdubs afterwards. Tom Hamilton explains, "We would record the tracks, and Steven and Joe would stay because they were doing most of the overdubs, and the rest of us had to go home to save money. And back then, the lyrics weren't written. So we knew what the tracks were going to sound like, but we wouldn't really know what the songs were going to be like until we heard the whole thing." Perry always liked to wait until Tyler recorded his vocal so he "could weave around his vocal attack," but Tyler wanted Perry to record first for the same reason. On "Walk This Way", Tyler's vocal was recorded first with Perry's guitar track overdubbed.

Perry has stated that he wanted to call the LP Rocks, which would be used for their next studio album. Tyler explains the inspiration for the album's title in his memoir: "I came up with the title because of its obvious meanings and since people thought we were fucking crazy anyway, what did it matter? This was Aerosmith's Toys in the Attic...singular, sexy, and psychosensational. The other reason I came up with Toys in the Attic was that I knew we'd made it. It's a statement of longevity. The record will be played long after you're dead. Our records would be up there in the attic, too, with the things that you loved and never wanted to forget. And to me, Aerosmith was becoming that." Drummer Kramer continues, "That's when everything started to happen, as far as being able to look at the band and say, 'Yeah, things are good now. The songs are good. The playing's good.' And it was like, you know, there was no limit to what we could do." Tom Hamilton also remembers the production favorably: "We really did put everything we had in Toys in the Attic. I guess the reason it turned out so well was because we had the perfect combination of great songs and the kind of fired-up spirit that you get after a lot of touring. We were like a well oiled machine at that time and had lots of dynamite songs that we couldn't wait to get down on tape. So no wonder the album came out sounding the way it did."

== Reception and legacy ==
Professional ratings
Review scores
Source	Rating
AllMusic	5/5 stars
Blender	5/5 stars
Christgau's Record Guide	B+
Collector's Guide to Heavy Metal	9/10
The Encyclopedia of Popular Music	4/5 stars
The Rolling Stone Album Guide	4.5/5 stars
Uncut	4/5 stars

Contemporary reviews were mixed. Rolling Stone's Gordon Fletcher compared the album unfavourably to Get Your Wings, which in his opinion, was "testimony to the band's raw abilities." He criticised Douglas's production and wrote that, despite "good moments," the band did not avoid "instances of directionless meandering and downright weak material." Robert Christgau was more positive, and remarked on the progress Aerosmith had made in a short time, musically and lyrically. Greg Kot called the album a landmark of hard rock.

Opinions have become more positive over time. AllMusic critic Stephen Thomas Erlewine remarked how Aerosmith "finally perfected their mix of Stonesy raunch and Zeppelin-esque riffing," thanks to "an increased sense of songwriting skills and purpose," creating a new style that "fully embraced sleaziness" in Tyler's lyrics, backed by "an appropriately greasy" music. In Blender, Ben Mitchell found "Aerosmith firing on all coke-clogged cylinders." He lauded all the songs in the album and called the arrangement of "You See Me Crying" "a typical ’70s rock extravagance." In 2024, Loudwire staff elected it as the best hard rock album of 1975. Canadian journalist Martin Popoff remarked the variety of styles in the album and highlighted the "memorable and ground-breaking funk metal riffs in the essential 'Walk This Way' plus the classic American swaggers of 'Sweet Emotions' and 'No More No More'".

After Toys in the Attic was released in April 1975, it eventually peaked at No. 11 on the US Billboard 200 chart, 63 positions higher than Get Your Wings. Released as a single, "Sweet Emotion" became a minor hit on the Billboard Hot 100 reaching No.36 in 1975, and "Walk This Way" reached No.10 on the Hot 100 in 1977.

The album would gain renewed attention in 1986, 11 years after its release, when hip-hop group Run-DMC covered "Walk This Way" with Aerosmith. This helped revive the latter's flagging career and helped propel rap rock to the mainstream.

== Track listing ==
Side one
No.	Title	Writer(s)	Length
1.	"Toys in the Attic"	Steven Tyler, Joe Perry	3:05
2.	"Uncle Salty"	Tyler, Tom Hamilton	4:10
3.	"Adam's Apple"	Tyler	4:34
4.	"Walk This Way"	Tyler, Perry	3:40
5.	"Big Ten Inch Record"	Fred Weismantel	2:16

Side two
No.	Title	Writer(s)	Length
1.	"Sweet Emotion"	Tyler, Hamilton	4:34
2.	"No More No More"	Tyler, Perry	4:34
3.	"Round and Round"	Tyler, Brad Whitford	5:03
4.	"You See Me Crying"	Tyler, Don Solomon	5:12

== Personnel ==
Per liner notes.

Aerosmith

- Steven Tyler – vocals, keyboards, harmonica, percussion
- Joe Perry – lead, rhythm, acoustic, and slide guitars, backing vocals, talk box, percussion
- Brad Whitford – rhythm and lead guitar
- Tom Hamilton – bass guitar, rhythm guitar on "Uncle Salty"
- Joey Kramer – drums, percussion

Additional musicians

- Scott Cushnie – piano on "Big Ten Inch Record", and "No More No More"
- Jay Messina – bass marimba on "Sweet Emotion"
- Mike Mainieri – orchestra conductor on "You See Me Crying"
- Uncredited – horn section on "Adam's Apple" and "Big Ten Inch Record"
- Dick Wagner - studio guitarist "on some Guitar solos"

Production

- Jack Douglas – producer
- Jay Messina – engineer
- Rod O'Brien, Corky Stasiak, Dave Thoener – assistant engineers
- Doug Sax – mastering
- Bob Belott – original photography
- Pacific Eye & Ear – album design
- Ingrid Haenke – illustration
- Jimmy Lenner Jr. – still life photography
- Leslie Lambert – still life collage design
- David Krebs, Steve Leber – management
- Lisa Sparagano – 1993 package design
- Ken Fredette – 1993 package design
- Vic Anesini – remastering engineer
- James Guthrie – 2003 5.1 mastering (with Doug Sax)

== Charts ==
=== Weekly charts ===
Chart (1975–1977)	Peak position
Australian Albums (Kent Music Report)	79
Canada Top Albums/CDs (RPM)	7
French Albums (SNEP)	7
US Billboard 200	11

=== Year-end charts ===
Chart (1975)	Position
US Billboard 200	31

Chart (1976)	Position
US Billboard 200	15

Chart (1977)	Position
US Billboard 200	54

== Certifications ==
Region	Certification	Certified units/sales
Australia (ARIA)	Gold	35,000^{^}
Canada (Music Canada)	Platinum	100,000^{^}
United States (RIAA)	9× Platinum	9,000,000^{‡}
^{^} Shipments figures based on certification alone.^{‡} Sales+streaming figures based on certification alone.
