= Lord of the Thighs =

Song by Aerosmith

from the album Get Your Wings
- Released: March 15, 1974
- Studio: Record Plant (New York City)
- Genre: Rock
- Length: 4:14
- Label: Columbia
- Songwriter: Steven Tyler
- Producer: Jack Douglas

"Lord of the Thighs" is a song performed by American rock band Aerosmith. It was written by frontman Steven Tyler, and released on the band's 1974 album Get Your Wings. Drummer Joey Kramer has said it is his favorite song to perform live. The song's title is a play on Lord of the Flies, a novel by William Golding. The song has remained a live staple since its release.

== Composition ==
"Thighs", as it is commonly abbreviated on setlists and elsewhere, was supposedly the last song written for Get Your Wings. The band needed one additional song for the album, so they locked themselves in Studio C at the Record Plant in New York City and came up with this song, based on the unsavory characters near their hotel on Eighth Avenue. The tongue-in-cheek lyrics are filled with double entendres and innuendo, and the song is darker than it first appears. The song is notable for the funky drum beat by Kramer. In its opening, the drum beat sounds very similar to "Walk This Way" and the song also features lead guitar work by Brad Whitford and piano playing by Steven Tyler.

== Live performances ==
The song has long been a staple in setlists at Aerosmith concerts, and was featured on the live albums Live! Bootleg and Classics Live I. It was also featured in the deep-cut collection Gems. The song was resurrected as a live staple, being played at several concerts on the Rockin' the Joint and Route of All Evil Tours in 2005 and 2006.

In concert, the band typically does an extended jam in the song, which often results in the song exceeding seven minutes in length, which prominently features Whitford on lead guitar. Tyler also introduces Whitford before he starts playing the song's riff. Joe Perry typically plays slide guitar.

== Notable cover versions ==
- The Breeders covered the song in 1993 as a b-side to Cannonball.
- Danzig covered the song on their 2015 album Skeletons.

== In other media ==
The song was featured in the Grand Theft Auto IV episodic expansion packs The Lost and Damned and The Ballad of Gay Tony on in-game radio station Liberty Rock Radio 97.8.
