= Back in the Saddle =

1977 single by Aerosmith

Single by Aerosmith

from the album Rocks
- B-side: "Nobody's Fault"
- Released: March 22, 1977
- Recorded: February–March 1976 at Wherehouse and Record Plant Studios
- Genre: Hard rock; heavy metal
- Length: 4:40
- Label: Columbia
- Songwriters: Steven Tyler; Joe Perry
- Producer: Jack Douglas

Aerosmith singles chronology
"Walk This Way" (1976)	"Back in the Saddle" (1977)	"Draw the Line" (1977)

"Back in the Saddle" is a song by American rock band Aerosmith. Written by Steven Tyler and Joe Perry, it was the first track on Aerosmith's studio album Rocks, which the band released in 1976. "Back in the Saddle" was released as the third single from the album in 1977.

It peaked at number 38 on the Billboard Hot 100. Despite being only a moderate commercial success at first, its stature grew over time to the extent that it has become one of the best known songs in the band's discography and has been a part of numerous live performances. In both lyrical and instrumental terms, "Back in the Saddle" is one of the group's most aggressive sounding releases (particularly in its openly sexual themes and forceful emotional tone) and has been compared to contemporary hard rock and heavy metal music during the late 1970s.

== Background ==
The song's main riff was written by Joe Perry on a Fender Bass VI, which gives the song its distinctive "growl" and was inspired by Perry's admiration of Peter Green of Fleetwood Mac who occasionally used a similar instrument in live performances. Brad Whitford plays the lead guitar part. "Back in the Saddle" also features a heavy distinctive bass line by Tom Hamilton. The song is notable for the slow buildup of the drum beat and guitar riff in the beginning of the song, the sound effects of a galloping horse and whips, and screams and yodeling by Steven Tyler at the end of the song.

A real bullwhip was intended to be used for the whip effects and hours were spent trying to get it to crack. The band members ended up cut and hurt without making any progress. Eventually, the band decided the whip effects would be created by whirling a 30-foot cord from the studio, then by firing a cap gun to create the crack of the whip (the sound effects are more prominent in the Quadraphonic mix of the album (Columbia CAQ 34165)). When the song is performed in concert, Tyler often makes more noticeable lyrical references to sex. Although the lyrics were written with the simple idea of cowboys and sex, this song took on new meaning after Aerosmith reunited in 1984 and embarked on their Back in the Saddle Tour.

The "saddle" Tyler refers to in the song is a metaphor for several sexual positions.

== Reception ==
Cash Box said that "many rhythmic changes, a great bass line and many devoted fans should carry this one in the same direction as 'Walk This Way'." Record World called it "a powerful follow-up to their seething 'Walk This Way.'"

== Cover versions ==
Sebastian Bach covered the song on his 2007 solo album Angel Down as a duet with Guns N' Roses frontman Axl Rose.

Mark Slaughter, Albert Lee, Rudy Sarzo and Frankie Banali covered the song for the Aerosmith tribute album Not the Same Old Song and Dance (Eagle Records, 1999). Additional guitars were by the album's producers, Bob Kulick and Bruce Bouillet.

In 2014, Aloe Blacc covered this song for the soundtrack for the film Need for Speed.

In 2025, Aerosmith collaborated with Yungblud to remix the track for the One More Time EP.

== In other media ==
- The song was used in the opening titles of NASCAR races on ESPN from 2007 to 2008.
- In February 2009, Minority Whip Eric Cantor (R-VA) used "Back in the Saddle" to boast in an ad that "The House GOP is back" after the party's unanimous opposition in the house to the American Recovery and Reinvestment Act of 2009. After Stage Three Music, which owns the rights to the song, asserted the use as copyright infringement, Cantor was forced to take down the ad. Aerosmith also did not approve of its use and also wanted it taken down.
- The song was used in the trailer as well as being prominently used in the 2010 action film Red.
- The 2025 remix of the song with Yungblud was used as one of the official theme songs for WWE's WrestleMania 42 in April 2026.

== See also ==
- 1977 in music
- Aerosmith discography
- Hard rock
