= The Train Kept A-Rollin' =

Song first recorded by Tiny Bradshaw in 1951

Single by Tiny Bradshaw
- B-side: "Knockin' Blues"
- Released: December 1951
- Recorded: October 6, 1951
- Genre: Jump blues; rhythm and blues
- Length: 2:45
- Label: King
- Songwriters: Tiny Bradshaw; Lois Mann a.k.a. Syd Nathan

"The Train Kept A-Rollin'"(or just "Train Kept A-Rollin'") is a song first recorded by American jazz and rhythm and blues musician Tiny Bradshaw in 1951. Originally performed in the style of a jump blues, Bradshaw borrowed lyrics from an earlier song and set them to an upbeat shuffle arrangement that inspired other musicians to perform and record it. Johnny Burnette and the Rock and Roll Trio made an important contribution in 1956—they reworked it as a guitar riff–driven song, which features an early use of intentionally distorted guitar in rock music.

In 1965, the Yardbirds popularized the song as an early psychedelic blues rock song, due largely to Jeff Beck's fuzz-toned guitar work. Theirs soon became the most copied arrangement with recordings by a variety of musicians. After guitarist Jimmy Page joined the group, the Yardbirds recorded an updated version with new lyrics as "Stroll On" for the film Blowup in 1966. With a highly charged rhythm section and a dual lead guitar attack by Beck and Page, it is seen as a forerunner to heavy metal music.

When the Yardbirds broke up in 1968, "Train Kept A-Rollin'" was adopted as a concert opener by Page's new band, Led Zeppelin, during its early (and again later) touring years. The song also became an important part of Aerosmith's early live repertoire, and in 1974, they recorded it for their second album. Their version is actually a two-part song—the first has a slower, groove-oriented arrangement, while the second uses that of the Yardbirds. Aerosmith turned it into a hard rock standard and a staple of classic rock radio; it remains one of their most popular tunes. "Train Kept A-Rollin'" has been performed and recorded by numerous other artists.

== Original song ==
Tiny Bradshaw and his band first recorded "The Train Kept A-Rollin'" in 1951. They performed the song as a mid-tempo jump blues, which uses a boogie-woogie bass line and a shuffle rhythm. The introductory section features scat singing by Bradshaw answered by a chorus. The verses are delivered in a lively vocal style, followed by an instrumental break with a raucous, honking-style tenor saxophone solo by Red Prysock and backed by drummer Philip Paul's heavy backbeat. Bradshaw's lyrics use early jazz hipster references:

I hopped a train I met a real dame, she was a hipster and a gone dame
She was pretty from New York City, and she trucked on down the ol' fair lane
With a heave and a ho, and I just couldn't let her go ...
The train kept a rollin' all night long, and I still wouldn't let her go

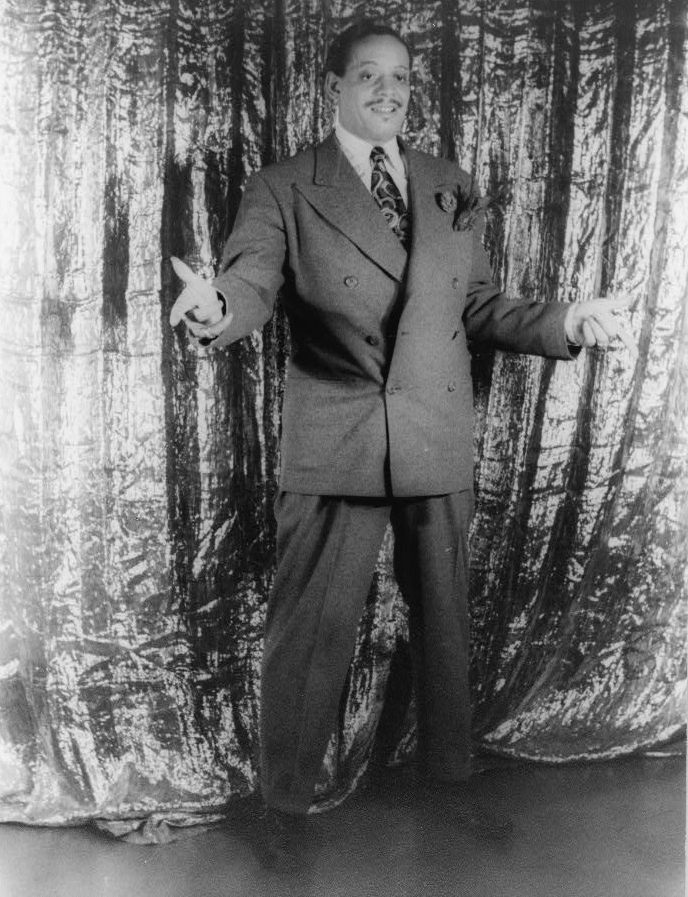
Tiny Bradshaw in 1942

The lyrics are based on "Cow-Cow Boogie", a 1942 song about a singing cowboy. Bradshaw rewrote lines, such as "a ditty he learned in the city" and "get along, get hip little doggies, and he trucked 'em on down the old fairway", to meet his new scenario. Although the King Records single lists "Bradshaw–Mann" as the songwriters, reissues and subsequent recordings of "The Train Kept A-Rollin'" credit Tiny Bradshaw, Lois Mann (a pseudonym of King Records' owner Syd Nathan), and Howard Kay. BMI, the performing rights organization, lists the songwriters/composers as "Myron C. Bradshaw, Sydney Nathan, and Howard Kay". According to music historian Larry Birnbaum, "Mann's name was plainly added to allow Syd Nathan to siphon off a share of the publishing royalties, as label owners routinely did in those days; as for Kay, his identity remains a mystery". (Note: BMI lists Howard Kay as a cowriter with Nathan/Mann and Henry Glover on four other songs.)

The recording session took place on October 6, 1951, in Cincinnati, Ohio. Besides Bradshaw, Prysock, and Paul, the other participants were Leslie Ayers and Lester Bass on trumpets, Andrew Penn on trombone, Ted "Snooky" Holbert on alto and baritone saxophone, Rufus Gore on tenor saxophone, Jimmy Robinson on piano, and Clarence Mack on bass. King Records issued the song on both ten-inch 78 rpm and seven-inch 45 rpm records in late 1951. Billboard magazine reviewed the release and commented using jump parlance: "The singer comes thru [sic] with a great vocal on a rockin' novelty, with some solid chorus and ork [orchestra a.k.a. swing band] backing. Tune builds all the way. Platter could catch a lot of change." However, it did not appear on the charts of the nation's most popular R&B songs, such as those compiled by Billboard. Although Bradshaw had five other records that reached the R&B top ten, "The Train Kept A-Rollin'" remains his best-known recording and continues to be popular with Shag dancers (a type of swing dance) on the U.S. Eastern Seaboard.

== Johnny Burnette rendition ==
"The Train Kept A-Rollin'"

Single by Johnny Burnette and the Rock and Roll Trio
- B-side: "Honey Hush"
- Released: September 1956
- Recorded: July 2, 1956
- Studio: Bradley's Barn, Nashville, Tennessee
- Genre: Rockabilly
- Length: 2:17
- Label: Coral
- Songwriters: Tiny Bradshaw, Lois Mann, Howie Kay

In 1956, Johnny Burnette and the Rock and Roll Trio reworked Bradshaw's song using a rockabilly / early rock and roll arrangement. The Trio's version features guitar lines in what many historians consider to be the first recorded example of intentionally distorted guitar in rock music, although blues guitarists, such as Willie Johnson and Pat Hare, had recorded with the same effect years earlier.

The Trio's guitarist, Paul Burlison, explained that he noticed the sound after accidentally dropping his amplifier, which dislodged a power tube and later, "whenever I wanted to get that sound, I'd just reach back and loosen that tube". He utilized this effect with the song's main instrumental feature, a three-note minor key guitar line repeated throughout. Burlison recounted how he came up with the signature guitar riff:

[I was] in the dressing room with the loose tube. Johnny [Burnett] was playing an E chord and I was playing in a G position but I'd take my fingers off and play in octaves [using the thumb and middle or index finger]. He wasn't singing "The Train Kept A-Rollin'", it was another song, and I got to doing doom diddle doom daddle doom daddle ... [Later] I told Owen Bradley about it at the Barn, where we cut the stuff, and he said, "let me hear it". So I started doing it and he said, "Well, let's do it".

The day after recording "The Train Kept A-Rollin'", the trio recorded a version of Big Joe Turner's "Honey Hush", which features a more extensive use of the riff. Coral Records released both songs on a single in September 1956.

Later, authors Vince Gordon and Peter DijkemaIt argue that the guitar sound on "The Train Kept A-Rollin'" could be created with distortion commonly achievable with a highly-overdriven early 1950s guitar amplifier. (Note: Similar "damaged amplifier" claims have been made, including by blues/R&B guitarist Willie Kizart, whose distorted guitar sound for the 1951 Jackie Brenston/Ike Turner hit "Rocket 88" also has been cited as an early example of deliberate distortion.) They point out that in the recording, the higher treble strings sound relatively clean, with the low E string having the most distortion; with a tube malfunction, all strings would be distorted more or less to an equal degree. The authors add that this difference in sound could be achieved with the pole piece for the low E string raised higher than the rest, thereby allowing it to overload the amplifier more than the treble strings. They also argue that Nashville session guitarist Grady Martin provided the guitar parts for the Trio's recording; they base this on stylistic and technical qualities, since, at the time, Martin was a more accomplished player than Burlison, and these qualities are apparent in his work on other recordings.

== The Yardbirds versions ==
"The Train Kept A-Rollin'"
- 1965 German single picture sleeve

Song by the Yardbirds

from the album Having a Rave Up
- Released: November 15, 1965
- Recorded: September 1965
- Studio: Phillips Recording, Memphis, Tennessee; Columbia 30th Street, New York City
- Genre: Rock, blues rock, psychedelic rock
- Length: 3:28
- Label: Epic
- Songwriters: Tiny Bradshaw, Howard Kay, Lois Mann
- Producer: Giorgio Gomelsky

English rock group the Yardbirds recorded "The Train Kept A-Rollin'" during their first American tour in 1965. It is based on Johnny Burnette's adaptation, but Beck biographer Annette Carson commented that their "propulsive, power-driven version, however, deviated radically from the original ... [their] recording plucked the old Rock & Roll Trio number from obscurity and turned it into a classic among classics". The Yardbirds' lead guitarist, Jeff Beck, who was a fan of early rockabilly, said that he introduced the song to the group: "They just heard me play the riff, and they loved it and made up their version of it". Giorgio Gomelsky, the group's first producer, stated that Sonny Boy Williamson II's use of blues harp to imitate train sounds during his 1963 UK tour with the Yardbirds also inspired the band's adaptation of the song. (Note: An earlier 1965 version by Screaming Lord Sutch and the Savages "has little in common with the Yardbirds' version", which lacks the Rock and Roll Trio's signature guitar riff.)

The song opens with Beck using volume swells on an overdriven guitar to simulate a train whistle and the band launches into the song with rhythm guitarist Chris Dreja, bassist Paul Samwell-Smith, and Beck following the riff from the Rock and Roll Trio's song. Two combined takes of Keith Relf's vocals, with some differences in the lyrics, come in after twelve bars. Following the vocal section, the rhythm changes to a shuffle and a 12-bar harmonica and guitar bridge sets the stage for Beck's first solo. After returning to the original rhythm for another double-tracked vocal section, a brief "rave up"-style section precedes Beck's second solo. A rave up is used to describe a middle instrumental section of a song, when the beat shifts into double-time and the instrumental improvisation gradually builds to a climax. It was part of the Yardbirds' signature sound (Note: The middle sections of the Yardbirds' hits "For Your Love", "I'm a Man", and "Shapes of Things" also feature brief "rave ups".) and "represent[s] some of the earliest psychedelic blues-rock, antedating Jimi Hendrix and Cream", according to Birnbaum. Beck's second guitar solo, which extends for two 12-bar sections, features an early use of a fuzz-tone distortion effects pedal. Birnbaum describes his work as "incendiary" and "riveting, relatively complex solos". The Yardbirds' rendition became the new standard that subsequent musicians would follow.

The song was recorded by Sam Phillips at his Phillips Recording studio in Memphis, Tennessee, on September 12, 1965, with further recording by Roy Halee at Columbia Recording Studio in New York City on September 21 and 22, 1965. (Note: Unlike other accounts, Gomelsky stated that the song was recorded entirely at CBS in New York.) "The Train Kept A-Rollin'" was included on studio side of the Yardbirds' second American album Having a Rave Up, which was issued on November 15, 1965. The song, along with another American studio recording, "I'm a Man", was not released in the UK until the mid-1970s, well after the group had disbanded. The song was a staple of the band's concerts and they recorded several live versions with Beck, which appear on albums such as BBC Sessions (1991) and Glimpses 1963–1968 (2011).

In June 1966, bassist Samwell-Smith left the Yardbirds to become a record producer. His initial replacement, well-known studio guitarist Jimmy Page, soon switched to guitar with second guitarist Dreja taking over on bass. With both Beck and Page on board, the Yardbirds had one of the first dual lead guitar teams in popular rock. Movie director Michelangelo Antonioni saw the group's September 23, 1966, performance at the Royal Albert Hall in London and, being impressed with their version of the song, requested that they perform "Train Kept A-Rollin'" for his upcoming film, Blowup. Less than two weeks later, the group entered the Sound Techniques studios in London, where they recorded on October 3–5, 1966. Unable to secure the movie performance rights from the song's publisher, singer Keith Relf wrote new lyrics, renamed it "Stroll On", and included credits to the five band members. The Yardbirds also introduced an updated arrangement to go with the new lyrics. Led Zeppelin biographer Keith Shadwick describes the new version as "brutal, menacing, and teetering on all-out violence", which foreshadows heavy-metal. It opens with a new drum part by Jim McCarty and harmonized guitar feedback, before Beck's train whistle simulation. Unlike their earlier song, Relf's vocal is not double tracked nor does he play harmonica and the rhythm remains on the riff throughout the song. The guitar work, with both Beck and Page contributing lead-guitar parts, (Note: Relf stated that Dreja was the second guitarist on "Stroll On", although Dreja has not confirmed this. The Yardbirds were filmed earlier performing the song when Page was still on bass and Dreja on rhythm guitar.) has been called "revolutionary", from the opening "wall of feedback", the use of "jarringly dissonant chords", and the "twining guitar duet" by Birnbaum. (Note: Birnbaum also writes "the twin guitar part owes a lot to Chuck Berry", although his early 1960s recordings with Matt Murphy use the conventional rhythm/lead guitar distinction rather than dual leads.) During October 12–14, the Yardbirds were filmed lip syncing the song for Blowup. Their scene was staged on a set at Elstree Studios designed to resemble the Ricky-Tick, a popular London club and, at Antonioni's direction, Beck smashes his guitar, in the manner of the Who's Pete Townshend. (Note: Antonioni reportedly originally wanted the Who to perform their auto-destructive act for Blowup, but was unable to contact them.) (Note: In a July 8, 1967, review of the Monterey Pop Festival for Billboard magazine, Philip Elwood noted the Who's performance "ended with a guitar-smashing of their own, quite similar to the Yardbirds' bit in Blow Up.") The song as performed in the film is edited (doubled) to increase its length for the story line. "Stroll On" was later included on the Blow-Up soundtrack album (1967) and appears on the Yardbirds compilation albums Train Kept A-Rollin'/The Yardbirds Story (1993) and Ultimate! (2001).

After Jeff Beck's departure in late 1966, the Yardbirds continued to regularly perform "The Train Kept A-Rollin'". The original lyrics were used, but the "Stroll On" arrangement was followed with Jimmy Page playing all the guitar parts. Live performances with Page were later released on Live Yardbirds: Featuring Jimmy Page (1971), Last Rave-Up in L.A. (1979), Glimpses 1963–1968 (2011), and Yardbirds '68 (2017). (Note: In 1968, the Scotty McKay Quintet recorded a hard rock version based on "Stroll On". McKay claims that Jimmy Page overdubbed the guitar solo for the recording, while regular Quintet guitarist Bobby Rambo and Blair Smith with the Exotics have also taken credit for the solo.)

== Led Zeppelin performances ==
Shortly after Keith Relf and Jim McCarty left the Yardbirds in mid-1968, Jimmy Page searched for new musicians for a successor band. When the future members of Led Zeppelin rehearsed together for the first time in 1968, the first song they played was "Train Kept A-Rollin'". In When Giants Walked the Earth, biographer Mick Wall quotes Page:

[W]e did 'Train' ... It was there immediately. It was so powerful that I don't remember what we played after that. For me it was just like, 'Crikey!' I mean, I'd had moments of elation with groups before, but nothing as intense as that. It was like a thunderbolt, a lightning flash – boosh! Everyone sort of went 'Wow'.

The song was included in their early performances as "the New Yardbirds" and was featured as their opening number in Led Zeppelin's 1968 and 1969 tours, and was included on several bootleg albums. In an interview, early MTV video host J. J. Jackson, who pointed out that he does not characterize Led Zeppelin's music as heavy metal, described a bootleg recording from their first American tour, "if this were the only recording somebody ever heard of them, it doesn't get much more 'heavy metal' sounding than this, does it?" They later revived it for their final tour "Over Europe" in 1980. Though a studio version was never recorded by Led Zeppelin, as a solo artist Page recorded, during his Outrider sessions in 1988, a version similar to the Led Zeppelin 1980 version.

== Aerosmith version ==
"Train Kept A Rollin'"
- Columbia single edit label

Song by Aerosmith

from the album Get Your Wings
- Released: March 1974 (album); October 1974 (single)
- Recorded: December 17, 1973 – January 14, 1974
- Studio: Record Plant, New York City
- Genre: Hard rock
- Length: 5:33 (album); 3:15 (single edit)
- Label: Columbia
- Songwriters: Tiny Bradshaw, Lois Mann, Howard Kay
- Producer: Jack Douglas

In 1974, Aerosmith brought "Train Kept A-Rollin'" into the hard-rock mainstream. Steven Tyler, Joe Perry, and Tom Hamilton had performed the song prior to joining Aerosmith. Perry recalled, "'Train Kept A-Rollin'' was the only song we had in common when we first got together. Steven's band had played 'Train' and Tom and I played it in our band ... It's a blues song, if you follow its roots all the way back ... I always thought if I could just play one song, it would be that one because of what it does to me". Perry's band began performing the song regularly after he had been moved by the performance of "Stroll On" in Blowup; Tyler recalled his band opened for the Yardbirds in 1966:

I had seen the Yardbirds play somewhere the previous summer with both Jeff Beck and Jimmy Page in the band ... In Westport [at their supporting gig on October 22, 1966] we found out that Jeff had left the band and Jimmy was playing lead guitar by himself. I watched him from the edge of the stage and all I can say is that he knocked my tits off. They did "Train Kept A-Rollin'" and it was just so heavy. They were just an un-fuckin'-believable band.

The song was an early feature of Aerosmith's concerts and a frequent show closer, including for their first gig in 1970. They wanted to record a live version of the song, but producer Jack Douglas persuaded them to record a studio version, which actually consisted of two different versions of the song. The first part was slower, "more groove-oriented", while the second was a spirited rocker. To give the second part more of a live sound, Douglas overdubbed crowd noise from The Concert for Bangladesh, the 1971 benefit organized by George Harrison. Steve Hunter and Dick Wagner, who worked with Lou Reed and Alice Cooper, were brought in to record the guitar parts. According to Hunter, "We [Wagner and I] wanted to keep the solos equal so we'd sit down ... and go through the material so it was totally even ... We didn't want it to look like there was a rhythm guitar player and a lead guitar player, because that's what we both did". Hunter later elaborated:

Aerosmith was in Studio C of The Record Plant and I was doing work with Bob Ezrin in Studio A. I had a long wait between dubs and was waiting in the lobby. Jack Douglas popped his head out of Studio C and asked "Hey, do you feel like playing?" I said sure, so I grabbed my guitar and went in ... I had two run thru's, then Jack said "great that's it!" That turned out to be the opening solos on "Train Kept A Rollin'".

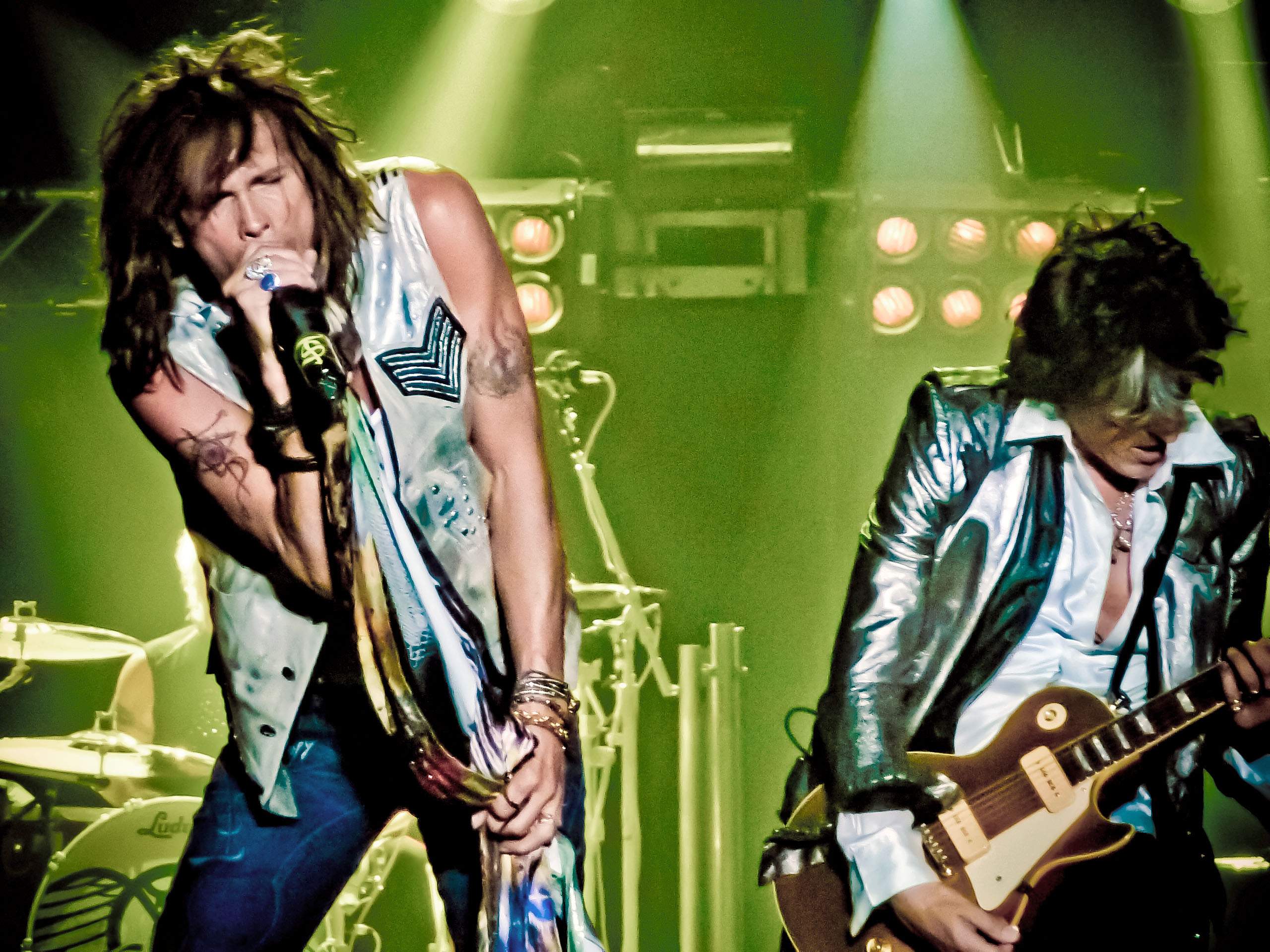
Steve Tyler and Joe Perry at a 2010 Aerosmith concert

In 1974, "Train Kept A-Rollin'" was included on Aerosmith's second album Get Your Wings. A 3:15 edited version of the song without the added audience noises was released as a single, but it did not appear on the record charts. The song continues to be a highlight of the group's shows and the album version has become a staple of album-oriented rock and classic rock radio. It has become so identified with Aerosmith, that when Jeff Beck (whose 1965 and 1966 recordings with the Yardbirds inspired Tyler and Perry) occasionally performed it, he often heard comments like "Hey, I like your angle on the Aerosmith tune".

The song is featured on three Aerosmith live compilations: Live! Bootleg (1978), Classics Live (1986), and Rockin' the Joint (2005). On the Rockin' the Joint version, Perry and Brad Whitford can be heard doing a little bit of "The Star-Spangled Banner" towards the end. Additionally, the band is known to play two different versions of the song, the regular version of the song, as well as a slowed-down version often called "Slow Train" in the setlists. On at least two occasions, Tyler and Perry have performed the song with other artists; in 1992 with Guns N' Roses and in 1995 with Page and Plant. In 2002, the whole band performed the song live with the Japanese hard rock duo B'z. It also appears in the music video game Rock Band, and the master track appears in Guitar Hero: Aerosmith as the final encore in the game. In 2012, Aerosmith performed the song with Johnny Depp, which is included as an extra track on the Music from Another Dimension! DVD.

== Recognition and legacy ==
The Johnny Burnette Rock and Roll Trio rendition of "Train Kept A-Rollin'" is included in the Rock and Roll Hall of Fame's exhibit of the "500 Songs that Shaped Rock and Roll". Birnbaum sums up the various influences and versions:

As it evolved from ragtime through jazz, boogie-woogie, big-band swing, small combo rhythm-and-blues, rockabilly, blues-rock, acid rock, heavy metal, punk, thrash, psychobilly, and points beyond, "Train Kept A-Rollin'" became increasingly wild and dissonant, as if each performer were trying to surpass the intensity of the previous one. Through all the transformations, the essence of Bradshaw's original survives — a semblance of the melody, a smattering of the lyrics, and the immortal refrain "The train kept a rollin' all night long", a cogent sexual metaphor for power and endurance.

== Notes ==
Footnotes

Citations

References

- Birnbaum, Larry (2012). Before Elvis: The Prehistory of Rock 'n' Roll. Lanham, Massachusetts: Scarecrow Press. ISBN 978-0-8108-8629-2.
- Carson, Annette (2001). Jeff Beck: Crazy Fingers. San Francisco: Backbeat Books. ISBN 0-87930-632-7.
- Clayson, Alan (2002). The Yardbirds. San Francisco: Backbeat Books. ISBN 0-87930-724-2.
- Davis, Stephen (2003). Walk This Way: The Autobiography of Aerosmith. New York City: It Books. ISBN 978-0-06-051580-5.
- Escott, Colin (1990). Junior Parker, James Cotton, Pat Hare: Mystery Train (CD notes). Junior Parker, James Cotton, Pat Hare. Cambridge, Massachusetts: Rounder Records. CD SS 38.
- Elwood, Phillip (July 8, 1967). "Fest a California 'Dream-In'". Billboard. Vol. 79, no. 27. ISSN 0006-2510.
- Forte, Dan (1991). Guitar Player Presents Legends of the Guitar – Rock: The '50s, Vol. 2 (CD notes). Various artists. Santa Monica, California: Rhino Records. R2 70561.
- Gomelsky, Giorgio; Cohen, Phil (2002). The Yardbirds Story (Box set booklet). The Yardbirds. Charly Records. SNAD 905 CD.
- Gordon, Vince; Dijkema, Peter (2011). Rockabilly: The Twang Heard 'Round the World: The Illustrated History. Voyageur Press. ISBN 978-0-7603-4062-2.
- Grendysa, Peter (1992). Blues Masters, Volume 5: Jump Blues Classics (CD booklet). Various artists. Santa Monica, California: Rhino Records. R2 71125.
- Jeansonne, Glen; Luhrssen, David; Sokolovic, Dan (2011). Elvis Presley, Reluctant Rebel: His Life and Our Times. Santa Barbara, California: ABC-CLIO. ISBN 978-0313359040.
- Koda, Cub; Russo, Gregg (2001). Ultimate! (CD booklet). The Yardbirds. Rhino Records. R2 79825.
- Lewis, Dan; Pallett, Simon (2005). Led Zeppelin: The Concert File. London: Omnibus Press. ISBN 1-84449-659-7.
- Menn, Don (1992). Secrets from the Masters: Conversations with Forty Great Guitar Players from the pages of Guitar Player magazine. San Francisco: Miller Freeman. ISBN 978-0585358505.
- Morris, Chris (1991). Howlin' Wolf: The Chess Box (Box set booklet). Howlin' Wolf. Universal City, California: MCA Records/Chess Records. CHD39332.
- Palmer, Robert (1981). Deep Blues. New York City: Penguin Books. ISBN 0-14-006223-8.
- Reddon, Frank (2012). J. J. Jackson Remembers Led Zeppelin: The Music and The Guys Who Made It. Enzepplopedia Publishing.
- Russo, Greg (1998). Yardbirds: The Ultimate Rave-Up. Floral Park, New York: Crossfire Publications. ISBN 0-9648157-3-7.
- Shadwick, Keith (2005). Led Zeppelin: The Story of a Band and Their Music 1968–1980 (1st ed.). San Francisco: Backbeat Books. ISBN 0-87930-871-0.
- Wall, Mick (2010). When Giants Walked the Earth: A Biography of Led Zeppelin. New York City: St. Martin's Griffin. ISBN 978-0-312-59039-0.
- Whitburn, Joel (1988). Top R&B Singles 1942–1988. Menomonee Falls, Wisconsin: Record Research. ISBN 0-89820-068-7.
