= Brad Whitford =

American guitarist (born 1952)

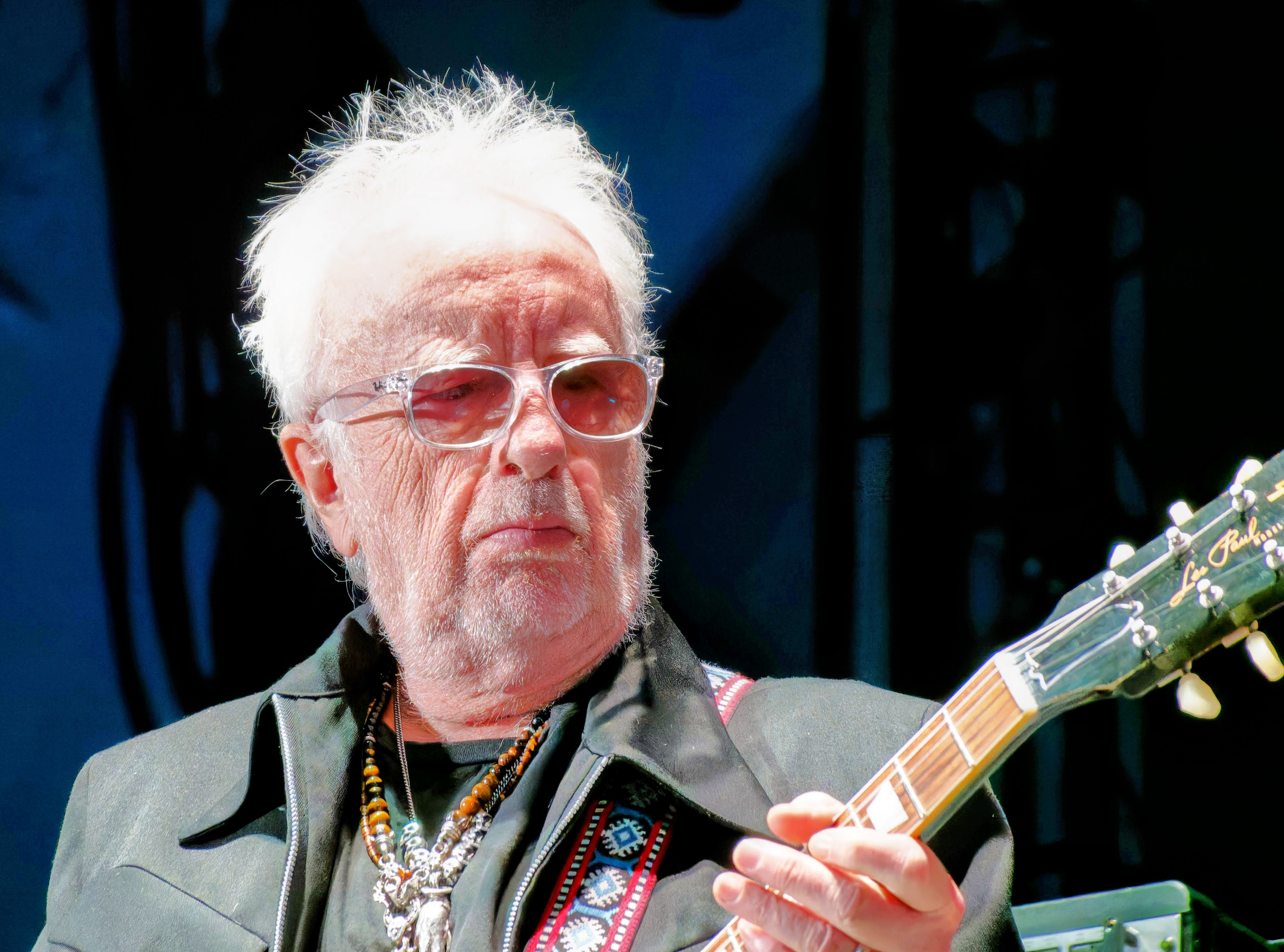
- Whitford performing in 2025

Background information
- Born: Bradley Ernest Whitford; February 23, 1952 (age 74); Winchester, Massachusetts, U.S.
- Genres: Hard rock; blues rock; rock and roll; glam metal; heavy metal
- Occupations: Musician; songwriter
- Instruments: Guitar; bass; vocals
- Years active: 1965–present
- Member of: Aerosmith, The Joe Perry Project
- Formerly of: Experience Hendrix, Whitford/St. Holmes
- Website: aerosmith.com

Bradley Ernest Whitford (born February 23, 1952) is an American musician who is best known as a guitarist for the hard rock band Aerosmith for which he was inducted into the Rock and Roll Hall of Fame in 2001. He has also worked as a songwriter for the group, co-composing well-received tracks such as 1976's "Last Child".

== Early life and education ==
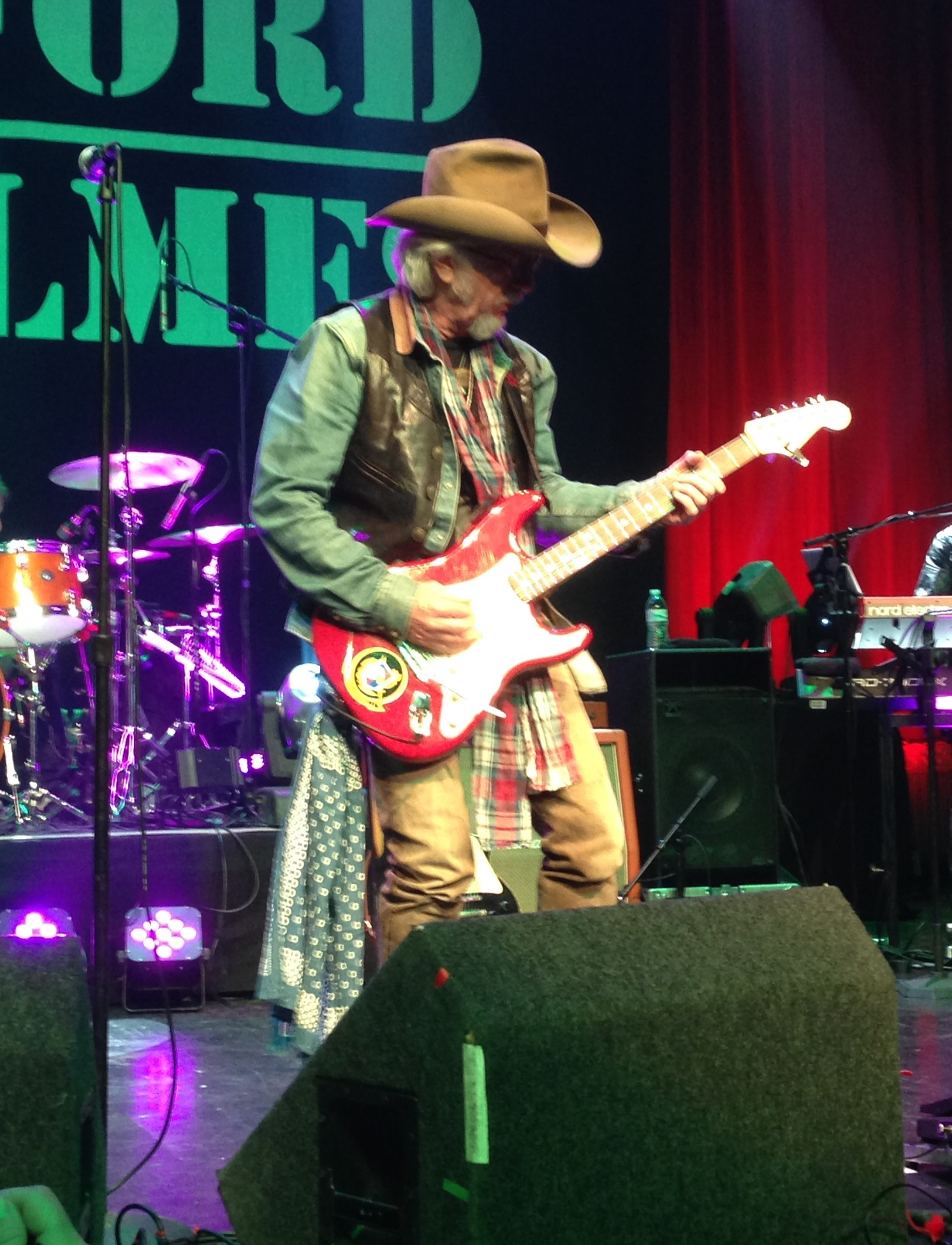
Whitford performing with Whitford/St. Holmes in St. Charles, Illinois, November 13, 2015

Whitford graduated from Reading Memorial High School in Reading, Massachusetts in 1970. He then attended the Berklee College of Music.

== Career ==
=== 20th century ===
Whitford played as lead guitarist in forming local bands Cymbals of Resistance (1965–1968), Teapot Dome, Earth, Inc. (1968–1970) as bassist, and Justin Thyme (1970–1971) as guitarist before joining Aerosmith in 1971, where he replaced original guitarist Ray Tabano. Aerosmith went on to be one of the most successful bands of the 1970s. Following several less successful albums in the late 1970s, however, Whitford left Aerosmith in 1981 to work on his own project with singer Derek St. Holmes, called Whitford/St. Holmes. The project was dissolved after a sole self-titled album was released in 1981, although Whitford/St. Holmes reunited for 2015 and 2016 tours and released another album, Reunion.

Whitford briefly toured with Joe Perry Project, featuring former Aerosmith bandmate Joe Perry, before both Perry and Whitford rejoined Aerosmith in 1984. In the mid-late 1980s, all band members completed drug rehabilitation, including Whitford, who completed programs to combat his alcohol abuse. Whitford remains sober to this day and continues to be an active member in Aerosmith.

Whitford also served as a producer for the Neighborhoods, a Boston band that was led by David Minehan, a rabid Aerosmith fan. In 1994, a family illness forced Whitford to leave unexpectedly in the middle of a tour of Asia, and Minehan flew to Japan, where he performed in Whitford's place for several days until Whitford returned.

=== 21st century ===
In 2007, along with fellow Aerosmith guitarist Joe Perry, Whitford was included in the Guitar World book The 100 Greatest Guitarists of All Time.

Whitford missed the start of Aerosmith's 2009 summer tour after requiring surgery as a result of a head injury sustained while getting out of his Ferrari. He joined the tour a month later.

In 2010, Whitford was announced as one of the guitarists to take part in the Experience Hendrix tour, playing songs performed and inspired by Jimi Hendrix with Joe Satriani, Jonny Lang, Eric Johnson, Kenny Wayne Shepherd, Ernie Isley, Living Colour, Hubert Sumlin, bassist Billy Cox, and others.

In 2025, Whitford joined The Joe Perry Project again for a short tour in August and September.

== Musical contributions and style ==
While Joe Perry is Aerosmith's better known guitarist and the band's principal songwriter with Steven Tyler, Whitford has made significant contributions to the band's repertoire over the years. This includes co-writing Aerosmith's hit "Last Child" as well as some of Aerosmith's heaviest songs: "Nobody's Fault" and "Round and Round", and playing lead guitar on "Sick as a Dog" and "Back In the Saddle" (on which Perry plays six string bass), "Last Child", and on the ballads "You See Me Crying" and "Home Tonight", "Lord of the Thighs" and "Love in an Elevator". The version of "Lord of the Thighs" on their 1978 live album Live! Bootleg in particular is perhaps his most famous soloing moment. When Aerosmith made their comeback in the late 1980s, Whitford continued to co-write tracks such as "Permanent Vacation" and "Hoodoo/Voodoo Medicine Man", and plays occasional lead guitar on some more recent tracks as well as during many live performances.

Concerning his lesser role in the band's songwriting process, Whitford has said, "I don't consider myself a terribly prolific writer. I can write music with other people if they're better songwriters than I am. I really can't create a song. It's very difficult to do. That's why the people that can do it are very few and far between. I'm certainly not that type of a guy. More of a guitar player, more of the kind of [guy] who comes up with enough riffs and ideas to write a song. But to write lyrics and come up with a melody for it, it won't happen."

Said Aerosmith lead singer Steven Tyler of the two guitarists, "Joe is self-taught and his playing comes from raw emotion. Not that Brad's doesn't, but his style is more schooled."

Slash, lead guitarist of Guns N' Roses cites Whitford as one of his heaviest influences, stating: "I identified with Joe Perry's image, both soundwise and visually....but I was also totally into Brad Whitford's guitar solos, and he had a more direct influence on the way I play than anybody realizes."

== Aerosmith ==
=== Guitarist ===
Whitford plays lead guitar, co-leads, or guitar solo on the following Aerosmith songs:

1. "Make It" from (co-lead) Aerosmith
2. "One Way Street" (co-lead, first guitar solo) from Aerosmith
3. "Lord of the Thighs" (lead) from Get Your Wings
4. "Spaced" from (co-lead) Get Your Wings
5. "S.O.S. (Too Bad)" from Get Your Wings
6. "Seasons of Wither" (co-lead, second guitar solo) from Get Your Wings
7. "Round and Round" from Toys in the Attic
8. "You See Me Crying" (co-lead, first and outro solo) from Toys in the Attic
9. "Back in the Saddle" (co-lead) from Rocks
10. "Last Child" from Rocks
11. "Sick as a Dog" (co-lead, first guitar solo) from Rocks
12. "Nobody's Fault" from Rocks
13. "Home Tonight" (co-lead, first solo) from Rocks
14. "I Wanna Know Why" from Draw the Line
15. "Kings and Queens" from Draw the Line
16. "The Hand that Feeds" from Draw the Line
17. "Milk Cow Blues" (co-lead and first guitar solo) from Draw the Line
18. "No Surprize" (co-lead) from Night in the Ruts
19. "Remember (Walking in the Sand)" (co-lead) from Night in the Ruts
20. "Mia" (co-lead) from Night in the Ruts
21. "Shela" (co-lead) from Done with Mirrors
22. "Gypsy Boots" (co-lead) from Done with Mirrors
23. "She's on Fire" (co-lead) from Done with Mirrors
24. "The Hop" (co-lead) from Done with Mirrors
25. "Hearts Done Time" (co-lead) from Permanent Vacation
26. "Dude (Looks Like a Lady)" (co-lead, second guitar solo) from Permanent Vacation
27. "Girl Keeps Coming Apart" from Permanent Vacation
28. "Permanent Vacation" from Permanent Vacation
29. "The Movie" from Permanent Vacation
30. "Love in an Elevator" (co-lead) from Pump
31. "Hoodoo/Voodoo Medicine Man" from Pump
32. "Krawhitham" from Pandora's Box
33. "Fever" from Get a Grip
34. "Flesh" (co-lead, first guitar solo) from Get a Grip
35. "Gotta Love It" (co-lead, first guitar solo) from Get a Grip
36. "Can't Stop Messin'" (co-lead, second guitar solo)) from "Livin' on the Edge" single
37. "Nine Lives" from Nine Lives
38. "Ain't That a Bitch" from Nine Lives
39. "Crash" (co-lead) from Nine Lives
40. "Road Runner" (co-lead) from Honkin' on Bobo
41. "You Gotta Move" (co-lead) from Honkin' on Bobo
42. "I'm Ready" (co-lead, first guitar solo) from Honkin' on Bobo
43. "Stop Messin' Around" (co-lead, first guitar solo) from Honkin' on Bobo
44. "Beautiful" from Music from Another Dimension!
45. "Tell Me" from Music from Another Dimension!
46. "Street Jesus" (co-lead, first guitar solo) from Music from Another Dimension!
47. "Can't Stop Lovin' You" from Music from Another Dimension!

=== Aerosmith songs ===
Whitford is credited with co-writing the following Aerosmith songs:

1. "Round and Round" from Toys in the Attic
2. "Last Child" from Rocks
3. "Nobody's Fault" from Rocks
4. "Kings and Queens" from Draw the Line
5. "The Hand That Feeds" from Draw the Line
6. "Shela" from Done with Mirrors
7. "The Hop" from Done with Mirrors
8. "Permanent Vacation" from Permanent Vacation
9. "The Movie" from Permanent Vacation
10. "Hoodoo/ Voodoo Medicine Man" from Pump
11. "Krawhitham" from Pandora's Box
12. "Soul Saver" from Pandora's Box
13. "Circle Jerk" from Pandora's Box
14. "Beautiful" from Music from Another Dimension!
15. "Street Jesus" from Music from Another Dimension!
16. "Lover Alot" from Music from Another Dimension!
17. "Can't Stop Lovin' You" from Music from Another Dimension!

== Equipment ==
At current performances, Whitford can be seen playing a wide array of solid-body guitars, some including Floyd Rose locking tremolos: Gretschs, several Floyd Rose Discovery Series guitars, a Shoreline Gold painted (Stratocaster style) Melancon Pro Artist, a Gibson Les Paul Goldtop along with a wide variety of Fender Stratocasters. Whitford continues to tour primarily with vintage Fender Stratocasters and Gibson Les Pauls for Aerosmith concerts as well as smaller gigs.

Meanwhile, Aerosmith's original heyday in the late 1970s saw both Whitford and co-guitarist Joe Perry arm themselves with aggressive-looking guitars from BC Rich (Whitford favored an unpainted BC Rich Eagle, while Perry often played an alien-looking red BC Rich Bich).

On the amplifier front, Whitford has created his own amplifier company – 3 Monkeys Amplification and tours with many of their products. Furthermore, he also uses Paul Reed Smith amps. Additionally, Whitford has used a myriad of pedals throughout his career including many boutique ones.

== Guest appearances ==
- Whitford appears in Guitar Hero: Aerosmith as the guitarist. He is also a playable character.
- In 2011 Whitford made a guest appearance on A&Es Storage Wars episode "Hang 'Em High Desert" along with collector Barry Weiss appraising two vintage guitars and an amp
- In 2012 Whitford contributed to Joe Bonamassa's album Driving Towards the Daylight on several tracks.
- In 2019, Whitford made an appearance, along with his son Graham, in an episode of American Pickers where Mike and Frank find the original Aerosmith van (Season 20, episode 8)
