= Greatest Hits (Aerosmith album) =

Greatest hits album by Aerosmith
- Released: November 11, 1980
- Recorded: 1972 at Intermedia Studios, Boston, Massachusetts; 1973–1977 and 1979 at Record Plant Studios, New York City, New York; February–March 1976 and August 1978 at the Wherehouse, Waltham, Massachusetts; June–October 1977 at the Cenacle, Armonk, New York; 1979 at Mediasound, New York City, New York
- Genre: Hard rock, blues rock
- Length: 37:15
- Label: Columbia
- Producer: Adrian Barber, Jack Douglas, Ray Colcord, Aerosmith, George Martin, Gary Lyons

Aerosmith compilation chronology
Greatest Hits (1980)	Gems (1988)

Greatest Hits 1973–1988
- Album art of 1997 revised version

Greatest Hits, later re-released as Greatest Hits 1973–1988, is the first greatest hits compilation album by American hard rock band Aerosmith, released by Columbia Records on November 11, 1980.

== Release and reception ==
Professional ratings
Review scores
Source	Rating
AllMusic	5/5 stars
Christgau's Record Guide	A−
Collector's Guide to Heavy Metal	6/10
The Encyclopedia of Popular Music	4/5 stars
The Great Rock Discography	9/10

Although the official website for Aerosmith lists the release for Greatest Hits as October 1980, and the album was originally scheduled for release on October 24, 1980, it was delayed until November 11, 1980.

Some of the tracks were significantly edited from their original versions. The single version of "Same Old Song and Dance" was used, and was edited down almost a full minute. It also contained an alternate lyric which was not heard on Get Your Wings. The original lyric was "Gotcha with the cocaine, found with your gun." The alternate lyric, included on the compilation, was "You shady lookin' loser, you played with my gun." "Sweet Emotion" also used the single version; it begins with the first chorus, cutting out the now famous talk box intro and the coda was replaced with a repeating chorus and fades out. "Kings and Queens" was also edited down, cutting the intro and certain other parts. "Walk This Way" was edited slightly, chanting the first chorus once instead of twice. The other remaining tracks were kept intact.

On April 21, 1997, a slightly revised version, Greatest Hits 1973–1988, was released outside the US, with the ten tracks in their edited versions retained, with five additional songs from the same era added, plus the 1991 version of "Sweet Emotion" and a live version of "One Way Street".

Greatest Hits is the band's highest RIAA certified album in the United States, having been certified 12× Platinum in 2021.

== Track listing ==
=== Original version ===
Side one
No.	Title	Writer(s)	Producer(s)	Length
1.	"Dream On" (from Aerosmith, 1973)	Steven Tyler	Adrian Barber	4:24
2.	"Same Old Song and Dance" (Single version) (from Get Your Wings, 1974)	Tyler, Joe Perry	Jack Douglas, Ray Colcord	3:02
3.	"Sweet Emotion" (Single version) (from Toys in the Attic, 1975)	Tyler, Tom Hamilton	Douglas	3:12
4.	"Walk This Way" (Slightly edited version) (from Toys in the Attic)	Tyler, Perry	Douglas	3:30
5.	"Last Child" (from Rocks, 1976)	Tyler, Brad Whitford	Douglas, Aerosmith	3:26

Side two
No.	Title	Writer(s)	Producer(s)	Length
1.	"Back in the Saddle" (from Rocks)	Tyler, Perry	Douglas, Aerosmith	4:39
2.	"Draw the Line" (from Draw the Line, 1977)	Tyler, Perry	Douglas, Aerosmith	3:21
3.	"Kings and Queens" (Single version) (from Draw the Line)	Tyler, Whitford, Hamilton, Joey Kramer, Jack Douglas	Douglas, Aerosmith	3:46
4.	"Come Together" (from Sgt. Pepper's Lonely Hearts Club Band: The Original Soundtrack, 1978)	John Lennon, Paul McCartney	Douglas, George Martin	3:44
5.	"Remember (Walking in the Sand)" (from Night in the Ruts, 1979)	George Morton	Gary Lyons, Aerosmith	4:03
Total length:				37:32

=== 1997 reissue ===
Track details same as original version track listing, except where noted.

No.	Title	Writer(s)	Producer(s)	Length
1.	"Dream On"			4:26
2.	"Mama Kin" (from Aerosmith)	Tyler	Barber	4:27
3.	"Same Old Song and Dance"			3:03
4.	"Seasons of Wither" (from Get Your Wings)	Tyler	Douglas, Colcord	4:57
5.	"Sweet Emotion"			3:13
6.	"Walk This Way"			3:32
7.	"Big Ten Inch Record" (from Toys in the Attic)	Fred Weismantel	Douglas	2:15
8.	"Last Child"			3:27
9.	"Back in the Saddle"			4:41
10.	"Draw the Line"			3:23
11.	"Kings and Queens"			3:49
12.	"Come Together"	Lennon–McCartney		3:45
13.	"Remember (Walking in the Sand)"			4:05
14.	"Lightning Strikes" (from Rock in a Hard Place, 1982)	Richard Supa	Lyons, Aerosmith	4:28
15.	"Chip Away the Stone" (from Gems, 1988)	Supa	Douglas	4:01
16.	"Sweet Emotion" (David Thoener remix - from Pandora's Box Single, 1991; original version from Toys in the Attic)	Tyler, Hamilton	Douglas	4:36
17.	"One Way Street" (Live) (from Made in America, 1997/2001; original version from Aerosmith)	Tyler		6:40
Total length:				68:40

== Personnel ==
Aerosmith

- Steven Tyler – lead vocals, harmonica, percussion, producer, arrangement
- Joe Perry – lead guitar, rhythm guitar, backing vocals, arrangement, except on "Lightning Strikes"
- Brad Whitford – rhythm and lead guitar, producer, arrangement
- Tom Hamilton – bass guitar, producer, arrangement
- Joey Kramer – drums, producer, arrangement

Additional musicians

- Jimmy Crespo – lead guitar, backing vocals on "Lightning Strikes"
- Michael Brecker – tenor saxophone on "Same Old Song and Dance" and "Big Ten Inch Record"
- Randy Brecker – trumpet on "Same Old Song and Dance"
- Stan Bronstein – baritone saxophone on "Same Old Song and Dance"
- Jon Pearson – trombone on "Same Old Song and Dance"
- David Woodford – saxophone on "Mama Kin"
- Scott Cushnie – keyboards, piano on "Big Ten Inch Record"
- Jay Messina – bass marimba on "Sweet Emotion"

Production

- Jack Douglas – producer, arrangement
- Adrian Barber – producer
- George Martin – producer
- Ray Colcord – producer
- Jay Messina – engineer
- Vic Anesini – remastering
- Janet Perr – cover concept
- John Berg – design

== Charts ==
=== Weekly charts ===
Weekly chart performance for Greatest Hits
Chart (1980–2020)	Peak position
US Billboard 200	43
US Top Rock Albums (Billboard)	30

=== Year-end charts ===
2019 year-end chart performance for Greatest Hits
Chart (2019)	Position
US Top Rock Albums (Billboard)	63

2020 year-end chart performance for Greatest Hits
Chart (2020)	Position
US Top Rock Albums (Billboard)	41

2021 year-end chart performance for Greatest Hits
Chart (2021)	Position
US Top Rock Albums (Billboard)	44

2024 year-end chart performance for Greatest Hits
Chart (2024)	Position
US Billboard 200	129

== Certifications ==
Certifications for Greatest Hits
Region	Certification	Certified units/sales
Canada (Music Canada)	Platinum	100,000^{^}
Japan (RIAJ) 1997 reissue	Gold	100,000^{^}
United Kingdom (BPI) original release	Gold	100,000^{^}
United Kingdom (BPI) 1997 reissue	Silver	60,000^{‡}
United States (RIAA)	12× Platinum	12,000,000^{‡}
^{^} Shipments figures based on certification alone.^{‡} Sales+streaming figures based on certification alone.

== Release history ==
Release history and formats for Greatest Hits
Region	Date	Format	Tracks	Label	Catalog #	Barcode	Edition	Series	Notes
US	Nov 11, 1980	LP	10	Columbia/CBS	FC 36865	074643686518	—	—	Some front covers have the right side of the logo, others the left side
US	Nov 11, 1980	Cassette	10	Columbia/CBS	FCT 36865	074643686549	—	—	Some issues have the “0 7464-36865-1” LP barcode
US	Nov 11, 1980	8-Track	11	Columbia/CBS	FCA 36865	074643686587	—	—	Grey Shell; "Walk This Way" is listed twice
US	Jul 1983	LP	10	Columbia/CBS	PC 36865	074643686518	—	The Nice Price	
US	Jul 1983	Cassette	10	Columbia/CBS	PCT 36865	074643686549	—	The Nice Price	
US	May 1986	CD	10	Columbia/CBS	CK 36865	074643686525	—	—	Longbox; sched. for Dec 1984 - delayed 17 months
US	Aug 30, 1988	CD	10	Columbia/CBS	CK 36865	074643686525	—	Best Value Series	Longbox
US	Jan 1989	LP	10	Columbia/CBS	FC 36865	074643686518 01	—	Chart Busters	
US	Jan 1989	Cassette	10	Columbia/CBS	FCT 36865	074643686549 01	—	Chart Busters	
US	Sep 1989	Cassette	10	Columbia/CBS	FCT 36865	074643686549 01	—	Best Value Series	
US	Mar 1990	LP	10	Columbia/CBS	PC 36865	074643686518 02	—	The Nice Price	
US	Mar 1990	CD	10	Columbia/CBS	CK 36865	074643686525	—	The Nice Price	Longbox
US	Mar 1990	Cassette	10	Columbia/CBS	PCT 36865	074643686549 02	—	The Nice Price	
US	Apr 18, 1990	Cassette	10	Columbia/CBS	PCT 36865	074643686549 02	—	The Nice Price	full length cover
US	Oct 20, 1990	CD	10	Columbia/CBS	CK 36865	074643686525	—	The Nice Price	possibly released in a "The Nice Price" Longbox
US	Apr 1, 1993	CD	10	Columbia/CBS	CK 36865	074643686525	—	The Nice Price	Dogbone sticker
US	Sep 7, 1993	CD	10	Columbia/SMEI	CK 57367	074645736723	Special Limited Collector's Edition	Best Value	1993 Remaster; sched. for Aug 24, 1993 - delayed 2 weeks
US	Sep 7, 1993	Cassette	10	Columbia/SMEI	CT 57367	074645736747	—	Best Value	1993 Remaster; sched. for Aug 24, 1993 - delayed 2 weeks
US	Sep 14, 1993	MiniDisc	10	Columbia/SMEI	CM 57367	074645736785	—	—	1993 Remaster; sched. for Aug 24, 1993 - delayed 3 weeks
US	Feb 1, 2008	MP3 256k	10	Columbia/SBME	CK 57367	074645736723	—	—	1993 Remaster; album only
US	Jul 1, 2009	MP3 192k	10	Columbia/SME	CK 57367	074645736723	—	—	1993 Remaster; album only
US	Oct 6, 2009	MP3 320k	10	Columbia/SME	CK 57367	074645736723	—	—	1993 Remaster; album only; approx. date; issued between Oct 6 - Nov 28, 2009
US	Aug 26, 2011	MP3 256k	10	Columbia/SME	CK 57367	074645736723	—	—	1993 Remaster; individ. tracks
US	Aug 26, 2011	MP3 320k	10	Columbia/SME	CK 57367	074645736723	—	—	1993 Remaster; individ. tracks
US	Sep 6, 2011	AAC 256k	10	Columbia/SME	CK 57367	074645736723	—	—	1993 Remaster; individ. tracks
US	Nov 6, 2012	AAC 256k	10	Columbia/SME	88644 37119 4	886443711945	—	Mastered for iTunes	2012 Remaster; individ. tracks
US	Apr 21, 2014	FLAC 96/24	10	Columbia/SME	88644 37119 4	886443711945	—	—	2012 Remaster; album only
US	Sep 26, 2014	CD	10	Columbia/SMEI	CK 57367	888750363527	—	—	1993 Remaster; also listed as Jan 16, 2015
US	Sep 26, 2014	CD	10	Columbia/SMEI	CK 57367	888750363626	—	—	1993 Remaster; also listed as Nov 11, 2014
US	Jun 21, 2019	LP	10	Columbia/SME	19075846981	190758469812	—	—	140 Gram
US	Aug 7, 2019	AAC 256k	10	Columbia/SME	88644 37119 4	886443711945	—	Apple Digital Master	2012 Remaster; individ. tracks
US	Sep 27, 2019	FLAC 96/24	10	Columbia/SME	88644 37119 4	886443711945	—	—	2012 Remaster; album only
US	Nov 29, 2019	LP	10	Columbia/SME	19075977671	190759776711	—	Walmart Exclusive	White Vinyl

== See also ==
- List of best-selling albums in the United States
