= Made in America (EP) =

Made In America

EP by Aerosmith
- Released: March 18, 1997
- Genre: Hard rock, blues rock
- Length: 27:07
- Label: Columbia/Sony Music Special Products

Aerosmith EP chronology
Vacation Club (1988)	Made In America (1997)

Professional ratings
Review scores
Source	Rating
AllMusic	link

Made In America is an EP by Aerosmith, originally released on March 18, 1997, by Columbia/Sony Music. The EP was sold exclusively at Wal-Marts in Canada and the United States to coincide with the release of the Nine Lives album. On February 8, 2001, Columbia/Sony (with distribution from Resource Media) reissued the EP in the US for general release. This release was also exported to many different countries including Canada, France, Germany, Japan and the UK.

== Track listing ==
1. "Back in the Saddle" (Steven Tyler, Joe Perry) – 4:41
2. "Toys in the Attic" (Tyler, Perry) – 3:06
3. "Seasons of Wither" (Tyler) – 4:58
4. "Walk This Way" (Tyler, Perry) – 3:41
5. "Chip Away the Stone" (Richie Supa) –4:01
6. "One Way Street" (Live) (Tyler) – 6:40

== Trivia ==
"Chip Away The Stone" was originally released as a non-album single in 1978. A live version of the song appears on Live! Bootleg. It later appeared on Gems in 1988 as a studio version followed by an appearance on Pandora's Box as an alternate studio version.

"One Way Street" is a live recording from the opening night of The Mama Kin Music Hall on Lansdown Street in Boston, owned by Aerosmith. Broadcast on December 19, 1994, the full show from where the performance took place has never been released officially.

The other four songs on the EP are their respective album versions.

== Release history ==
Region	Date	Format	Label	Catalog No.	Notes
Canada	March 18, 1997	CD	Columbia/Sony Music Special Products/SMEI	IDK 85260	
Canada	March 18, 1997	Cassette	Columbia/Sony Music Special Products/SMEI	IDT 85260	
US	March 18, 1997	CD	Columbia/Sony Music Special Products/SMEI	A 28478	
US	March 18, 1997	Cassette	Columbia/Sony Music Special Products/SMEI	BT 28478	
US	February 8, 2001	CD	Columbia/Sony Music Special Products/SMEI	A 28478	
