= Pandora's Toys =

Compilation album by Aerosmith
- Released: June 8, 1994
- Recorded: 1972–1982
- Genre: Hard rock
- Length: 52:45
- Label: Columbia
- Producer: Don DeVito

Aerosmith compilation chronology
Pandora's Box (1991)	Pandora's Toys (1994)	Big Ones (1994)

Singles from Pandora's Toys
- 1. "Sweet Emotion" Released: 1995 (re-issue)

Professional ratings
Review scores
Source	Rating
AllMusic	link

Pandora's Toys is a compilation album released on June 8, 1994 by Aerosmith. The disc is a collection of tracks from their 1991 box set Pandora's Box.

It was also made available in a limited-edition wooden boxed set that contains the disc covered in a red plastic jewel case, a "Story of Aerosmith" documentary CD (narrated for the English market by Chris Barrie), a sticker, a sew-on patch and a certificate. It was released in a limited number of only 10,000 worldwide, making it highly collectible.

== Track listing ==
1. "Sweet Emotion" (Steven Tyler, Tom Hamilton)
2. "Draw the Line" (Tyler, Joe Perry)
3. "Walk This Way" (Tyler, Perry)
4. "Dream On" (Tyler)
5. "Train Kept A-Rollin'" (Tiny Bradshaw, Howard Kay, Lois Mann)
6. "Mama Kin" (Tyler)
7. "Nobody's Fault" (Tyler, Brad Whitford)
8. "Seasons of Wither" (Tyler)
9. "Big Ten Inch Record" [Live] (Fred Weismantel)
10. "All Your Love" (Otis Rush)
11. "Helter Skelter" (John Lennon, Paul McCartney)
12. "Chip Away the Stone" (Tyler, Perry, Richard Supa)

== See also ==
- Pandora's Box

== Chart positions ==
Chart (1994)	Peak position
Austrian Albums (Ö3 Austria)	14
Dutch Albums (Album Top 100)	41
German Albums (Offizielle Top 100)	52
Swiss Albums (Schweizer Hitparade)	21
