= Gems (Aerosmith album) =

1988 compilation album by Aerosmith

Compilation album by Aerosmith
- Released: November 15, 1988
- Recorded: 1972–1982
- Genre: Hard rock, blues rock
- Length: 53:26
- Label: Columbia
- Producer: David Krebs, Steve Leber, Gary Lyons, Adrian Barber, Tony Bongiovi, Jack Douglas, Steven Tyler, Ray Colcord

Aerosmith compilation chronology
Greatest Hits (1980)	Gems (1988)	Pandora's Box (1991)

Professional ratings
Review scores
Source	Rating
AllMusic	4.5/5 stars
Christgau's Record Guide	B

Gems is a compilation album released by Aerosmith in 1988 under the label Columbia. It was the first compilation of studio material since 1980's Greatest Hits. Concentrating mainly on heavier material than the radio-friendly singles output on Greatest Hits, the album is noted for the inclusion of the 1978 studio version of "Chip Away The Stone" – previously released as a single from 1978's Live! Bootleg, only a live rendition of the song was released at the time. Originally scheduled for release on November 8, 1988, the album was delayed one week and issued on November 15, 1988.

In 1993 the CD & Cassette Tape were reissued as part of the Aerosmith Remasters Series and Digitally Remastered From 20 Bit Digital Master Tape Transfers.

In 2007 The album was released by Sony BMG as part of their 'Collections' series entitled 'Greatest Hits' and reissued the following year by Sony in their 'Steel Box' series.

== Track listing ==
No.	Title	Writer(s)	Length
1.	"Rats in the Cellar" (from Rocks, 1976)	Steven Tyler, Joe Perry	4:06
2.	"Lick and a Promise" (from Rocks)	Tyler, Perry	3:05
3.	"Chip Away the Stone" (previously unreleased studio version, live version released previously on Live! Bootleg, 1978)	Richard Supa	4:01
4.	"No Surprize" (from Night in the Ruts, 1979)	Tyler, Perry	4:26
5.	"Mama Kin" (from Aerosmith, 1973)	Tyler	4:27
6.	"Adam's Apple" (from Toys in the Attic, 1975)	Tyler	4:34
7.	"Nobody's Fault" (from Rocks)	Brad Whitford, Tyler	4:18
8.	"Round and Round" (from Toys in the Attic)	Tyler, Whitford	5:03
9.	"Critical Mass" (from Draw the Line, 1977)	Tyler, Tom Hamilton, Jack Douglas	4:52
10.	"Lord of the Thighs" (from Get Your Wings, 1974)	Tyler	4:14
11.	"Jailbait" (from Rock in a Hard Place, 1982)	Tyler, Jimmy Crespo	4:39
12.	"Train Kept A-Rollin'" (from Get Your Wings)	Tiny Bradshaw, Howard Kay, Lois Mann	5:41

== Personnel ==
Aerosmith

- Steven Tyler – lead vocals, harmonica, piano, producer
- Tom Hamilton – bass
- Joey Kramer – drums, percussion
- Joe Perry – lead and rhythm guitar, backing vocals
- Brad Whitford – rhythm and lead guitar

Additional musicians

- Jimmy Crespo – lead guitar on "Jailbait"
- Rick Dufay – rhythm guitar on "Jailbait"
- David Woodford – Saxophone
- Richard Supa – Piano
- Scott Cushnie – Piano
- Mark Radice - Piano on "Chip Away The Stone"
- Uncredited guitarist on some songs.

Production

- David Krebs – Executive Producer
- Steve Leber – Executive Producer
- Gary Lyons – Producer
- Adrian Barber – Producer
- Tony Bongiovi – Producer
- Jack Douglas – Producer
- Ray Colcord – Producer
- Don DeVito – Digital Producer
- John Ingrassia – Project Administrator
- James Diener – Project Director
- Mark Wilder – Assembly, Engineer, Digital Mastering
- Keith Garde – Creative Supervision
- Caroline Greyshock – Photography
- Jimmy Ienner Jr. – Photography
- Darren S. Winston – Creative Consultant
- Joel Zimmerman – Art Supervisor
- Lisa Sparagano – Design
- Ken Fredette – Design
- Vic Anesini – Digital Mastering

== Chart positions ==
Chart (1988)	Peak position
Australian Albums (ARIA)	148
Finnish Albums (Suomen virallinen lista)	39
US Billboard 200	133

== Certification ==
Region	Certification	Certified units/sales
United States (RIAA)	Gold	500,000^{^}
^{^} Shipments figures based on certification alone.

== Release history ==
Region	Date	Format	Tracks	Label	Catalog #	Barcode	Edition	Series	Notes
USA	Nov 15, 1988	LP	12	Columbia/CBS	FC 44487	074644448719	—	—	sched. for Nov 8, 1988 - delayed 1 week
USA	Nov 15, 1988	CD	12	Columbia/CBS	CK 44487	074644448726	—	—	sched. for Nov 8, 1988 - delayed 1 week
USA	Nov 15, 1988	Cassette	12	Columbia/CBS	FCT 44487	074644448740	—	—	sched. for Nov 8, 1988 - delayed 1 week
USA	Oct 25, 1990	CD	12	Columbia/CBS	CK 44487	074644448726	—	The Nice Price	possibly released in a "The Nice Price" Longbox
USA	Jan 22, 1991	Cassette	12	Columbia/CBS	PCT 44487	074644448740 02	—	The Nice Price	approx. date
USA	Sep 7, 1993	CD	12	Columbia/SMEI	CK 57371	074645737126	Special Limited Collector's Edition	The Nice Price	1993 Remaster; sched. for Aug 24, 1993 - delayed 2 weeks
USA	Sep 7, 1993	Cassette	12	Columbia/SMEI	CT 57371	074645737140	—	The Nice Price	1993 Remaster; sched. for Aug 24, 1993 - delayed 2 weeks
USA	Feb 1, 2008	CD	12	Columbia/SMEI	CK 57371	886972387321	—	—	1993 Remaster
USA	Feb 1, 2008	MP3 256k	12	Columbia/SBME	CK 57371	886972387321	—	—	1993 Remaster; album only
USA	Jul 1, 2009	MP3 192k	12	Columbia/SME	CK 57371	886972387321	—	—	1993 Remaster; album only
USA	Oct 6, 2009	MP3 320k	12	Columbia/SME	CK 57371	886972387321	—	—	1993 Remaster; indiv. tracks; approx. date; issued between Oct 6 - Nov 28, 2009
USA	Nov 6, 2012	MP3 256k	12	Columbia/SME	88644 37119 6	886443711969	—	—	2012 Remaster; indiv. tracks
USA	Nov 6, 2012	AAC 256k	12	Columbia/SME	88644 37119 6	886443711969	—	—	2012 Remaster; indiv. tracks
USA	Apr 23, 2014	FLAC 96/24	12	Columbia/SME	88644 37119 6	886443711969	—	—	2012 Remaster; album only
USA	Dec 2014	MP3 320k + AAC 320k	12	Columbia/SME	CK 57371	886972387321	—	—	1993 Remaster; indiv. tracks; approx. date; issued between Dec 11 - 17, 2014
USA	Dec 2014	FLAC 44.1/16	12	Columbia/SME	CK 57371	886972387321	—	—	1993 Remaster; indiv. tracks; approx. date; issued between Dec 11 - 17, 2014
USA	Dec 23, 2014	AIFF 96/24	12	Columbia/SME	88644 37119 6	886443711969	—	—	2012 Remaster; album only
USA	Dec 23, 2014	ALAC 96/24	12	Columbia/SME	88644 37119 6	886443711969	—	—	2012 Remaster; album only
USA	Dec 23, 2014	WAV 96/24	12	Columbia/SME	88644 37119 6	886443711969	—	—	2012 Remaster; album only
USA	Aug 7, 2019	AAC 256k	12	Columbia/SME	88644 37119 6	886443711969	—	Apple Digital Master	2012 Remaster; indiv. tracks
USA	Sep 27, 2019	FLAC 96/24	12	Columbia/SME	88644 37119 6	886443711969	—	—	2012 Remaster; album only
