= Pandora's Box (album) =

- Original box cover, 1991

Box set by Aerosmith
- Released: November 19, 1991
- Recorded: 1966 ("When I Needed You"), 1971–1982
- Genres: Hard rock, blues rock
- Length: 230:53
- Label: Columbia
- Producer: Various

Aerosmith compilation chronology
Gems (1988)	Pandora's Box (1991)	Pandora's Toys (1994)

Singles from Pandora's Box
- 1. "Sweet Emotion" Released: 1991 (re-issue)

Pandora's Box is a compilation album, released on November 19, 1991, by Aerosmith. Issued by Columbia Records to capitalize on the band's newfound success with Geffen, the box set consists of three discs that cover Aerosmith's output from the 1970s and early 1980s. Alongside alternate versions, previously unreleased songs, live renditions and remixes, Pandora's Box features previously released studio material.

The original issue was as a long cardboard box, containing three CDs (each in its own jewel-case, with inserts) and a booklet that detailed the tracks and had comments from the band members. Later issues did away with the outer box, utilizing a cardboard slipcase, but reproduced the booklet in 'CD-size'.

The cover version of "Helter Skelter" is Aerosmith's third commercially released Beatles cover (after "Come Together" from the Sgt. Pepper's Lonely Hearts Club Band soundtrack and "I'm Down" from Permanent Vacation), despite being the first they recorded.

== Track listing ==
Disc one
No.	Title	Writer(s)	Length
1.	"When I Needed You" (Steven Tyler, pre-Aerosmith, with the band The Strangeurs/Chain Reaction)	Barry Shapiro, Steven Tallarico, Don Solomon, Alan Strohmayer, Peter Stahl	2:34
2.	"Make It" (from Aerosmith, with false start, 1973)	Steven Tyler	3:45
3.	"Movin' Out" (previously unreleased alternate version from the Aerosmith sessions)	Tyler, Joe Perry	5:42
4.	"One Way Street" (from Aerosmith)	Tyler	6:59
5.	"On the Road Again" (previously unreleased song from the Aerosmith sessions)	John Sebastian	3:36
6.	"Mama Kin" (from Aerosmith)	Tyler	4:25
7.	"Same Old Song and Dance" (from Get Your Wings, 1974)	Tyler, Perry	3:53
8.	"Train Kept A-Rollin'" (from Get Your Wings)	Tiny Bradshaw, Howard Kay, Lois Mann	5:33
9.	"Seasons of Wither" (from Get Your Wings)	Tyler	5:39
10.	"Write Me a Letter" (previously unreleased live version)	Tyler	4:18
11.	"Dream On" (from Aerosmith)	Tyler	4:25
12.	"Pandora's Box" (from Get Your Wings)	Tyler, Joey Kramer	5:42
13.	"Rattlesnake Shake" (previously unreleased live radio broadcast aired on WKRQ, Cincinnati)	Peter Green	10:28
14.	"Walkin' the Dog" (previously unreleased live radio broadcast aired on WKRQ, Cincinnati)	Rufus Thomas	3:13
15.	"Lord of the Thighs" (previously unreleased live version from Texxas Jam, Cottonbowl, Dallas, July 4, 1978)	Tyler	7:13
Total length:			1:17:44

Disc two
No.	Title	Writer(s)	Length
1.	"Toys in the Attic" (from Toys in the Attic, 1975)	Tyler, Perry	3:05
2.	"Round and Round" (from Toys in the Attic)	Tyler, Brad Whitford	5:02
3.	"Krawhitham" (from the Draw the Line sessions, 1977)	Kramer, Whitford, Tom Hamilton	3:59
4.	"You See Me Crying" (from Toys in the Attic)	Tyler, Don Solomon	5:12
5.	"Sweet Emotion" (from Toys in the Attic)	Tyler, Hamilton	4:34
6.	"No More No More" (from Toys in the Attic)	Tyler, Perry	4:33
7.	"Walk This Way" (from Toys in the Attic)	Tyler, Perry	3:40
8.	"I Wanna Know Why" (previously unreleased live version from Texxas Jam, Cottonbowl, Dallas, 1978-07-04)	Tyler, Perry	3:04
9.	"Big Ten-Inch Record" (previously unreleased live version from Texxas Jam, Cottonbowl, Dallas, 1978-07-04)	Fred Weismantel	4:01
10.	"Rats in the Cellar" (From Rocks, 1976)	Tyler, Perry	4:06
11.	"Last Child" (remix of the original version from Rocks)	Tyler, Whitford	3:52
12.	"All Your Love" (previously unreleased song. Recorded at the Cenacle, Armonk, New York, May 1977)	Otis Rush	5:27
13.	"Soul Saver" (previously unreleased rehearsal from the Toys in the Attic sessions)	Tyler, Whitford	0:53
14.	"Nobody's Fault" (from Rocks)	Tyler, Whitford	4:22
15.	"Lick and a Promise" (from Rocks)	Tyler, Perry	3:05
16.	"Adam's Apple" (previously unreleased live version recorded on tour in Indianapolis, Indiana, 1977-07-04)	Tyler	4:48
17.	"Draw the Line" (remix of the original version from Draw the Line, 1977)	Tyler, Perry	3:43
18.	"Critical Mass" (from Draw the Line)	Tyler, Hamilton, Jack Douglas	4:51
Total length:			1:12:38

Disc three
No.	Title	Writer(s)	Length
1.	"Kings and Queens" (from Classics Live, 1986)	Tyler, Hamilton, Whitford, Kramer, Douglas	5:33
2.	"Milkcow Blues" (from Draw the Line)	Kokomo Arnold	4:15
3.	"I Live in Connecticut" (previously unreleased rehearsal of "Three Mile Smile" from the Night in the Ruts sessions, 1979)	Tyler, Perry	0:56
4.	"Three Mile Smile" (from Night in the Ruts)	Tyler, Perry	3:45
5.	"Let It Slide" (previously unreleased rehearsal of "Cheese Cake" from the Night in the Ruts sessions)	Tyler, Perry	2:55
6.	"Cheese Cake" (from Night in the Ruts)	Tyler, Perry	4:16
7.	"Bone to Bone (Coney Island White Fish Boy)" (from Night in the Ruts)	Tyler, Perry	3:01
8.	"No Surprize" (from Night in the Ruts)	Tyler, Perry	4:27
9.	"Come Together" (from the Sgt. Pepper's Lonely Hearts Club Band soundtrack, 1978)	John Lennon, Paul McCartney	3:46
10.	"Downtown Charlie" (previously unreleased song from the Night in the Ruts sessions)	Aerosmith	2:34
11.	"Sharpshooter" (from the album Whitford/St. Holmes, 1981)	Whitford, Derek St. Holmes	5:32
12.	"Shit House Shuffle" (previously unreleased rehearsal)	Perry	0:36
13.	"South Station Blues" (from the album I've Got the Rock'n'Rolls Again by The Joe Perry Project, 1981)	Perry	4:11
14.	"Riff & Roll" (previously unreleased song from the Rock in a Hard Place sessions, 1981–82)	Tyler, Jimmy Crespo	3:18
15.	"Jailbait" (from Rock in a Hard Place, 1982)	Tyler, Crespo	4:40
16.	"Major Barbara" (previously unreleased alternate version, original version on Classics Live)	Tyler	5:06
17.	"Chip Away the Stone" (previously unreleased alternate version, studio version on Gems, 1988)	Tyler, Perry, Richard Supa	4:07
18.	"Helter Skelter" (previously unreleased song from the Toys in the Attic sessions)	Lennon, McCartney	3:16
19.	"Back in the Saddle" (from Rocks)	Tyler, Perry	4:49
20.	"Circle Jerk" (previously unreleased instrumental, not listed)	Whitford	3:44
Total length:			1:14:47

== Recording locations ==
- "When I Needed You" - Recorded at CBS Studios, New York City, New York, 10/5/66
- "Major Barbara" - Recorded at Power Station, New York City, New York, May 20, 1971 (?)
- "On the Road Again" - Recorded at Intermedia Sound, 5/8/72
- "Dream On" - Recorded at Intermedia Studios, Boston, Massachusetts, 1972
- "Make It" - Recorded at Intermedia Studios, Boston, Massachusetts, 1972
- "Mama Kin" - Recorded at Intermedia Studios, Boston, Massachusetts, 1972
- "Movin' Out" - Recorded at Intermedia Studios, Boston, Massachusetts, 1972
- "One Way Street" - Recorded at Intermedia Studios, Boston, Massachusetts, 1972
- "Rattlesnake Shake" - Recorded at Counterpart Studios, Cincinnati, September 26, 1973
- "Walkin' the Dog" - Recorded at Counterpart studios, Cincinnati, September 26, 1973
- "Pandora's Box" - Recorded at Record Plant Studios, New York City, New York, between 12/17/73 and 1/14/74
- "Same Old Song and Dance" - Recorded at Record Plant Studios, New York City, New York, between 12/17/73 and 1/14/74
- "Seasons of Wither" - Recorded at Record Plant Studios, New York City, New York, between 12/17/73 and 1/14/74
- "Train Kept A-Rollin'" - Recorded at Record Plant Studios, New York City, New York, between 12/17/73 and 1/14/74
- "Helter Skelter" - Recorded at Great Northern Recording Studios, 1975
- "No More No More" - Recorded at Record Plant Studios, New York City, New York, February, 1975
- "Round and Round" - Recorded at Record Plant Studios, New York City, New York, February, 1975
- "Soul Saver" - Recorded at Record Plant Studios, New York City, New York, February, 1975
- "Sweet Emotion" - Recorded at Record Plant Studios, New York City, New York, February, 1975
- "Toys in the Attic" - Recorded at Record Plant Studios, New York City, New York, February, 1975
- "Walk This Way" - Recorded at Record Plant Studios, New York City, New York, February, 1975
- "You See Me Crying" - Recorded at Record Plant Studios, New York City, New York, February, 1975
- "Back in the Saddle" - Recorded at the Wherehouse, Waltham, Mass. & Record Plant Studios, New York City, New York, Feb-March 1976
- "Last Child" - Recorded at the Wherehouse, Waltham, Mass. & Record Plant Studios, New York City, New York, Feb-March, 1976
- "Lick and a Promise" - Recorded at the Wherehouse, Waltham, Massachusetts & Record Plant Studios, New York City, New York, Feb-March, 1976
- "Nobody's Fault" - Recorded at the Wherehouse, Waltham, Massachusetts & Record Plant Studios, New York City, New York, Feb-March, 1976
- "Rats in the Cellar" - Recorded at the Wherehouse, Waltham, Mass. & Record Plant Studios, New York City, New York, Feb-March, 1976
- "Write Me a Letter" - Recorded on tour in Boston, Massachusetts, November 1976
- "Krawitham" - Recorded at the Cenacle, Armonk, New York, 5/2/77
- "Circle Jerk" - Recorded at the Cenacle, Armonk, New York, & Record Plant Studios, NYC, June-Oct., 1977 (?)
- "Critical Mass" - Recorded at the Cenacle, Armonk, New York, & Record Plant Studios, NYC, June-Oct., 1977
- "Draw the Line" - Recorded at the Cenacle, Armonk, NY, & Record Plant Studios, New York City, New York, June-Oct., 1977
- "Milkcow Blues" - Recorded at the Cenacle, Armonk, New York, & Record Plant Studios, New York City, New York, June-Oct., 1977
- "Kings and Queens" - Recorded live on tour in Boston, Massachusetts, 3/28/78
- "Chip Away the Stone" - Recorded at Long View Farm, North Brookfield, Massachusetts, June 4, 1978
- "I Wanna Know Why" - Recorded on tour at the Cotton Bowl, Dallas, Texas, 7/4/78
- "Lord of the Thighs" - Recorded on tour at the Cottonbowl, Dallas, Texas, 7/4/78
- "Downtown Charlie" - Recorded at The Record Plant, New York City, New York, 8/19/78
- "Come Together" - Recorded at the Wherehouse, Waltham, Massachusetts, 8/21/78
- "I Live in Connecticut" - Recorded at The Wherehouse, Waltham, Massachusetts, 3/10/79
- "Let It Slide" - Recorded at Mediasound Studios, New York City, New York, March, 1979
- "Shit House Shuffle" - Recorded at Mediasound, New York City, New York, 5/30/79
- "Three Mile Smile" - Recorded at Mediasound and Record Plant Studios, New York City, New York, 7/10/79
- "Cheese Cake" - Recorded at Mediasound and Record Plant Studios, New York City, New York, May-Aug., 1979
- "No Surprize" - Recorded at Mediasound and Record Plant Studios, New York City, New York, May-Aug., 1979
- "Sharpshooter" - Recorded at Axis Studios, Atlanta, Georgia, 1980–81
- "Riff & Roll" - Recorded at Power Station, New York City, New York, 9/16/81
- "South Station Blues" - Recorded at Boston Opera House and Wherehouse, Waltham, Massachusetts, 1981
- "Jailbait" - Recorded at Power Station, NYC & Criteria Studios, Miami, Florida, 1982

== Reception ==
Professional ratings
Review scores
Source	Rating
AllMusic	4/5 stars
Collector's Guide to Heavy Metal	8/10
The Encyclopedia of Popular Music	3/5 stars
Entertainment Weekly	B
Q	3/5 stars

"Pandora's Box has 31 previously released songs and 21 live cuts, alternate takes and rarities," noted Mat Snow in Q. "Will this latter stuff be made separately available for the fan doesn't fancy shelling out for tracks already owned? Probably not… Despite high times aplenty, Pandora's Box is a career overview which offers a patchy, expensive introduction to the newcomer, and falls irritatingly between the stools of rarities collection and definitive compilation."

== See also ==
- Pandora's Toys

== Charts ==
Chart (1991)	Peak position
Australian Albums (ARIA)	133
Canada Top Albums/CDs (RPM)	82
US Billboard 200	45

== Certification ==
Region	Certification	Certified units/sales
United States (RIAA)	Platinum	1,000,000^{^}
^{^} Shipments figures based on certification alone.

== Release history ==
Region	Date	Format	Tracks	Label	Catalog #	Barcode	Edition	Series	Notes
USA	Nov 19, 1991	CD x 3	53	Columbia/SMEI	C3K 46209	074644620924	Deluxe	—	Longbox; 64-page booklet
USA	Nov 19, 1991	Cassette x 3	53	Columbia/SMEI	C3T 46209	074644620948	Deluxe	—	Longbox; 64-page booklet
USA	Mar 18, 1997	CD x 3	53	Columbia/SMEI	C3K 67995	074646799529		—	Slipcase; double jewel case; 36-page booklet
USA	Aug 6, 2002	CD x 3	53	Columbia/SMEI	C3K 86567	696998656727	Deluxe	—	Digibook; booklet
USA	Feb 1, 2008	MP3 256k	53	Columbia/SBME	C3K 46209	074644620924	—	—	album only
USA	Feb 1, 2008	MP3 256k	53	Columbia/SBME	C3K 86567	696998656727	—	—	album only
USA	Jul 1, 2009	MP3 192k	53	Columbia/SME	C3K 86567	696998656727	—	—	album only
USA	Oct 6, 2009	MP3 320k	53	Columbia/SME	C3K 46209	074644620924	—	—	indiv. tracks; approx. date; issued between Oct 6 - Nov 28, 2009
USA	Oct 6, 2009	MP3 320k	53	Columbia/SME	C3K 86567	696998656727	—	—	album only; approx. date; issued between Oct 6 - Nov 28, 2009
USA	Aug 26, 2011	MP3 256k	53	Columbia/SME	C3K 46209	074644620924	—	—	51 indiv. tracks, 2 album only
USA	Aug 26, 2011	MP3 320k	53	Columbia/SME	C3K 46209	074644620924	—	—	52 indiv. tracks, 1 album only
USA	Sep 6, 2011	AAC 256k	53	Columbia/SME	C3K 46209	074644620924	—	—	51 indiv. tracks, 2 album only
USA	Dec 2014	MP3 320k + AAC 320k	53	Columbia/SME	C3K 46209	074644620924	—	—	51 indiv. tracks, 2 album only; approx. date; issued between Dec 11 - 17, 2014
USA	Dec 2014	FLAC 44.1/16	53	Columbia/SME	C3K 46209	074644620924	—	—	51 indiv. tracks, 2 album only; approx. date; issued between Dec 11 - 17, 2014
