= Draw the Line =

Draw the Line may refer to:

- Draw the Line (Aerosmith album), 1977
  - "Draw the Line" (song), 1977
- Draw the Line (David Gray album) or the title song, 2009
- Draw the Line (Ghetto Mafia album) or the title song, 1994
- Draw the Line (Philippine TV program), a 2005 Philippine TV series
- Draw the Line (Chinese TV series), a 2022 series

== See also ==
- Drawing the Line (disambiguation)
- Line in the Sand (disambiguation)
