= Live! Bootleg =

Live album by Aerosmith
- Released: October 1978
- Recorded: 1973, 1977, 1978
- Genres: Hard rock; blues rock
- Length: 75:39
- Label: Columbia
- Producers: Jack Douglas; Aerosmith

Aerosmith chronology
Draw the Line (1977)	Live! Bootleg (1978)	Night in the Ruts (1979)

Aerosmith live chronology
Live! Bootleg (1978)	Classics Live! (1986)

Singles from Live! Bootleg
- 1. "Chip Away the Stone" Released: December 8, 1978

Live! Bootleg is a double live album by American hard rock band Aerosmith, released in October 1978. While most of the performances were drawn from concerts in 1977 and 1978, "I Ain't Got You" and "Mother Popcorn" were taken from a radio broadcast of a Boston performance on March 20, 1973.

== Background ==
During their 1978 tour, several of the band's concerts were professionally recorded by producer Jack Douglas for radio broadcast, and subsequently bootlegged. Douglas remembers, "At the same time that we were recording that album [Draw the Line], we were doing live radio broadcasts. Right over the air, man. There were some amazing bootlegs made from those broadcasts." In an effort to combat the illegal records, the band's management asked Douglas to compile the double live album. The design of the album is intended to imitate the poor production of contemporary bootleg records, even going so far as to give an incorrect track listing: the song "Draw the Line" is included on the record but does not appear listed; the track is a hidden track after "Mother Popcorn".

In addition to previously unrecorded covers "I Ain't Got You" and "Mother Popcorn", the album also features a version of "Train Kept A-Rollin'" which inserts an uncredited "Strangers in the Night". The record also features the first record appearance of Richie Supa's "Chip Away the Stone" (the studio version of this song would later be released on a 1980 reissue of the "Draw the Line" single), and one of their first live performances of the Beatles "Come Together", which they recorded for the soundtrack album Sgt. Pepper's Lonely Hearts Club Band.

== Release and legacy ==
Professional ratings
Review scores
Source	Rating
AllMusic	3/5 stars
Collector's Guide to Heavy Metal	7/10
The Encyclopedia of Popular Music	3/5 stars
Music Week	3/4 stars
The Rolling Stone Album Guide	1/5 stars

The back of the CD cover includes two coffee stains over the picture of Joe Perry playing before a live audience. The original LP cover had the coffee stains, but not the picture of Perry, which was part of the gatefold artwork.

In the band memoir Walk this Way, Perry recalls, "I didn't want to do a live album at the time because there were so many perfect live albums coming out, all doctored and fixed and overdubbed. Big deal. Double live album - 'standard of the industry'. I felt like we had to avoid that and do a real live album like Live at Leeds or Get Yer Ya Ya's Out or that old Kinks album." In his own 2014 memoir Rocks, Perry said that the idea behind the LP confounded their label Columbia: "We were working on Live! Bootleg!, an album of old shows that we intentionally wanted to sound bootlegged. A couple of those tracks were recorded off air onto a cassette. It had hiss all over it. We left on the hiss because the hiss was real. But I'm not sure Columbia ever understood our concept. They wanted a clean sound, but we wanted to keep it real. That's the thrill of a real bootleg." Singer Tyler states, "The album is a reflection of the band, as we feel and sound. It features material and experiences taken from all types of concerts we've played. It's really the essence of the whole band."

Guns N’ Roses guitarist Slash has expressed his affection for the album. He explains,

That was the big one for me. Live! Bootleg is one of the most underrated albums of all time, one of the best live Rock 'n' Roll albums ever made. It started the trend for me to go out and discover new bands by buying their live albums, because that way I could get all the best songs and for me the whole live thing was the most exciting thing in the world. The way that Live! Bootleg starts with "Back In The Saddle", that whole intro with the crowd going crazy and the flash-pots going off, that whole build-up, made it so exciting to me.

== Track listing ==
Side one
No.	Title	Writer(s)	Length
1.	"Back in the Saddle" (Indianapolis, IN, July 4, 1977)	Steven Tyler, Joe Perry	4:25
2.	"Sweet Emotion" (Chicago, IL, March 23, 1978)	Tyler, Tom Hamilton	4:42
3.	"Lord of the Thighs" (Chicago, IL, March 23, 1978)	Tyler	7:18
4.	"Toys in the Attic" (Boston Music Hall, Boston, MA, March 28, 1978)	Tyler, Perry	3:45

Side two
No.	Title	Writer(s)	Length
5.	"Last Child" (The Paradise Club, Boston, MA, August 9, 1978)	Tyler, Brad Whitford	3:14
6.	"Come Together" (The Wherehouse, Waltham, MA, August 21, 1978)	John Lennon, Paul McCartney	4:51
7.	"Walk This Way" (Detroit, MI, April 2, 1978)	Tyler, Perry	3:46
8.	"Sick as a Dog" (Indianapolis, IN, July 4, 1977)	Tyler, Hamilton	4:42

Side three
No.	Title	Writer(s)	Length
1.	"Dream On" (Louisville, KY, July 3, 1977)	Tyler	4:31
2.	"Chip Away the Stone" (Civic Auditorium, Santa Monica, CA, April 8, 1978)	Richard Supa	4:12
3.	"Sight for Sore Eyes" (Columbus, OH, March 24, 1978)	Tyler, Perry, Jack Douglas, David Johansen	3:18
4.	"Mama Kin" (Indianapolis, IN, July 4, 1977)	Tyler	3:43
5.	"S.O.S. (Too Bad)" (Indianapolis, IN, July 4, 1977)	Tyler	2:46

Side four
No.	Title	Writer(s)	Length
6.	"I Ain't Got You" (Paul's Mall, Boston, MA, March 20, 1973; WBCN-FM radio simulcast)	Calvin Carter	3:57
7.	"Mother Popcorn" / "Draw the Line [*]" (Paul's Mall, Boston, MA, March 20, 1973; WBCN-FM radio simulcast / Tower Theater, Upper Darby, Philadelphia, PA, March 26, 1978)	James Brown, Pee Wee Ellis / Tyler, Perry	11:35
8.	"Train Kept A-Rollin'" / "Strangers in the Night" (Detroit, MI, April 2, 1978)	Tiny Bradshaw, Howard Kay, Lois Mann / Bert Kaempfert, Charlie Singleton, Eddie Snyder	4:51

[*] "Draw the Line" is featured as a hidden track at the end of "Mother Popcorn"

== Personnel ==
Aerosmith

- Steven Tyler – lead vocals, harmonica
- Joe Perry – guitar
- Brad Whitford – guitar
- Tom Hamilton – bass guitar
- Joey Kramer – drums, percussion

Additional musicians

- Mark Radice – keyboards, backing vocals
- David Woodford – saxophone on "Mother Popcorn"

Production

- Jack Douglas – producer, engineer
- David Krebs, Steve Leber – executive producers, management
- Jay Messina, Lee DeCarlo – engineers
- Julie Last, Rod O'Brien, Sam Ginsburg – assistant engineers
- David Hewitt – Record Plant Mobile operator (New York)
- Chris Stone – Record Plant Mobile operator (Los Angeles)
- George Marino – mastering at Sterling Sound, New York
- John Kosh – art direction, design
- Jimmy Ienner Jr., Barry Levine, Ron Pownall, Aaron Rapoport, Steve Smith – photography

== Charts ==
=== Weekly charts ===
Chart (1978–1979)	Peak position
Canada Top Albums/CDs (RPM)	27
French Albums (SNEP)	19
Japanese Albums (Oricon)	24
US Billboard 200	13

=== Year-end charts ===
Chart (1979)	Position
US Billboard 200	91

== Certifications ==
Region	Certification	Certified units/sales
Canada (Music Canada)	Gold	50,000^{^}
United States (RIAA)	Platinum	1,000,000^{^}
^{^} Shipments figures based on certification alone.
