= Draw the Line (song) =

Song by Aerosmith

Single by Aerosmith

from the album Draw the Line
- B-side: "Bright Light Fright"
- Released: October 6, 1977
- Recorded: 1977
- Genre: Hard rock; blues rock
- Length: 3:24
- Label: Columbia
- Songwriter(s): Steven Tyler; Joe Perry
- Producer(s): Jack Douglas

Aerosmith singles chronology
"Back in the Saddle" (1977)	"Draw the Line" (1977)	"Kings and Queens" (1978)

"Draw the Line" is a song by American hard rock band Aerosmith. It was written by Steven Tyler and Joe Perry, and was released in 1977 as the first single (and title track) from the album Draw the Line. It peaked at number 42 on the Billboard Hot 100. It was included on their album Greatest Hits.

== Composition ==
The song encompasses many of the typical things Aerosmith is known for, including the strong rhythm backbeat by Tom Hamilton and Joey Kramer, along with the back-and-forth interplay between guitarists Joe Perry and Brad Whitford. The song slows down before building to a climax showcasing Steven Tyler's trademark scream.

== In concert ==
Lately in concert, however, the chief focus is on lead guitarist Joe Perry, who plays an extended guitar solo before the song's climax, and makes use of the open tuning used for the song by performing a number of tricks made possible by said tuning. These include placing the guitar on the floor and beating it with his shirt and having drummer Joey Kramer beat a rhythm over the strings with his drumsticks. The song appears as a hidden track on Live! Bootleg following their cover of James Brown's "Mother Popcorn".

On more recent tours, he has also been known to employ a theremin in an extended breakdown of the song, often imitating Jimmy Page's use of one in Led Zeppelin's heyday. The band often follow with a brief snippet of Zeppelin's "Whole Lotta Love" before returning into the song.

== B-side ==
"Bright Light Fright", sung by Joe Perry, also from the Draw The Line album appears as the B-side on most versions of the single. A later Columbia "Hall Of Fame" single pairs "Draw The Line" with Chip Away the Stone, a standalone 1978 single that did not appear on an LP until 1988's Gems.

== Covers and remixes ==
Thrash metal band Testament recorded a cover of "Draw the Line" for a greatest hits compilation, making it the second Aerosmith song they have covered, the first being "Nobody's Fault".

Jeff Keith, Tommy Skeoch, Tony Levin and Eric Singer covered the song for the Aerosmith tribute album Not the Same Old Song and Dance (Eagle Records, 1999).

A stereo remix is on Pandora's Box and the O, Yeah! Ultimate Aerosmith Hits compilation.

Pearl Jam performed a cover of the song for the first time at their August 5, 2016 show at Boston's Fenway Park.
