= Line in the Sand =

Line in the sand is an idiom, a metaphorical (sometimes literal) point beyond which no further advance will be accepted or made.

Line(s) in the Sand may also refer to:

- Lines in the Sand (book), a 2007 book by Steve Bickerstaff about the 2003 Texas congressional redistricting
- Line in the sand match, an infamous Australian rules football match in 2004
- Lines in the Sand, a 2003 novel by Rhiannon Lassiter
- A Line in the Sand (TV series), a 2004 British television mini-series
- A Line in the Sand (film) (2008), a made-for-TV movie directed by Jeffrey Chernov
- A Line in the Sand (board game), a 1991 board game by TSR
- A Line in the Sand (video game), a 1992 video game by Strategic Simulations based on the board game
- "A Line in the Sand", a 1998 book in the Dear America series
- Line in the Sand, a 2024 documentary film directed by James O'Keefe

== Television episodes ==
- "Line in the Sand" (Stargate SG-1), an episode of Stargate SG-1
- "Lines in the Sand" (House), a 2006 episode of the TV series House
- "Line in the Sand", a 2000 episode of the TV series La Femme Nikita
- "Line in the Sand", a 1996 episode of the TV series Pacific Blue
- "A Line in the Sand" (Lego Ninjago: Masters of Spinjitzu), a 2017 episode of the TV series Lego Ninjago: Masters of Spinjitzu

== Music ==
- Line in the Sand (ZOX album), 2008
- Line in the Sand (Close Your Eyes album), 2013
- "Line in the Sand" (Bleeding Through song), 2007
- "Line in the Sand" (Motörhead song), 2004
- Lines in the Sand (Antonio Sanchez & Migration album), 2019
- "Line in the Sand", a song by Brett Kissel from his 2023 album The Compass Project
- "Lines in the Sand", a song by Dream Theater from their 1997 album Falling into Infinity
- "A Line in the Sand", a song by Linkin Park from their 2014 album The Hunting Party
- "Line in the Sand", a song by Art Alexakis from his 2019 album Sun Songs
