= Get It Up (Aerosmith song) =

1978 single by Aerosmith

Single by Aerosmith

from the album Draw the Line
- B-side: "Milk Cow Blues"
- Released: April 6, 1978
- Genre: Funk, rock
- Length: 4:02
- Label: Columbia
- Songwriter(s): Steven Tyler; Joe Perry
- Producer(s): Jack Douglas

Aerosmith singles chronology
"Kings and Queens" (1978)	"Get It Up" (1978)	"Come Together" (1978)

"Get It Up" is a song by American rock band Aerosmith. Written by lead singer Steven Tyler and guitarist Joe Perry, the song features Karen Lawrence, singer of the band L.A. Jets, on the chorus. It was released in 1978 as the third and final single from their album Draw the Line. The single also included "Milk Cow Blues" as a B-side. The single failed to break into the singles chart. The guitar is noted for its usage of slide guitar. The single had a reference to the next track on the album, "Bright Light Fright". The song was played occasionally by the band during the Aerosmith Express Tour from 1977 to 1978 in support of the Draw the Line album.

== Critical reception ==
In a 1979 issue of Rolling Stone, Aerosmith's then-manager David Krebs commented on the state of the band's commercial performance, saying "...the essence of Aerosmith's lyrics...has always been a positive, macho sexuality...Draw the Line wasn't like that. You know the song 'Get It Up'? The lyrics really say "'Can't get it up.' Kids who are stoned and having sexual relationships don't want to hear 'Can't get it up.'" Billboard Magazine stated that "Aerosmith's power charged heavy metal sound works well here." Cash Box said that "the dominating guitar work slides and grinds," and that the song has a "good hook." In a retrospective review for Ultimate Classic Rock, Sterling Whitaker cited the song as an example of a Draw the Line track that "should-have-been-great-but-not-quite", saying that it "featured important elements of the classic Aerosmith sound, but somehow didn't catch fire." Biographer Richard Bienstock called it a "limp funk workout".
