= Kings and Queens (Aerosmith song) =

Song by Aerosmith

Single by Aerosmith

from the album Draw the Line
- B-side: "Critical Mass"
- Released: February 21, 1978
- Recorded: June–October 1977
- Studio: Cenacle, Armonk, New York; Record Plant, New York City
- Genre: Hard rock; heavy metal; progressive rock
- Length: 4:55 (album version); 3:47 (single version)
- Label: Columbia
- Songwriter(s): Steven Tyler; Brad Whitford; Tom Hamilton; Joey Kramer; Jack Douglas
- Producer(s): Jack Douglas; Aerosmith

Aerosmith singles chronology
| "Draw the Line" (1977) | "Kings and Queens" (1978) | "Get It Up" (1978) |

"Kings and Queens" is a song by American hard rock band Aerosmith. It was written by Steven Tyler, Brad Whitford, Tom Hamilton, Joey Kramer, and Jack Douglas, their producer, who helped the band write many of the songs on Draw the Line. Douglas also played the mandolin featured in the song. The song first appeared on the album Draw the Line in December 1977 and was released as a single on February 21, 1978. The song was also used as a B-side to Aerosmith's version of The Beatles' "Come Together", released to promote the Sgt. Pepper's Lonely Hearts Club Band film and soundtrack.

== Lyrical meaning ==
Steven Tyler said of "Kings and Queens" in the liner notes to Pandora's Box:

This one was just about how many people died from holy wars because of their beliefs or non-beliefs. With that one, my brain was back with the knights of the round table...

== Reception ==
Cash Box said it has "a big production, driving beat and cymbal work, tight vocals, guitars and a piano-bass interlude." Record World said that "Steve Tyler's musings on European history make for an enjoyable hard-rock single."

== Charts ==
| Chart (1978) | Peak position |
|---|---|
| Canada (RPM100 Top Singles) | 76 |
| US Billboard Hot 100 | 70 |

== In concert ==
The song was a staple of Aerosmith concerts in the late 1970s and early 1980s, and was included on the album Classics Live!. This version was also included on Pandora's Box. The band brought the song back into the set list during shows in Providence, Rhode Island and Anaheim, California in 2005 and 2006 on the Rockin' the Joint Tour, and in São Paulo, Brazil and Sölvesborg, Sweden in 2010 on the Cocked, Locked, Ready to Rock Tour. It was played during the 2014 Jones Beach show.

== Covers and other versions ==
The song was included on the albums Aerosmith's Greatest Hits in 1980 and Greatest Hits 1973–1988 in 2004, but was considerably edited, with many of the guitar parts removed. This edited version is sometimes heard on radio, although many rock stations do play the full version.

"Kings and Queens" is a master track in the game Guitar Hero: Aerosmith and is unlocked upon beating the last song, "Train Kept A-Rollin".

Glenn Hughes recorded a version of the song in 2011.
