= Major Barbara (disambiguation) =

Major Barbara is a play by George Bernard Shaw.

Major Barbara may also refer to:

- Major Barbara (film), a 1941 film based on the play
- "Major Barbara," a song by the rock band Aerosmith on their album Pandora's Box
