= Drawing the Line =

Drawing the Line may refer to:

- Drawing the Line (book), a 1962 book republication of Paul Goodman's "The May Pamphlet"
- Drawing the Line (film), a 1915 short film by B. Reeves Eason
- Drawing the Line: A Portrait of Keith Haring, a 1989 short documentary film about American artist Keith Haring
- Drawing the Line (play), a 2013 play by Howard Brenton
- "Drawing the Line", a track from the 2009 album The Incident by British progressive rock band Porcupine Tree

== See also ==
- Draw the Line (disambiguation)
