= Come Together =

1969 single by the Beatles

- 1989 UK reissue picture sleeve

Single by the Beatles

from the album Abbey Road
- A-side: "Something" (double A-side)
- Released: 6 October 1969
- Recorded: 21–30 July 1969
- Studio: EMI, London
- Genre: Blues rock; swamp rock; rock and roll
- Length: 4:19
- Label: Apple
- Songwriter: Lennon–McCartney
- Producer: George Martin

The Beatles singles chronology
"The Ballad of John and Yoko" (1969)	"Come Together" / "Something" (1969)	"Let It Be" (1970)

Audio sample
- file; help

Music video
- "Come Together" on YouTube

"Come Together" is a song by the English rock band the Beatles, written by John Lennon and credited to Lennon–McCartney. The song is the opening track on the band's 1969 studio album Abbey Road. It was also a double A-side in the United Kingdom with "Something", reaching No. 4 in the UK charts, as well as No. 1 on the Billboard Hot 100.

The song has been covered by other artists, notably Ike & Tina Turner, Aerosmith, Arctic Monkeys, Gary Clark Jr. and Michael Jackson.

== Background and inspiration ==
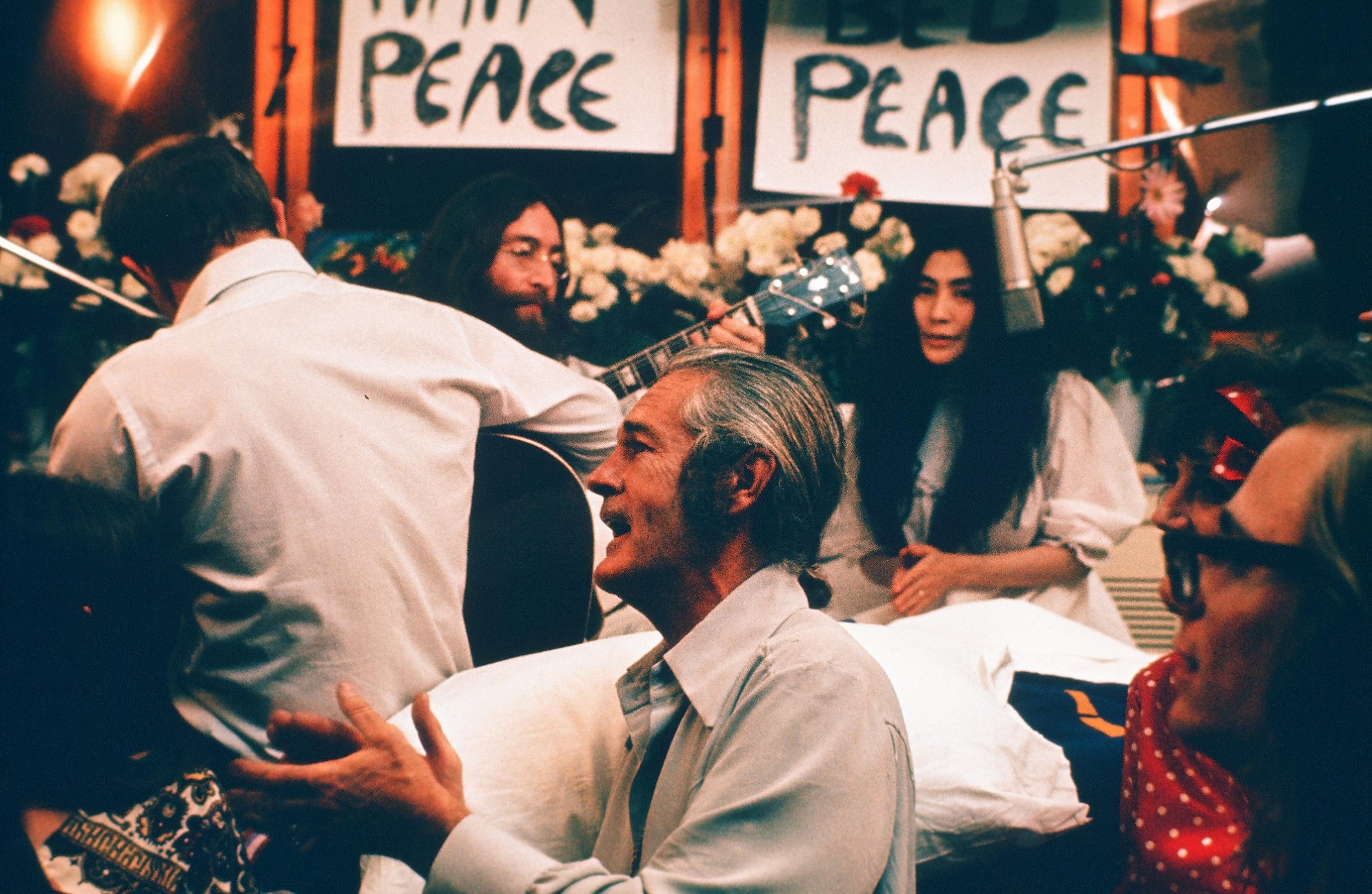
Timothy Leary (centre) with John Lennon and Yoko Ono (centre left and centre right) during the Montreal Bed-in for Peace, 1 June 1969

In early 1969, John Lennon and his wife, Yoko Ono, held nonviolent protests against the Vietnam War, dubbed the Bed-ins for Peace. In May, during the Montreal portion of the bed-in, counterculture figures from across North America visited Lennon. Among the visitors was the American psychologist Timothy Leary, an early advocate of LSD whom Lennon admired. Leary intended to run for Governor of California in the following year's election, and he asked Lennon to write him a campaign song based on the campaign's slogan, "Come Together – Join the Party!" The resulting chant was only a line long: "Come together and join the party". Lennon promised to finish and record the song, and Leary later recalled Lennon giving him a tape of the piece, but the two did not interact again.

In July 1969, during sessions for the Beatles' album Abbey Road, Lennon used the phrase "come together" from the Leary campaign song to compose a new song for the album. Based on the 1956 single "You Can't Catch Me" by the American guitarist Chuck Berry, Lennon's composition began as an up-tempo blues number, only slightly altering Berry's original lyric of "Here come a flattop / He was movin' up with me" to "Here come ol' flattop / He come groovin' up slowly". Lennon further incorporated the phrase "shoot me" from his unfinished and unreleased January 1969 song "Watching Rainbows". The author Peter Doggett wrote that "each phrase [passes] too quickly to be understood at first hearing, the sound as important as the meaning".

In a December 1987 interview by Selina Scott on the television show West 57th Street, George Harrison stated that he wrote two lines of the song.

== Production ==
=== Recording ===
The Beatles taped the basic track for "Come Together" at EMI Studios (now Abbey Road Studios) in Studio Three on 21 July 1969, during the sessions for Abbey Road. George Martin produced the session, assisted by the balance engineers Geoff Emerick and Phil McDonald. At McCartney's request, the session marked Emerick's first with the group since July 1968; Emerick had quit working with the group during sessions for their 1968 album, The Beatles (also known as "the White Album"), due to what he found to be a tense and negative atmosphere. (Note: The session on 21 July marked the first time a freelance engineer worked for the studio, since Emerick had quit EMI a week earlier.) The song was Lennon's first new composition for the band in three months, after he and McCartney recorded "The Ballad of John and Yoko" on 14 April. (Note: In the intervening time, Lennon and his wife, Yoko Ono, released "Give Peace a Chance" as the Plastic Ono Band, recorded on 1 June 1969 and released in the beginning of July 1969.)

The group taped eight takes of "Come Together", with take six marked "best". The line-up consisted of Lennon singing lead vocal, McCartney on bass, George Harrison on rhythm guitar and Ringo Starr on drums. Starr placed tea towels over his tom drums to further dampen their sound. Without needing to use his hands to play guitar, Lennon added handclaps each time he sang "Shoot me!", also adding tambourine over both the solo and coda. Taped on 4-track recording equipment, at the end of the session, take six was copied over to 8-track tape in Studio Two, allowing for both overdubbing and the easy manipulation of EQ.

=== Overdubbing and mixing ===
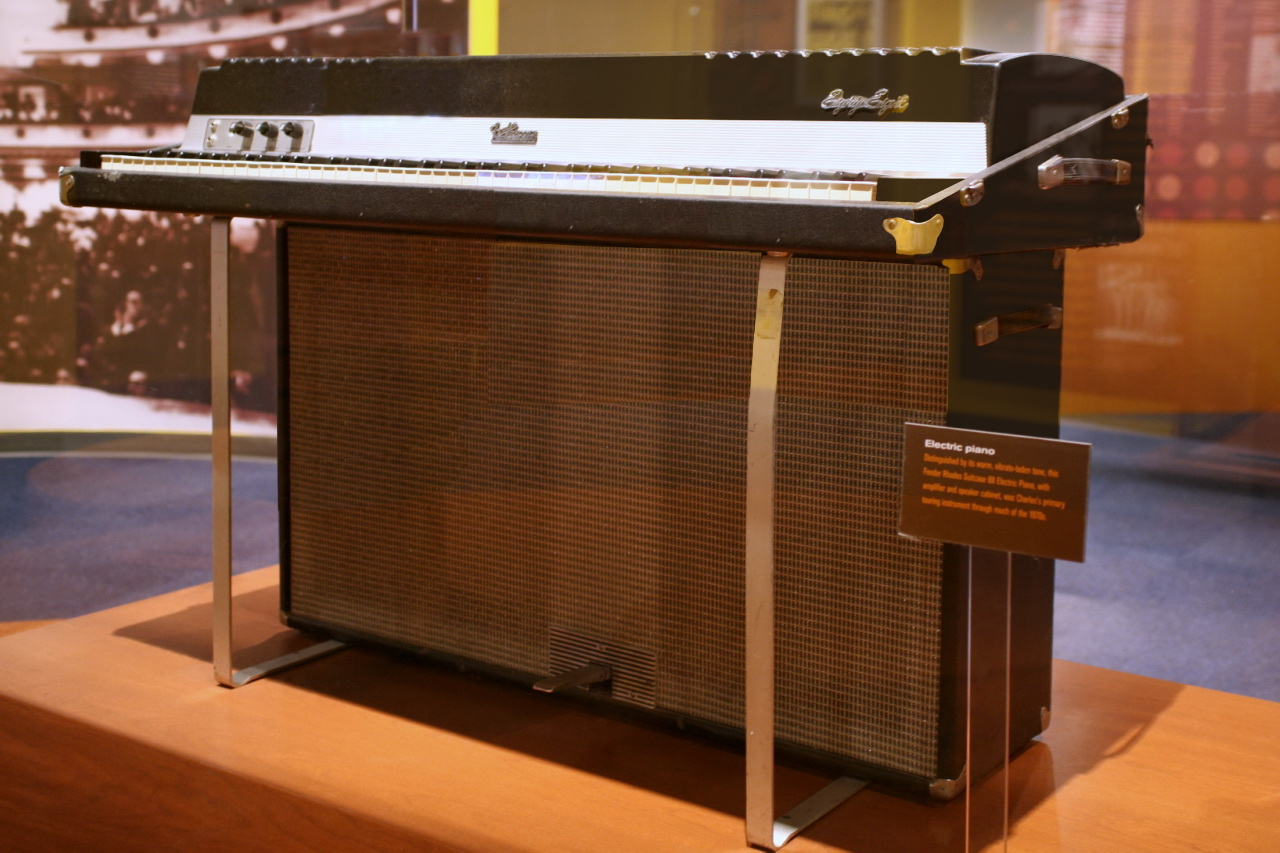
A Fender Rhodes electric piano, similar to the one McCartney plays on the recording

Overdubbing for "Come Together" took place in the week following the recording of the basic track. On 22 July, Lennon sang a new lead vocal and again added handclaps, both being treated to a tape delay, with automatic double tracking added during the choruses. At Lennon's request, McCartney played a Fender Rhodes electric piano, with McCartney later recalling that Lennon "wanted a piano lick to be very swampy and smokey, and I played it that way and he liked that a lot". (Note: McCartney recalled being happy at Lennon's praise, further stating: "Whenever [John] did praise any of us, it was great praise, indeed, because he didn't dish it out much. If ever you got a speck of it, a crumb of it, you were quite grateful".) Harrison added a heavily distorted guitar during the refrains, while Starr added a maraca. Work on the track continued the next day, with more vocals added. On 25 July, McCartney contributed a harmony vocal sung below Lennon's part, and on 29 July, Lennon overdubbed a guitar during the song's middle climax. Work on the song finished the next day, with Harrison playing a lead guitar solo with a Gibson Les Paul during the song's coda.

Mixing on "Come Together" was completed on 7 August in Studio Two. Done on EMI's new solid state mixing console, the EMI TG12345, Emerick later suggested that the console's "softer and rounder" sonic texture influenced the band's performances, with "the rhythm tracks ... coming back off tape a little less forcefully", the overdubs were subsequently "performed with less attitude". He also suggests that, because McCartney's bass hits on the "me" of Lennon's line "Shoot me!", only "Shoot" is easily audible on the finished recording. Ten stereo mixes were made during the process, with the first attempt marked "best". Like the rest of Abbey Road, the song was never mixed for mono.

== Commentary by band members and George Martin ==
Lennon later referred to "Come Together" as "one of my favourite Beatles tracks. It's funky, it's bluesy, and I'm singing it pretty well." Martin said of the song:

If I had to pick one song that showed the four disparate talents of the boys and the ways they combined to make a great sound, I would choose 'Come Together'. The original song is good, and with John's voice it's better. Then Paul has this idea for this great little riff. And Ringo hears that and does a drum thing that fits in, and that establishes a pattern that John leapt upon and did the ['shoot me'] part. And then there's George's guitar at the end. The four of them became much, much better than the individual components.

In May 2021, Ringo Starr said it was his favourite Beatles song in an interview on The Late Show with Stephen Colbert.

== Release and legacy ==
Apple Records, the Beatles' EMI-distributed record label, released Abbey Road on 26 September 1969, with "Come Together" sequenced as the opening track. The song was issued as a double A-side single (as Apple 2654) with Harrison's "Something" on 6 October in America. Commercially, the single was a massive success, staying on the US Billboard Hot 100 chart for 16 weeks. During the single's chart run on Billboard in the US, "Come Together" peaked at number 7 until the magazine changed its practice of counting sales and airplay separately for each song; following this change on 29 November, the single topped the Hot 100 for one week. "Come Together" / "Something" became the Beatles' eighteenth number 1 single in Billboard, surpassing Elvis Presley's record of seventeen. In the other US national charts, Record World listed "Something" / "Come Together" at number 1 for two weeks and "Come Together" / "Something" for the remaining three weeks at number 1, while in Cash Box magazine, which continued to rank each song separately, "Something" peaked at number 2 and "Come Together" spent three weeks at number 1.

"Something" / "Come Together" was released on 31 October 1969 in the UK (as Apple R5814) and the combined sides reached No. 4. There, the release was highly unusual, given the traditional preference for non-album singles. In addition, according to former Mojo editor Paul Du Noyer, "so enormous were sales of Abbey Road that demand for the single was inevitably dampened."

The first take of the song, recorded on 21 July 1969, with slightly different lyrics, was released in 1996 on the outtake compilation Anthology 3, and take five of the song was released on the Abbey Road 50th Anniversary release.

=== Contemporary reviews ===
Tony Barrow, reviewing Abbey Road for the Liverpool Echo, referred to "Come Together" as "magnificently funky" and highlighted "its intriguing lyrics". A reviewer for the Western Daily Press named "Come Together" as one of the album's best tracks, and Jack Batten of The Toronto Star noted the song's "eminently hummable little melodic riff".

=== Retrospective assessments ===
"Come Together" has frequently appeared on numerous publications' lists of the Beatles' best songs. In 2006, Mojo magazine placed it at No. 13 in their list of the Beatles' 101 best songs. Four years later, Rolling Stone ranked it No. 9 on their list of the band's 100 greatest songs. Meanwhile, Entertainment Weekly and Ultimate Classic Rock ranked it at No. 44 and No. 20, respectively. In 2015, NME and Paste placed it at No. 20 and No. 23 in their respective lists of the band's best songs.

Rolling Stone ranked "Come Together" at No. 202 on their list of the 500 Greatest Songs of All Time in 2004, re-ranking it No. 205 in the 2010 revised list. In 2024, Consequence ranked the song's bassline as the best of all time.

== Lawsuit ==
In late 1969, "Come Together" was the subject of a copyright infringement claim brought against Lennon by Big Seven Music, the publisher of Chuck Berry's "You Can't Catch Me". Morris Levy, the owner of Big Seven Music, contended that it sounded similar musically to Berry's original and shared some lyrics (Lennon sang, "Here come ol' flattop, he come groovin' up slowly", and Berry's had sung, "Here come a flattop, he was movin' up with me"). Before recording, Lennon and McCartney deliberately slowed the song down and added a heavy bass riff in order to make the song more original. The case was settled out of court in 1973, with Levy's lawyers agreeing that Lennon would compensate by recording three Big Seven songs for his next album. A brief version of "Ya Ya" with Lennon and his son Julian was released on the album Walls and Bridges in 1974. "You Can't Catch Me" and another version of "Ya Ya" were released on Lennon's 1975 album Rock 'n' Roll, but the third, "Angel Baby", remained unreleased until after Lennon's death. Levy again sued Lennon for breach of contract, and was eventually awarded $6,795.00. Lennon countersued after Levy released an album of Lennon material using tapes that were in his possession and was eventually awarded $84,912.96. The album was called Roots: John Lennon Sings the Great Rock & Roll Hits.

== Personnel ==
According to Kevin Howlett:

- John Lennon – lead and backing vocals, guitar, handclaps, tambourine
- Paul McCartney – backing vocal, bass guitar, Rhodes piano
- George Harrison – lead and rhythm guitars
- Ringo Starr – drums, maraca

== Charts ==
=== Weekly charts ===
1969–70 weekly chart performance
Chart (1969–1970)	Peak position
Australia Go-Set National Top 40 Singles	1
Austria (Ö3 Austria Top 40)	2
Belgium (Ultratop 50 Flanders)	2
Belgium (Ultratop 50 Wallonia)	1
Finland (Suomen virallinen lista)	12
Italy (Musica e dischi)	4
Netherlands (Single Top 100)	2
New Zealand (Listener)	1
Spain (Promusicae)	96
Sweden (Sverigetopplistan)	41
Switzerland (Schweizer Hitparade)	2
UK Record Retailer	9
UK Singles (Official Charts)	4
US Billboard Hot 100	1
US Cash Box Top 100	1
West Germany (GfK)	1
West Germany (Musikmarkt Hit-Parade)	3

1989 weekly chart performance
Chart (1989)	Peak position
UK Singles (Official Charts)	84

2010 weekly chart performance
Chart (2010)	Peak position
Hot Canadian Digital Song Sales (Billboard)	40
UK Singles (Official Charts)	81
US Billboard Hot 100 Recurrents	15
US Digital Song Sales (Billboard)	43

2016 weekly chart performance
Chart (2016)	Peak position
US Rock Streaming Songs (Billboard)	18

2019 weekly chart performance
Chart (2019)	Peak position
US Billboard Hot Rock Songs	6
US Rock Digital Song Sales (Billboard)	4

=== Year-end charts ===
1969 year-end chart performance
Chart (1969)	Peak position
Belgium (Ultratop Flanders)	25
Netherlands (Dutch Top 40)	70
UK Record Retailer	67
US Billboard Hot 100	85
US Cash Box Top 100	63

== Certifications and sales ==
Region	Certification	Certified units/sales
Brazil (Pro-Música Brasil)	Gold	30,000^{‡}
Denmark (IFPI Danmark)	Gold	45,000^{‡}
Italy (FIMI) sales since 2009	Platinum	70,000^{‡}
New Zealand (RMNZ)	2× Platinum	60,000^{‡}
Spain (Promusicae)	Platinum	60,000^{‡}
United Kingdom (BPI) sales since 2010	2× Platinum	1,200,000^{‡}
United States	—	1,750,000
Summaries
Worldwide original release	—	2,500,000
^{‡} Sales+streaming figures based on certification alone.

== Cover versions ==
=== Ike & Tina Turner version ===
"Come Together"
- French picture sleeve

Single by Ike & Tina Turner & the Ikettes

from the album Come Together
- B-side: "Honky Tonk Women"
- Released: December 1969
- Length: 3:37
- Label: Minit; Liberty
- Songwriter: Lennon–McCartney
- Producer: Ike Turner

Ike & Tina Turner singles chronology
"I Wanna Jump" (1969)	"Come Together" (1969)	"I Want to Take You Higher" (1970)

The Ikettes singles chronology
"Make 'Em Wait" (1968)	"Come Together" (1969)	"I Want to Take You Higher" (1970)

A month after the original version by the Beatles was released, Ike & Tina Turner began performing their rendition of "Come Together," most notably at Madison Square Garden in November 1969. Due to the public response to their live performances, Minit Records rushed the release of a studio version. The single, also credited to the Ikettes, was released in December 1969. It reached number 57 on the Billboard Hot 100 and number 21 on the Billboard R&B Singles chart. The B-side features another soul-infused rock cover, "Honky Tonk Women" by the Rolling Stones.

"Come Together" is the lead single from Ike & Tina Turner's 1970 album of the same name. The song has been released on various compilations, including Greatest Hits (1976), Proud Mary: The Best of Ike & Tina Turner (1991), and The Ike & Tina Turner Story: 1960–1975 (2007). A live version was recorded at L'Olympia in Paris on 30 January 1971, and released later that year on their live album Live in Paris.

=== John Lennon solo version ===
"Come Together" was the only Beatles song Lennon sang during his 1972 Madison Square Garden concerts. It was Lennon's only full-length concert performance after leaving the Beatles. He was backed by the band Elephant's Memory. This version of the song appears on the concert album Live in New York City, recorded on 30 August 1972 and released in 1986.

=== Aerosmith version ===
"Come Together"

Single by Aerosmith

from the album Sgt. Pepper's Lonely Hearts Club Band
- B-side: "Kings and Queens"
- Released: 31 July 1978
- Recorded: 1978
- Length: 3:46
- Label: Columbia
- Songwriter: Lennon–McCartney
- Producer: Jack Douglas

Aerosmith singles chronology
"Get It Up" (1978)	"Come Together" (1978)	"Chip Away the Stone" (1978)

Music video
- "Come Together" (audio) on YouTube

American hard rock band Aerosmith recorded one of the most successful cover versions of "Come Together" in 1978. The band performed the song in the 1978 film Sgt. Pepper's Lonely Hearts Club Band; their recording appeared on its accompanying soundtrack album. Released as a single in July 1978, Aerosmith's version was an immediate success, reaching number 23 on the Billboard Hot 100, following on the heels of a string of Top 40 hits for the band in the mid-1970s. However, it would be the last Top 40 hit for the band for nearly a decade.

Another recording of the song was released several months later on Aerosmith's live album Live! Bootleg. The song also featured on Aerosmith's Greatest Hits, the band's first singles compilation released in 1980. Their live performance from the 33rd Annual Grammy Awards ceremony was released in a Grammy compilation CD. The song has also surfaced on a number of Aerosmith compilations and live albums since then, as well as on the soundtrack for the film Armageddon.

=== Godsmack version ===
Godsmack released "Come Together" in 2012 on the Live & Inspired album. An official music video was released and the single entered the Hard Rock Charts at number 11, then in 2017 resurfaced to land at position No. 1 on Billboard's Hard Rock Digital Song Sales chart.

=== Gary Clark Jr. and Junkie XL version ===
"Come Together"

Single by Gary Clark Jr. & Junkie XL

from the album Justice League: Original Motion Picture Soundtrack
- Released: 8 September 2017
- Length: 3:13
- Label: Warner; WaterTower
- Songwriter: Lennon–McCartney
- Producer: Junkie XL

Gary Clark Jr. singles chronology
"Ride" (2017)	"Come Together" (2017)	"I'm On 3.0" (2017)

Junkie XL singles chronology
"Cities in Dust" (2008)	"Come Together" (2017)

Music video
- "Come Together" (Official Music Video) on YouTube

American musician Gary Clark Jr. and Dutch composer Junkie XL released a cover version of "Come Together" as the first single from the soundtrack of the 2017 superhero film Justice League on 8 September. A music video featuring Gary Clark Jr. on guitar and vocals interspersed with cuts of footage from the film was released on 27 October. The single reached No. 27 on the Billboard Digital Songs Sales and No. 7 on the Billboard Hot Rock & Alternative Songs.

==== Charts ====
===== Weekly charts =====
Chart (2017)	Peak position
Belgium (Ultratip Bubbling Under Wallonia)	17
US Alternative Airplay (Billboard)	39
US Digital Song Sales (Billboard)	27
US Hot Rock & Alternative Songs (Billboard)	7
US Mainstream Rock Airplay (Billboard)	15
US Rock & Alternative Airplay (Billboard)	31

=== Other versions ===
Paul McCartney recorded an updated version of "Come Together" with Noel Gallagher and Paul Weller for the 1995 charity album Help, under the name the Smokin' Mojo Filters (derived from a line in the song). Weller performed the lead vocal duties, with McCartney and Gallagher providing backing vocals, harmonies and bass and guitar. Their rendition reached No. 19 on the UK Singles Chart in December 1995.

Arctic Monkeys covered the song for the 2012 Summer Olympics opening ceremony. It was released on the album Isles of Wonder and reached No. 21 on the UK Singles Chart.

Foo Fighters, Liam Gallagher and Aerosmith's Joe Perry covered "Come Together" at the CalJam Festival in San Bernardino, California in 2017. Gallagher forgot the words during the performance, later explaining that he thought they were performing "I Am the Walrus".

Vietnamese progressive metal band Da Vàng also covered the song in S.O.S. album. It was released in 2000

== See also ==
- Come Together: A Night for John Lennon's Words and Music
