= Mama Kin =

- Label to Japanese single

Single by Aerosmith

from the album Aerosmith
- A-side: "Dream On"
- Released: January 5, 1973
- Recorded: 1972
- Genre: Hard rock
- Length: 4:26
- Label: Columbia
- Songwriter: Steven Tyler
- Producer: Adrian Barber

"Mama Kin" is a song by American hard rock band Aerosmith, which appears on their 1973 self-titled debut album. The song was written by lead singer Steven Tyler. It was a staple of Aerosmith concerts and appeared on several live albums.

== Music and lyrics ==
The song comprises a basic guitar riff, with a strong rhythm backbeat which comes in between lyrics in the verse and throughout the bridge. There are also saxophones interspersed throughout the song.

Aerosmith biographer Richard Bienstock described "Mama Kin" as an "uptempo barn-burner with a distinct glam flavor." Music historian Andrew Grant Jackson claimed that the "hyped-up pace" of the song reflected Aerosmith's "anxious youth."

Jackson described the song as "the first of Tyler's many installments about a poor gypsy's battle to find peace of mind in the face of grueling obstacles like groupies and pot, hoping he won't have to go back on the wagon and work for his dad."

The lyrics “Bald as an egg at 18, and working for your daddy’s a drag” were a reference to Aerosmith's road manager Mark Lehman.

== Reception ==
Ultimate Classic Rock critic Chad Childers rated "Mama Kin" as Aerosmith's 7th best song of the 1970s. Ultimate Classic Rock critic Michael Gallucci said that unlike most of the songs on the album, "Mama Kin" is "bursting with train-kept-a-rollin' locomotive action, even if it "sounds tentative at times, not sure if it should take that next step, and the rhythm's start-stop progression kinda breaks the flow. Gallucci also said that "Perry's guitar brims with confidence, slashing at the empty spaces like its very existence depended on it."

Aerosmith biographer Martin Huxley called "Mama Kin" an "acknowledged classic", saying that it "encapsulated all the best qualities of the band's early rhythm 'n' roll approach, with soulful accents from sessionman David Woodford's sax."

== Legacy ==
A concert version of the song helped the band land their first recording contract with Columbia Records. The song has also been a live staple of Aerosmith concerts throughout the band's career. Live versions of the song appeared on Live! Bootleg, Classics Live, A Little South of Sanity and The Road Starts Hear.

The song has also appeared on several Aerosmith compilations including Gems (1988), Pandora's Box (1991), Pandora's Toys (1995), O, Yeah! Ultimate Aerosmith Hits (2002), Greatest Hits 1973–1988 (2004), and Devil's Got a New Disguise (2006).

== Noteworthy references to the song ==
- In December 1994, the band opened up a music club called the Mama Kin Music Hall in their hometown of Boston, Massachusetts. In January 1999, Aerosmith sold its ownership interest in the club, which became known as the Landsdowne Street Music Hall.
- Steven Tyler has a tattoo on his arm with the phrase "Ma' Kin." He got it when the band was writing its first album because he had so much confidence in the song. Tyler and Perry have both said that his arm was too thin to fit the whole title.
- Shinedown references to "smokin' tea with Mama Kin" in their song "Cry for Help" on the Sound of Madness album.

== Guns N' Roses and Buckcherry versions ==
The song was covered by Guns N' Roses in 1986 and released in the same year on their EP album Live ?!*@ Like a Suicide. It was later re-released on their second studio album G N' R Lies in 1988. There's also a live version of Guns N' Roses performing the song along with Steven Tyler and Joe Perry. This was from Guns N' Roses live from Paris pay per view special.

Buckcherry also covered the song, which appeared as a bonus track on their 2014 EP Fuck. It is the only song on that album that does not use the word "fuck" in the song or have "fuck" as part of the title.

== "Mama Kin" in other media ==
"Mama Kin" is featured as a re-recorded track on the video game Guitar Hero: Aerosmith.
