= A Line in the Sand (board game) =

1991 board game

A Line in the Sand is a board game published by TSR in 1991.

== History ==
Paul Lidberg and Douglas Niles designed A Line in the Sand, which depicted the first US-Iraq War; it was one of the projects originating from TSR West, and was published the day the US bombing began thanks to Flint Dille's ability to convince the president of the company to make things move fast. The game made close to $500,000 for the company. A Line in the Sand was showcased at the 88th American International Toy Fair.

Strategic Simulations published A Line in the Sand, a computer game translation of the board game, in 1992.

== Reception ==
The Chicago Tribune said that "the best part of the game is the multiplayer rules, in which players portray the governments of Israel, Iraq, the United States, etc. The situation lends itself to treachery, back-stabbing and good clean fun."
