= A Line in the Sand (video game) =

1992 video game

- Developer: Strategic Simulations
- Publisher: Strategic Simulations
- Designer: Paul Arden Lidberg
- Platform: MS-DOS
- Release: 1992
- Genre: Computer wargame
- Mode: Single-player

A Line in the Sand is a 1992 computer wargame for MS-DOS developed and published by Strategic Simulations. It is based on the A Line in the Sand board game.

== Gameplay ==
A Line in the Sand is a computer game translation of the board game A Line in the Sand.

== Reception ==
Reception

Review score
Publication	Score
Computer Gaming World	2.5/5

The reviewer from Computer Gaming World stated: "Line is a 'beer-and-pretzels' game - or more appropriately, since alcohol is forbidden in most of the Arab world, it is a 'pretzels' game. Light entertainment that, like 'non-alcoholic' beer, simply lacks the gestalt of reality." In a 1994 survey of wargames, the magazine gave the title two-plus stars out of five, stating that it "is not an accurate representation of the Gulf War", but the other scenarios were "more interesting".
