= Rocks (Aerosmith album) =

Studio album by Aerosmith
- Released: May 13, 1976
- Recorded: February–March 1976
- Studios: Wherehouse, Waltham, MA; The Record Plant, NYC, NY
- Genres: Hard rock; heavy metal
- Length: 34:57
- Label: Columbia
- Producers: Jack Douglas; Aerosmith

Aerosmith chronology
Toys in the Attic (1975)	Rocks (1976)	Draw the Line (1977)

Singles from Rocks
- 1. "Last Child" Released: April 27, 1976; 2. "Home Tonight" Released: August 27, 1976; 3. "Back in the Saddle" Released: March 22, 1977

Rocks is the fourth studio album by American rock band Aerosmith, released on May 13, 1976, through Columbia.

AllMusic described Rocks as having "captured Aerosmith at their most raw and rocking." Rocks was ranked number 366 on the updated Rolling Stone's list of the 500 Greatest Albums of All Time in 2020. It has influenced many hard rock and heavy metal artists, including Guns N' Roses, Metallica, and Nirvana.

The album was a commercial success, charting three singles on the Billboard Hot 100, two of which reached the Top 40 ("Back in the Saddle" and "Last Child").

The album was one of the first to ship platinum when it was released, and has since gone quadruple platinum.

== Background ==
Previously, Aerosmith had recorded three albums: Aerosmith (1973), Get Your Wings (1974), and their breakthrough Toys in the Attic (1975), which produced the hits "Walk This Way" and "Sweet Emotion".

Although often derided by critics, the band had amassed a loyal fanbase from relentless touring and their ferocious live shows. Producer Douglas explains, "The only thing we were talking about a few months before Rocks was that it was going to be a real hard-rock album. And we might go back to the format of the first album, which was to rock out on every tune. And again, keep it real raw. And make it as live sounding as we possibly could."

By the time of the album's sessions, the group had already begun living the rock-and-roll lifestyle to the hilt, indulging their already considerable appetite for drugs. However, their hedonistic lifestyle did not appear to hamper them creatively; Rocks was considered by many fans, critics, and fellow musicians to be one of the highlights of their career. Guitarist Joe Perry later recalled, "There's no doubt we were doing a lot of drugs by then, but whatever we were doing, it was still working for us."

== Writing ==
In the 1997 band memoir Walk This Way, guitarist Brad Whitford states that the band began work on the album by backing the Record Plant's mobile recording truck into their rehearsal space, named the Wherehouse, and "let fly ... We were living the high life and not paying attention to anything except making this record. I had the beginnings of "Last Child" and "Nobody's Fault."

Tom had "Uncle Tom's Cabin" that became "Sick as a Dog." We had 'Tit for Tat' ... which turned into 'Rats in the Cellar.' We cut all the basic tracks except two there."

Producer Jack Douglas later insisted: Rocks was the album where Tom and Brad had a lot more input and songs ... This was a big album for Aerosmith. It had to make a big statement about how loud and hard they were, how unapologetic they felt about being who they were – this brash, rude, sexual, hard-core rock band.

The album's opening track, "Back in the Saddle" was written by Perry on six-string bass.

In 1997, Perry explained to Alan Di Perna of Guitar World that he was inspired by Peter Green to write the riff on a Fender Bass VI and admitted that he was "very high on heroin when I wrote 'Back in the Saddle.' That riff just floated right through me." He further describes it as "the kind of riff and instrumentation that falls outside the normal formula of a rock song. I wrote it on a six string bass. It was one of those songs that really opened things up for us."

Tyler explains that the song uses the "saddle image as a way of saying, 'Here's another album, folks, and we're gonna rock out and I've really got my spurs on'." He continues in his memoir, "Back in the Saddle" I hoped would be nostalgic, hearkening to the spirit of every Spaghetti Western I ever saw. The band played like the gods they were. Jack mixed it with Jay in the way you hear it today."

"Last Child" is credited to guitarist Brad Whitford and Tyler. Tyler explains, "Brad wrote, 'Take me back to sweet Tallahassee, home sweet home…'" recalled Tyler. "Whatever he put into 'Last Child', that's his moment. He can take that, and that's his, forever." The song evolved from a riff Whitford titled "Soul Saver", a recording of which was released on Pandora's Box in 1991.

"Sick as a Dog" is credited to Tyler and Tom Hamilton. The bassist explains, "I think I came up with the verse part first. And then I did the parts for the intro, the B to E part, and then came up with this little, jangling arpeggio thing ... I'm such a Byrds fan; it comes from that."

As Hamilton later remembered, it was "Mr. Tambourine Man" that was especially influential on him personally when it came to his eventual contributions to the song that became "Sick as a Dog." "It really embedded in my mind that love of hearing [guitar sounds like that], especially when it was combined with a hard rock beat.

Perry shared how they ended up dividing things up instrumentally in the studio: "Tom played rhythm guitar on "Sick as a Dog." I played bass for the first half of the song. Then I put the bass down and played guitar in the end, and Steven picked up the bass and played it for the rest of the song – all live in the studio! One take.

Hamilton remembers Douglas' assistance in developing the song: "Jack is a very open person. He always has time for what people come up with. "Sick" started on guitar and I wasn't sure about it but playing it for Jack, I realized it had a lot of potential. We recorded it last, and I'm glad because everybody was hot then."

"Rats in the Cellar" evolved from Fleetwood Mac's "Rattlesnake Shake", a staple of the band's early setlists. In his memoir, Tyler states that the title "Rats in the Cellar" is a "tip of the hat, or an answer to 'Toys in the Attic' ... Meanwhile, in real life, 'Rats' was more like what was actually going on. Things were coming apart, sanity was scurrying south, caution was flung to the winds, and little by little the chaos was permanently moving in."

"Nobody's Fault" remains a favorite of the band's, with Tyler calling it "one of the highlights of my creative career" and Kramer insisting "it's some of the best drumming I did." According to Tyler, the lyrics: "have to do with earthquakes, which we were scared of, along with flying".

"Lick and a Promise" is about the band's determination to deliver a rocking live show.

"Combination" features Perry sharing lead vocal duties with Tyler for the first time, and the guitarist admitted in 1997 that the song was "about heroin, cocaine, and me". In his memoir, Tyler calls the line "Walkin' on Gucci wearing Yves St. Laurent/Barely stay on 'cause I'm so goddamn gaunt" the best lyric Perry ever wrote: "It was the truth, it was clever, and it described us to a tee".

Regarding his vocal on the song, Perry later commented, "This was touchy because singing was Steven's jealously guarded territory ... Beyond that, anytime the spotlight shone on me I detected a bit of jealousy from the other guys. After a while, though, the band came around and supported me, as long as I sang the song as a semi-duet with Steven."

"Home Tonight" features Tyler on piano, Perry on a lap steel guitar as a lead guitar and his Les Paul for the rhythm guitar, and has drummer Joey Kramer, Tom Hamilton, and producer/arranger Jack Douglas performing backing vocals. Of the song Perry recalled, "Steven could always be counted on to come up with some little piano riff that would be our ballad for the record. And that was it."

== Recording ==
Unlike their previous two records, which were recorded at the Record Plant studios in Manhattan, for Rocks, the group rented a rehearsal space in suburban Massachusetts, the Wherehouse and employed a mobile studio to cut the record. Backing tracks for six of the songs were completed at the Wherehouse.

Douglas explains: "It's the one record, of all the records that I've done, where every element is right and in its place. Every lyric, every key, every sound. Everything is right about that record, for what it is. Because it was written and conceived and recorded in the same place, in A. Wherehouse in Waltham, Mass. So we had the place where they used to rehearse. It was done in the dead of winter, and they would come in to record with nothing but a few licks...and we would develop these tunes."

He continues, "we cut all the basics at their rehearsal space, the Wherehouse, in Boston's suburbs. A big, metal, roaring, huge room. I used stage monitors in with them to blow the sound right back at them. And that's when they started to stretch out. Joe would ask what he ought to be listening to and I'd hip him to John Coltrane for solo ideas - and he'd try to get that! Even in pre-production, I knew it was great. I have cassettes of the evolution of every song on that record, and you should hear "Back In The Saddle" as it evolved from Joe's basic lick to the monster it became. Wanna know what the secret to Rocks was? Distortion. Everything is totally over-loaded. When I brought it to the record company, they panicked at first, but not for long."

At the end of February 1976, the band resumed sessions at the Record Plant to complete the remaining backing tracks and record vocals for the album.

Writing lyrics for the songs proved to be the most difficult stage in the album's production. Douglas explains, "Steven moves in with me when we're working on an album. In the morning, I wake him up with a cassette and a cup of coffee; most of the melody lines have all been worked out and he's singing phonetically. I'll suggest a thing to him here and there, give him a kick this way and he starts to come around. He's really the main drive of the band"

"Back in the Saddle" features the sound of a whip by whirling a thirty-foot cord in the middle of six Neumann mikes and adding a cap gun for the cracking sound effect. A real bullwhip was intended to be used for the whip effects and hours were spent trying to get it to crack.

The band members ended up cut up and hurt without making any progress. The first verse features the sound of clinking spurs, which was actually produced using bells and tambourines strapped to Tyler's cowboy boots by Perry and New York Dolls singer David Johansen.

The song is also notable for the slow buildup of the drum beat and guitar riff in the beginning of the song, as well as the sound effects of a galloping horse.

Tyler achieved the hoofbeat sound using coconuts from a percussion kit he ordered from SIR Studio Instrument Rentals.

Producer Douglas acknowledges the pervasiveness of drug use during the album's sessions: "Labels were giving them drugs. It was written into the project, and in the case of Columbia, they had guys who delivered it to you. And they finally got busted for that, people lost their jobs and it became a huge scandal. Columbia Records: If they could keep you doing coke, then the records would get done faster. That was their philosophy. And you know, for those guys, they did quite a bit. But then you gotta come down, and you gotta find something to come down with. So it's either pills or heroin. So through Toys, everything was fine, it was working. Rocks, that's a pretty drug-fueled record, but it was really working. It was a dark record, too."

Bassist Tom Hamilton remembers the dangers, "There is something about being high that makes you look at things differently. But that period for some people can be relatively short. I think [drugs] all gave us energy and concentration. It was beneficial for a while. But in a few years it became so destructive. It was just so awful. We worked hard to be able to play with feelings and really tight, and then after Rocks, it fell apart. We started making a lot of money, and that was the beginning of the end."

Douglas expresses his satisfaction with the album's production and sound: "Rocks was done in Waltham, Massachusetts, in a warehouse. The keys the songs were written in were all dependent on the environment we were in. After a couple of weeks of rehearsal, the room started to sound really good. The very thought of moving it out of that room seemed like it would destroy everything about where we were. It was 100 percent written in the room—not including the lyrics because the lyrics always came last—but Steven's melodies. That record, when I put it on, sounds like truth. To this day, I still feel that that album is closest to a really true statement and it was because the environment in which it was written was the same environment in which it was recorded."

Perry remembers, "With Rocks we had more confidence. We still had to write stuff on the spot, but that was the one where we had more of a handle on the creativity. Not to say that the pressure wasn't on. We were touring constantly, we only took time off to go in the studio. No one said: 'Take a month off, go write some songs.' It was like: 'Go in the studio with whatever ideas you have.' That was how it was. Toys was kind of the softball album, and Rocks was the one were we felt: 'Wow, we're there'."

== Reception and legacy ==
Professional ratings
Review scores
Source	Rating
AllMusic	5/5 stars
Blender	5/5 stars
Collector's Guide to Heavy Metal	10/10
The Encyclopedia of Popular Music	4/5 stars
The Rolling Stone Album Guide	4.5/5 stars
Uncut	5/5 stars
The Village Voice	A−

Contemporary reviews were mixed. John Milward of Rolling Stone wrote that "the material is Rocks’ major flaw, mostly pale remakes of their earlier hits"; concluding that the return to the "ear-boxing sound" of Get Your Wings and Tyler's vocal performance cannot save the album from mediocrity.

In The Village Voice, Robert Christgau wrote that Aerosmith were doing a good job of imitating Led Zeppelin, and that after this album the band began to lose steam.

Modern reviews are very positive. Greg Prato of AllMusic describes Rocks as "a superb follow-up to their masterwork Toys in the Attic" that captures "Aerosmith at their most raw and rocking". He writes that "Back in the Saddle and Last Child are among their most renowned songs, but all the tracks prove essential to the makeup of the album".

Ben Mitchell of Blender said that the members' drug use actually helped Rocks. He also called the album "raw."

On November 24, 1994, Los Angeles Times review of Rocks, Jon Matsumoto opined that the record "arguably is the best heavy metal opus ever concocted".

Canadian journalist Martin Popoff described the album as "a screamin' mercury-shattering rock festival, live, overblown, decadent, and very American", concluding that "on Rocks the band's talent is anything but wasted."

Many musicians have cited Rocks as a favorite:

- Rocks was one of Kurt Cobain's favorite albums, as he listed in his Journals.
- In 2003, the album was ranked number 176 on Rolling Stone magazine's list of The 500 Greatest Albums of All Time, maintaining the rating in a 2012 revised list, before it was dropped to 366 in a 2020 revised list.
- Mötley Crüe songwriter and bassist Nikki Sixx refers to Aerosmith frequently in his book The Heroin Diaries.
- Metallica leader James Hetfield has identified Rocks, as well as Aerosmith, as important influences in his music, stating that the band was the reason why he wanted to learn guitar.
- Slash says Rocks was the album that inspired him to learn guitar, and that the album changed his life:

I was in seventh grade and just going through the whole 1978 music thing that was happening for kids – which was like Cheap Trick and the Cars. Anyway, there was this chick that I was going after that was considerably older than me ... I'd been trying to be cool enough to take her out and have my way with her ... Finally, I sort of weaseled my way into her apartment. So we're hanging out and she put Rocks by Aerosmith on, and I was mesmerised by it. It was like the be-all-and-end-all, best-attitude, fuckin' hard rock record ... I'd grown up with music, but this was like my record. I must have listened to it about half a dozen times, completely ignored her, and then got on my bike and rode. I was totally in there. I was at least gonna get a decent French kiss out of it, and I completely dropped the ball for Aerosmith, and that was that. It's probably one of the records that sums up my taste in hard rock bands to this day. Meanwhile, she's out there somewhere and I missed it. But it was worth it.

In his autobiography Rocks, Joe Perry states the driving purpose of Rocks "was to reidentify us as America's ultimate garage band, with blistering guitars, blistering vocals, balls-to-the-wall smash-your-eardrums production ... The cover showed five diamonds, one for each of us. We saw that record as a jewel, the culmination of all our angst and anger and excitement and joy as go-for-broke rock and rollers."

== Track listing ==
All credits adapted from the original LP.

Side one
No.	Title	Writer(s)	Length
1.	"Back in the Saddle"	Steven Tyler, Joe Perry	4:40
2.	"Last Child"	Tyler, Brad Whitford	3:27
3.	"Rats in the Cellar"	Tyler, Perry	4:02
4.	"Combination"	Perry	3:42

Side two
No.	Title	Writer(s)	Length
1.	"Sick as a Dog"	Tyler, Tom Hamilton	4:25
2.	"Nobody's Fault"	Tyler, Whitford	4:40
3.	"Get the Lead Out"	Tyler, Perry	3:42
4.	"Lick and a Promise"	Tyler, Perry	3:04
5.	"Home Tonight"	Tyler	3:15
Total length:			34:57

== Personnel ==
All credits adapted from the original LP.

Aerosmith

- Steven Tyler — vocals, bass guitar on "Sick as a Dog" (outro only), piano on "Home Tonight"
- Joe Perry — guitars, vocals, six-string bass on "Back in the Saddle", bass guitar on "Sick as a Dog", co-lead vocals on "Combination", lap steel guitar on "Home Tonight"
- Brad Whitford — guitars (except "Sick as a Dog")
- Tom Hamilton — bass guitar (except "Sick as a Dog"), guitar on "Sick as a Dog", backing vocals on "Home Tonight"
- Joey Kramer — drums, percussion, backing vocals on "Home Tonight"

Additional musician

- Paul Prestopino – banjo on "Last Child"

Production

- Jack Douglas – producer, arrangements, backing vocals on "Home Tonight"
- Aerosmith – production, arrangements
- Jay Messina – engineer
- David Hewitt – remote truck director
- Rod O'Brien – assistant engineer
- Sam Ginsburg – assistant engineer
- Pacific Eye & Ear – album design

== Charts ==
Chart (1976)	Peak position
Australian Albums (Kent Music Report)	45
Canada Top Albums/CDs (RPM)	14
Japanese Albums (Oricon)	13
Swedish Albums (Sverigetopplistan)	46
US Billboard 200	3

== Certifications ==
Region	Certification	Certified units/sales
Australia (ARIA)	Gold	35,000^{^}
Japan (RIAJ)	Gold	100,000^{^}
Canada (Music Canada)	Platinum	100,000^{^}
United States (RIAA)	4× Platinum	4,000,000^{^}
^{^} Shipments figures based on certification alone.

=== Bibliography ===
- Davis, Stephen; Aerosmith (October 1, 1997). Walk This Way: The Autobiography of Aerosmith. New York City: Avon Books. ISBN 978-0-380-97594-5.
- Huxley, Martin (2015). Aerosmith: The Fall and the Rise of Rock's Greatest Band. St. Martin's Publishing Group. ISBN 978-1250096531.
- Perry, Joe; Ritz, David (October 7, 2014). Rocks: My Life In and Out of Aerosmith. New York City: Simon & Schuster. ISBN 978-1-476-71454-7.
- Tyler, Steven; Dalton, David (May 3, 2011). Does the Noise in My Head Bother You?: A Rock 'n' Roll Memoir. New York City: Ecco Press. ISBN 978-0-061-76789-0.
