= Chip Away the Stone =

Song by Aerosmith

Single by Aerosmith

from the album Live! Bootleg
- B-side: 1. "S.O.S. (Too Bad)" (Live version); 2. "Chip Away the Stone" (Live version)
- Released: December 8, 1978; 1989 (re-issue)
- Recorded: April 8, 1978 at Santa Monica; June 4, 1978 at Long View Farms
- Genre: Hard rock; country rock
- Length: 4:02
- Label: Columbia
- Songwriter: Richard Supa
- Producer: Jack Douglas

Aerosmith singles chronology
"Come Together" (1978)	"Chip Away the Stone" (1978)	"Remember (Walking in the Sand)" (1980)

Music video
- "Chip Away the Stone" on YouTube

"Chip Away the Stone" is a song performed by American hard rock band Aerosmith. Written by Richie Supa, a friend and sometime collaborator with the band, it was released in 1978 as the only single to support the band's live album Live! Bootleg. It also appeared on the Cal Jam II live album, despite being the same recording from Live! Bootleg at Santa Monica. The lyrics describe the narrator's attempt to seduce a beautiful woman who is "actin' like a prima donna [and] playin' so hard to get", and who is attracting the attention of men who compete for her attention: "while the boys all promenade."

The live version that appears on Live! Bootleg was recorded in Santa Monica on April 8, 1978. The single also featured a studio version of the track, which was recorded at Long View Farm studio in Massachusetts on June 4, 1978, with the single's B-side being live versions of both "Chip Away the Stone" and "S.O.S. (Too Bad)" from their 1974 album Get Your Wings. The front and back cover of Night in the Ruts come from a photoshoot originally intended for the cover of this single. "Chip Away the Stone" peaked at #77 on the Billboard Hot 100 in 1978, breaking the band's run of Top-40 charting singles in the United States at the time.

The song was also included on the albums Gems in 1988 (studio version - its first appearance on an Aerosmith album), Pandora's Box in 1991 (alternate studio version), and Greatest Hits 1973–1988 in 2004. Live video is also featured on Aerosmith Video Scrapbook. The song re-charted in 1988 at #13 on the Mainstream Rock Tracks chart, when it was included on the collection Gems, 10 years after its initial release. The 1989 single contains the original studio version of "S.O.S (Too Bad)" as the B side.

The song was a regular part of the setlist in Aerosmith concerts in 1978, but only occasionally played live after that year.

35 years after its release, Steven Tyler and Joe Perry performed this song with Randy Jackson and members of the house band on The Tonight Show with Jay Leno on January 20, 2012.

== Music video ==
A music video, directed by Arnold Levine, was produced to promote the original single. A different video, consisting of excerpts from Aerosmith concerts over the years, was produced ten years later to promote the Gems album in 1988.

== Cover versions ==
Humble Pie covered the song on their 1981 album Go for the Throat.

New Bomb Turks covered the song on their 2003 album Switchblade Tongues, Butterknife Brains.

Vince Neil, Blues Saraceno, Ricky Phillips, Pat Torpey and Paul Taylor covered the song for the Aerosmith tribute album Not the Same Old Song and Dance (Eagle Records, 1999). Backing vocals were by David Glen Eisley.

The Hot Club of Cowtown did a tongue-in-cheek country-style version on their 2002 album Ghost Train.

Guns N' Roses covered part of the song during their Up Close and Personal Tour.

RagDolls, an all female Aerosmith tribute band, performed the song as part of their set during their premier performance in October 2020.
