= Nobody's Fault (Aerosmith song) =

Song by Aerosmith

from the album Rocks
- Released: May 14, 1976
- Genre: Heavy metal
- Length: 4:25
- Label: Columbia
- Songwriter(s): Steven Tyler; Brad Whitford
- Producer(s): Aerosmith; Jack Douglas

"Nobody's Fault" is a song by American hard rock band Aerosmith. It is the sixth track on Aerosmith's fourth studio album Rocks, released in 1976. It was written by guitarist Brad Whitford and lead singer Steven Tyler. Whitford often cites it as his favorite Aerosmith song.

== Background ==
The song is highlighted by a heavy backbeat of drums and bass by Joey Kramer and Tom Hamilton, as well as the soaring lead guitar of Brad Whitford, and loud singing with a serious tone by Steven Tyler. According to Tyler, the lyrics: "have to do with earthquakes, which we were scared of, along with flying". Kramer considers his work in this song to be some of his best.

== Legacy ==
"Nobody's Fault" is often cited as one of the heaviest songs Aerosmith has ever recorded, and many musicians regard it highly. Guns N' Roses guitarist Slash and James Hetfield of Metallica both consider it one of their favorite Aerosmith songs. Additionally, Kurt Cobain mentioned the song as a favorite in his journal.

== Cover versions ==
Thrash metal band Testament covered this song on their 1988 album, The New Order. A humorous music video was filmed for this version featuring Testament's rhythm guitarist Eric Peterson annoying his bandmates by constantly filming them with his personal videocamera in the opening sequence.

Southern Metal band Jackyl did a cover of the song on their 1998 album, Stayin' Alive.

Glam metal band L.A. Guns contributed a cover of the song for their 2004 covers album Rips the Covers Off.

Mötley Crüe frontman Vince Neil covered this song on his 2010 solo album Tattoos & Tequila.

Rock artist Madysin Hatter recorded an acoustic cover of the song in 2017 featuring Rob Bailey, with a 2020 follow up "one-shot" music video.

== Uses in other media ==
The song is featured in the 2008 video game Guitar Hero: Aerosmith.
