= Sgt. Pepper's Lonely Hearts Club Band (soundtrack) =

Soundtrack album by various artists
- Released: 17 July 1978
- Recorded: September 1977 – May 1978
- Studios: Cherokee, Los Angeles; Northstar, Boulder, CO; Record Plant, New York City; Abbey Road, London; Air, London
- Genres: Glam rock, pop, disco, hard rock
- Length: 83:08
- Labels: RSO, A&M (UK/Canada)
- Producers: George Martin, Maurice White, Jack Douglas

Singles from Sgt. Pepper's Lonely Hearts Club Band
- 1. "Got to Get You into My Life" Released: 14 July 1978; 2. "Come Together" Released: 31 July 1978; 3. "Sgt. Pepper's Lonely Hearts Club Band/With a Little Help from My Friends" Released: 14 August 1978; 4. "Oh! Darling" Released: August 1978; 5. "Get Back" Released: October 1978; 6. "A Day in the Life" Released: November 1978

Sgt. Pepper's Lonely Hearts Club Band is a double album produced by George Martin, featuring covers of songs by the Beatles. It was released in July 1978 by RSO Records as the soundtrack to the film Sgt. Pepper's Lonely Hearts Club Band, which starred the Bee Gees, Peter Frampton and Steve Martin.

The album debuted at No. 7 on the Billboard 200 and remained at No. 5 for six weeks. It also spawned three hit singles: Earth, Wind & Fire's "Got to Get You into My Life", Aerosmith's "Come Together" and Robin Gibb's "Oh! Darling". Despite this, the album was deemed a commercial and critical failure, with over four million copies being returned to distributors and thousands more destroyed by RSO, who experienced a financial loss after its release. It is considered to be one of the worst albums ever made.

== Overview ==
The project was managed by the Robert Stigwood Organisation (RSO). In 1975, the original plans for the album were suspended due to a dispute between Columbia and RSO. RSO invested $12 million into this soundtrack and the profit offset set against costs such as $1 million for promotion. The creation of the soundtrack was marked with tension from the beginning, with Frampton and the Bee Gees both feeling wary of the other artist as well as being unsure as to how their music would work together on the same album.

The release made history as being the first record to "return platinum", with over four million copies of it taken off store shelves and shipped back to distributors. Hundreds of thousands of copies of the album ended up being destroyed by RSO. The company itself experienced a considerable financial loss and the Bee Gees as a group had their musical reputation tarnished, though other involved bands such as Aerosmith were unscathed in terms of their popularity.

The album has been released on compact disc. Despite being performed primarily by the Bee Gees, it and the Staying Alive soundtrack remained the property of Universal Music when the band gained control of its catalogue.

== Critical reception ==
Professional ratings
Review scores
Source	Rating
AllMusic	1/5 stars
Encyclopedia of Popular Music	1/5 stars
The Rolling Stone Record Guide	0/5 stars
The Village Voice	D+

In a contemporary review for The Village Voice, music critic Robert Christgau gave the album a D+ rating with an added "Must to Avoid" warning. He wrote that, apart from the Earth, Wind & Fire and Aerosmith songs, "most of the arrangements are lifted whole without benefit of vocal presence (maybe Maurice should try hormones) or rhythmic integrity ('Can't we get a little of that disco feel in there, George?')" Writing in The Rolling Stone Record Guide in 1983, Dave Marsh dismissed the soundtrack as an "utter travesty" and "[e]asily the worst album of any notoriety in this book." Marsh identified Aerosmith's "Come Together" and Earth, Wind & Fire's "Got to Get You into My Life" as the only competent renditions and concluded: "Two million people bought this album, which proves that P.T. Barnum was right and that euthanasia may have untapped possibilities." The album was named the "worst ever" on Maxim's April 2000 list of pop albums from the 1970s to 1990s.

In a retrospective review, Stephen Thomas Erlewine of AllMusic said the album suffers from clumsy performances by the Bee Gees, Frankie Howerd and Peter Frampton, as well as performers who were poorly suited to their song, including Steve Martin, George Burns and Alice Cooper. He added that the soundtrack has become "a legend in its own right", due to its unenviable reputation, and that, while it has attracted a cult following, "there's no erasing the fact that this is an absolutely atrocious record".

== Commercial performance and fallout ==
Sgt. Pepper's Lonely Hearts Club Band debuted at number 7 on the U.S. Billboard album chart and stayed at number 5 for six weeks. Although there was reported resistance to the interpretation of the Beatles' songs, such as Martin's comedic take on "Maxwell's Silver Hammer", Earth, Wind & Fire's version of "Got to Get You into My Life" became a million selling single, while Robin Gibb's "Oh! Darling" and Aerosmith's version of "Come Together" both charted in the top 40.

Radio airplay trailed off when the film was released with poor reviews, only five weeks later. The album immediately dropped out of the top 100 and pre-sale shipments to the USA failed to sell in the quantities predicted. Owing to low box office receipts, the film failed to make back its production costs, but profits from the soundtrack album and the successful singles it spawned later covered those losses.

The Bee Gees blamed their declining popularity in part on their involvement with the whole project, coupled with their mutual struggles with drug addiction. The latter was exacerbated by the environment of making the film and its soundtrack, with Maurice Gibb expressing shock at seeing crew members carrying around bags full of cocaine. Robin Gibb in particular spent much of this period having to dose himself with barbiturates to even be able to sleep. Some of the most vicious criticism of the soundtrack was leveled at them, and the musicians felt a particularly painful sting at being labeled as mere "Beatles imitators" since that sort of pejorative tag had been with them since they began their pop rock work in the 1960s. (Although the Bee Gees would continue to be very popular into 1979, that year's backlash against disco, a genre in which the band had made their biggest impact, marred their careers for the next eight years.)

George Martin had agreed to become involved in the project due partly to the amount of money offered for his services, and to his wife's suggestion that any other producer might afford the songs less respect than they were due. The selections by Earth Wind & Fire and Aerosmith were the only tracks he did not work on. According to author Robert Rodriguez, Martin later rued his involvement in Sgt. Pepper.

== Track listing ==
All tracks are written by John Lennon and Paul McCartney, except "Here Comes the Sun", by George Harrison.

Side one
No.	Title	Artist(s)	Length
1.	"Sgt. Pepper's Lonely Hearts Club Band" "With a Little Help from My Friends"	Bee Gees, Paul Nicholas; Peter Frampton, Bee Gees	4:42
2.	"Here Comes the Sun"	Sandy Farina	3:05
3.	"Getting Better"	Peter Frampton, Bee Gees	2:46
4.	"Lucy in the Sky with Diamonds"	Dianne Steinberg, Stargard	3:41
5.	"I Want You (She's So Heavy)"	Bee Gees, Steinberg, Nicholas, Donald Pleasence, Stargard	6:31

Side two
No.	Title	Artist(s)	Length
1.	"Good Morning Good Morning"	Nicholas, Frampton, Bee Gees	1:58
2.	"She's Leaving Home"	Bee Gees, Jay MacIntosh, John Wheeler	2:40
3.	"You Never Give Me Your Money"	Nicholas, Steinberg	3:07
4.	"Oh! Darling"	Robin Gibb, Bee Gees	3:29
5.	"Maxwell's Silver Hammer"	Steve Martin & Chorus	4:00
6.	"Polythene Pam" "She Came in Through the Bathroom Window" "Nowhere Man" "Sgt. Pepper's Lonely Hearts Club Band (Reprise)"	Bee Gees Frampton, Bee Gees; Bee Gees Frampton, Bee Gees	5:11

Side three
No.	Title	Artist(s)	Length
1.	"Got to Get You into My Life"	Earth, Wind & Fire	3:36
2.	"Strawberry Fields Forever"	Sandy Farina	3:31
3.	"When I'm Sixty-Four"	Frankie Howerd, Farina	2:40
4.	"Mean Mr. Mustard"	Howerd	2:39
5.	"Fixing a Hole"	George Burns	2:25
6.	"Because"	Alice Cooper, Bee Gees	2:45
7.	"Golden Slumbers" "Carry That Weight"	Frampton; Bee Gees	3:24

Side four
No.	Title	Artist(s)	Length
1.	"Come Together"	Aerosmith	3:46
2.	"Being for the Benefit of Mr. Kite!"	Maurice Gibb, Frampton, Burns, Bee Gees	3:12
3.	"The Long and Winding Road"	Frampton	3:40
4.	"A Day in the Life"	Barry Gibb, Bee Gees	5:11
5.	"Get Back"	Billy Preston	2:56
6.	"Sgt. Pepper's Lonely Hearts Club Band (Finale)"	The Cast	2:13
Total length:			83:08

== Personnel ==
Credits adapted from LP liner notes.

Musicians

- Max Middleton – keyboards, synthesizer
- Robert Ahwai – guitars
- Wilbur Bascomb – bass guitar
- Bernard Purdie – drums, percussion
- George Martin – additional keyboards
- Peter Frampton – guitar solos
- Tower of Power horn section:
  - Greg Adams – trumpet
  - Emilio Castillo – tenor sax
  - Mick Gillette – trombone, trumpet
  - Steve Doc Kupka – baritone sax
  - Lenny Pickett – tenor sax, synthesizer
- Jeff Beck – guitar
- Larry Carlton – guitar
- Ricky Hitchcock – guitar
- Ray Russell – guitar
- Freddie Tackett – guitar
- Clive Chapman – bass guitar
- David Hungate – bass guitar
- David Paich – keyboards
- David Dowell – drums
- Jeff Porcaro – drums
- Tommy Reilly – harmonica
- Francis Monkman – Moog synthesizer
- Ray Cooper – percussion
- Victor Feldman – percussion
- Bee Gees – vocals for special effects ("She's Leaving Home")

Technical

- George Martin – producer, arranger (except "Got to Get You Into My Life"), co-producer ("Come Together")
- Maurice White – producer ("Got to Get You into My Life")
- Jack Douglas – co-producer ("Come Together")
- Harry Bluestone – orchestra leader
- Gavyn Wright – orchestra leader
- Geoff Emerick – engineer
- Anthony D'Amico – assistant engineer
- Nigel Walker – assistant engineer
- John Golden – mastering
- Glenn Ross – art direction
- Tim Bryant – album design (Gribbitt!)
- Paul Gross – album design (Gribbitt!)
- Tom Nikosey – logo design
- Susan Herr – logo design

== Singles ==
- "Come Together" – Aerosmith: Reached No. 23 on the Billboard Hot 100.
- "Get Back" – Billy Preston: Reached No. 86 on the Billboard Hot 100.
- "Got to Get You into My Life" – Earth, Wind & Fire: Reached No. 9 on the Billboard Hot 100 and No. 1 on U.S. R&B charts.
- "Oh! Darling" – Robin Gibb: Reached No. 15 on the Billboard Hot 100.
- ''Sgt. Pepper's Lonely Hearts Club Band/With A Little Help From My Friends'' – Bee Gees, Paul Nicholas & Peter Frampton: Released in international markets (such as the UK and Europe) without managing to enter the Billboard Hot 100.
- ''A Day in the Life'' – Barry Gibb: It had a limited promotional release in some European countries, but went unnoticed on the charts.

== Charts ==
=== Weekly charts ===
Chart (1978)	Peak position
Australian Albums (Kent Music Report)	13
Dutch Albums (Album Top 100)	14
German Albums (Offizielle Top 100)	29
New Zealand Albums (RMNZ)	2
Norwegian Albums (VG-lista)	18
Swedish Albums (Sverigetopplistan)	34
UK Albums (Official Charts)	38
US Billboard 200	5

=== Year-end charts ===
Chart (1978)	Position
New Zealand Albums (RMNZ)	38

== Certifications ==
Region	Certification	Certified units/sales
United Kingdom (BPI)	Silver	60,000^{^}
United States (RIAA)	Platinum	1,000,000^{^}
^{^} Shipments figures based on certification alone.

== See also ==
- Sgt. Pepper's Lonely Hearts Club Band (film)
- The Robert Stigwood Organisation
- Bee Gees discography
- List of music considered the worst
