= Draw the Line (Aerosmith album) =

1977 studio album by Aerosmith

- Cover art by Al Hirschfeld

Studio album by Aerosmith
- Released: December 9, 1977
- Recorded: June–October 1977
- Studios: The Cenacle, Armonk, New York; Record Plant, New York City
- Genre: Hard rock
- Length: 35:14
- Label: Columbia
- Producers: Jack Douglas; Aerosmith

Aerosmith chronology
Rocks (1976)	Draw the Line (1977)	Night in the Ruts (1979)

Singles from Draw the Line
- 1. "Draw the Line" Released: 7 October 1977; 2. "Kings and Queens" Released: 21 February 1978; 3. "Get It Up" Released: 6 April 1978

Draw the Line is the fifth studio album by American hard rock band Aerosmith, released on December 9, 1977. It was recorded between June–October in an abandoned convent near New York City. The portrait of the band on the album cover was drawn by the celebrity caricaturist Al Hirschfeld.

== Background ==
By 1977, Aerosmith had released four studio albums, the two most recent – Toys in the Attic (1975) and Rocks (1976) – catapulting the band to stardom. However, as the band began recording its next album, Draw the Line, their excessive lifestyle, combined with constant touring and drug use, began to take its toll. "Draw the Line was untogether because we weren't a cohesive unit anymore," guitarist Joe Perry admitted in the Stephen Davis band memoir Walk This Way. "We were drug addicts dabbling in music, rather than musicians dabbling in drugs."

Although the LP would sell well more than a million copies in fewer than six weeks after its release, in 2014 Perry would refer to it as "the beginning of the end" and "the decay of our artistry."

== Writing ==
In March 1977, the band and producer Jack Douglas set up camp at a haunted mansion called The Cenacle. They would spend three months writing inside the manor.

Largely due to their drug consumption, both Tyler and Perry were not as involved in the writing and recording as they had been on previous albums. According to Perry: "A lot of people had input into that record because Steven and I had stopped giving a fuck. "Draw the Line," "I Want To Know Why," and "Get It Up" were the only things Steven and I wrote together. Tom, Joey and Steven came up with "Kings and Queens," and Brad played rhythm and lead. Brad and Steven wrote "The Hand That Feeds," which I didn't even play on because I'd stayed in bed the day they recorded it and Brad played great on it anyway.

For his part, Tyler has maintained that it was the band's lethargy, not his, that slowed his progress, because "I wasn't Patti Smith writing poetry. I write exactly to the music, and when the music ain't coming, neither were the lyrics." However, Tyler confessed to Alan di Perna of Guitar World in April 1997, "What I specifically remember was not being present in the studio because I was so stoned. In the past, I always had to be there and hear every note that was going down – who was playing what and were they out of tune ... I just didn't care anymore."

In his autobiography Rocks, Perry admits that he had misplaced a cookie tin full of demos for the band that he had prepared in his basement studio, irritating Douglas, but they were eventually found by Perry's wife Elyssa: "Among those tapes was not only the fully realized "Bright Light Fright," but tracks that led to other songs like "I Want To Know Why," "Get It Up" and "Draw the Line," the title tune. Something I'd started with David Johansen became "Sight for Sore Eyes." But the lyrics literally took months for Steven to write, and by then we were back at the Record Plant in New York."

Of "Draw the Line", Tyler later recalled, "Joe had this lick on a six-string bass that was so definitive, the song just about wrote itself. It reached down my neck and grabbed the lyrics out of my throat." Tyler explains the meaning of the lyrics "Carrie...was a wet-nap winner": "Well, a wet-nap is something that you wipe babies' asses with. Back in the day, if you were lucky enough to grab a stewardess on a plane and you came out of the bathroom, all you had to clean up with was a wet-nap. The best lyrics are like the scrambled eggs you have in your head about a situation. And I've got this uncanny way of weaving shit together. To be honest, in everyday dealings, I'll talk to people, and they go, "What the fuck are you talking about?"

Producer Jack Douglas wrote the lyrics to "Critical Mass" about a dream he had during the sessions. He explains, "The lyrics to "Critical Mass" came from a dream I had at the Cenacle. I never expected Steven to record it, but he didn't have anything else, so he used my lyrics as written."

"Get It Up" features Karen Lawrence, singer of the band L.A. Jets, on the chorus. David Krebs later stated that he felt Tyler's lyrics on songs like "Get It Up" did not help the album's standing among Aerosmith fans: "The essence of Aerosmith had always been a positive and very macho sexuality, total unashamed, a little sleazy ... They didn't want to hear lyrics like 'Get It Up,' which repeated over and over again, Can't get it up' ... The negative lyrics were a big problem."

Perry performs lead vocals on his solo composition "Bright Light Fright", which was inspired by the Sex Pistols. He remembers a lukewarm reception when he presented the song to the band: They "didn't like it. I said, 'Do you want to do it or not?' They said no."

Douglas had difficulty completing "Kings and Queens". He remembers, "with "Kings and Queens," Steven and I wrote the lyrics together, which was like pulling teeth. In his memoir, Tyler writes that the song's lyrics were inspired by a "medieval fantasy" that featured "a stoned-out rock star in his tattered satin rags lying on the ancient stone floor of a castle - slightly mad, but still capable of conjuring up a revolutionary album that would astound the ears of the ones who heard it and make the critics cringe." He continues in the Pandora's Box liner notes: "This one was just about how many people died from holy wars because of their beliefs or non-beliefs. With that one, my brain was back with the knights of the round table..." Drummer Joey Kramer remembers recording "Kings and Queens" at a "typical session at the Cenacle. It was recorded in the chapel with the pews out, the drums on the altar. Jack was in the confessional, hitting the snare drum by himself." Jack Douglas plays the mandolin on the track.

"Sight for Sore Eyes" originated during the sessions for David Johansen's first solo album. Joe Perry plays on two tracks on the solo debut by the New York Dolls singer.

The album concludes with an Elvis Presley cover, Kokomo Arnold's "Milk Cow Blues". The group frequently played the song live earlier in the decade, with Perry on vocals.

== Recording ==
Producer Jack Douglas, who had started producing the band with Get Your Wings in 1974, expressed similar feelings about the apathy that permeated the recording sessions: "So I started Draw the Line, and for a while gave it my all. But because they were half-hearted about the record, I was too. Steven wasn't writing at all." He continues, "I was working on Draw the Line, which was approaching the end of Aerosmith's inspiration. It was just too much road, not enough time to write, too much excess. Too much money! I mean when you've got two weeks off and you're told to go write songs for your next album, and you've got all this money, you're gonna want to go out and have some fun, not sit at home banging out notes and words. I had to go out on a world tour with Aerosmith, just to finish it. Everytime they were near a studio, I'd pull them in to finish up the record."

Between attempts at recording at the Wherehouse and additional sessions during their Summer 1977 tour of North America and Europe, the group moved into the Cenacle, a de-consecrated monastery in Westchester County, New York in March 1977. According to Tyler's autobiography, manager David Krebs suggested that the band record its next album at the estate near Armonk, New York "away from the temptation of drugs." The plan failed miserably, however, with Tyler recalling, "Drugs can be imported, David ... we have our resources. Dealers deliver! Hiding us away in a three hundred room former convent was a prescription for total lunacy." Perry remembers the setting: "The Cenacle included sixty acres, with a great big house, and the Record Plant installed a studio for us. I don't know how much it cost us, but it was outrageous. They had a bar and people serving us... I'd wake up at four or five in the afternoon and say 'one Black Russian please'. We had motorcycles and Porsches and we'd go cruising around the countryside terrorizing everybody. We had a great time up there..." In the VH1 Behind the Music episode on the group, Douglas states, "People were shooting, bullets were flying. It was insane. People, drugs and guns. You know, they don't go together," with drummer Joey Kramer adding, "I don't know if we did any of those sessions, or made any of that record, straight."

== Album cover and title ==
Artist Al Hirschfeld visited the group during the sessions at the Cenacle to draw the iconic album cover. Tyler remembers, "The cartoonist Al Hirschfeld came up while we were there and drew the caricature of the group that's on the cover of Draw the Line. He really nailed us. We look like freakish botanical specimens pinned under glass. Draw the Line—it was the perfect title for the way we were living. I always went too far and was often reminded that I never knew where to draw the line. I hated to hear that, but that's how it was. Say 'Don't do it,' and we would do it. 'Cause I knew that if you don't know where to draw the line, then your choices become infinite." Douglas continues, "Draw The Line is a classic title that says it all, the coke lines, heroin lines, drawing symbolic lines and crossing them all – no matter what."

== Reception ==
Professional ratings
Review scores
Source	Rating
AllMusic	3.5/5 stars
Christgau's Record Guide	B−
Collector's Guide to Heavy Metal	9/10
The Encyclopedia of Popular Music	3/5 stars
MusicHound Rock: The Essential Album Guide	2.5/5 stars
The Rolling Stone Album Guide	2/5 stars

Contemporary reviews were mixed. Billy Altman of Rolling Stone called the LP "a truly horrendous record, chaotic to the point of malfunction and with an almost impenetrably dense sound adding to the confusion." Robert Christgau considered the album the product of a band "out of gas". The Globe and Mail opined that "'Critical Mass' and 'Get It Up' are both bright numbers with solid rhythms while 'Draw the Line' and 'I Wanna Know Why' didn't deserve preservation."

Retrospective reviews are more positive. Kerrang! magazine listed the album at No. 37 among the "100 Greatest Heavy Metal Albums of All Time" for its "high energy", although it never touches heavy metal as a genre, concluding with the comment "sleaze was never so classy." According to Greg Prato of AllMusic, "the band shies away from studio experimenting and dabbling in different styles," returning "to simple, straight-ahead hard rock" and releasing "the last true studio album from Aerosmith's original lineup for nearly a decade." Another AllMusic reviewer stated that, "although some fans see Draw the Line as the beginning of a decline for Aerosmith, it still offers up some strong hard-rock tunes. One of its best moments is the title track, one of the group's most relentless rockers." In a review for Ultimate Classic Rock, Sterling Whitaker cited "Get It Up" as an example of a track that "should-have-been-great-but-not-quite," saying that it "featured important elements of the classic Aerosmith sound, but somehow didn't catch fire." Martin Popoff defined Draw the Line "complicated, murky and layered", coming across as "the serious, distressed Aerosmith album". He also wrote that despite "being ambiguously dense, uncommunicative and busy", the album showed the band reaching "new levels of musical maturity."

Draw the Line went platinum its first month of release, entering the music charts on December 24, 1977, peaking at No. 11 on the US Billboard 200, and eventually being certified 2× platinum nearly a decade later. Even so, it marks the band's first slowdown in album sales of their 1970s era, after their initial rise with the albums Toys in the Attic and Rocks.

== Track listing ==
Side one
No.	Title	Writer(s)	Length
1.	"Draw the Line"	Steven Tyler, Joe Perry	3:23
2.	"I Wanna Know Why"	Tyler, Perry	3:09
3.	"Critical Mass"	Tyler, Tom Hamilton, Jack Douglas	4:53
4.	"Get It Up"	Tyler, Perry	4:02
5.	"Bright Light Fright"	Perry	2:19

Side two
No.	Title	Writer(s)	Length
1.	"Kings and Queens"	Tyler, Brad Whitford, Hamilton, Joey Kramer, Douglas	4:55
2.	"The Hand That Feeds"	Tyler, Whitford, Hamilton, Kramer, Douglas	4:23
3.	"Sight for Sore Eyes"	Tyler, Perry, Douglas, David Johansen	3:56
4.	"Milk Cow Blues"	Kokomo Arnold	4:14
Total length:			35:14

== Personnel ==
Aerosmith

- Steven Tyler – lead vocals, harmonica, keyboards, piano on "Kings and Queens", backing vocals on "Bright Light Fright"
- Joe Perry – lead guitar; rhythm guitar on "Kings and Queens", "I Wanna Know Why", "The Hand That Feeds"; slide guitar and second solo of "Milk Cow Blues"; backing vocals, lead vocals on "Bright Light Fright"
- Brad Whitford – rhythm guitar, lead guitar on "Kings and Queens", "I Wanna Know Why", "The Hand That Feeds", and first solo of "Milk Cow Blues"
- Tom Hamilton – bass guitar
- Joey Kramer – drums, percussion

Guest musicians

- Stan Bronstein – saxophone on "I Wanna Know Why" and "Bright Light Fright"
- Scott Cushnie – piano on "I Wanna Know Why", "Critical Mass", and "Kings and Queens"
- Karen Lawrence – backing vocals on "Get It Up"
- Jack Douglas – mandolin on "Kings and Queens"
- Paul Prestopino – acoustic guitar, banjo guitar on "Kings and Queens"

Production

- Jack Douglas – producer and arrangements with Aerosmith
- David Krebs, Steve Leber – executive producers, management, art direction
- Jay Messina – engineer
- David Hewitt – remote truck director
- Sam Ginsberg – assistant engineer
- George Marino – mastering at Sterling Sound, New York
- Al Hirschfeld – cover illustration

== Charts ==
Chart (1977–1978)	Peak position
Canada Top Albums/CDs (RPM)	10
French Albums (SNEP)	6
Japanese Albums (Oricon)	9
US Billboard 200	11

== Certifications ==
Region	Certification	Certified units/sales
Canada (Music Canada)	Gold	50,000^{^}
Japan (RIAJ)	Gold	100,000
United States (RIAA)	2× Platinum	2,000,000^{^}
^{^} Shipments figures based on certification alone.
