= Wherehouse =

Coordinates: 42°22′49″N 71°14′17″W

- Interactive map of the Wherehouse area

General information
- Location: 55 Pond Street, Waltham, Massachusetts, United States

The Wherehouse, officially titled A. Wherehouse, is a warehouse located at 55 Pond Street in Waltham, Massachusetts, United States.

It was rented out by the rock band Aerosmith, starting in 1975 and continuing into the 1980s. The warehouse featured a garage where the band members would park their cars, upstairs offices for the band's personnel, and a ground-level recording studio and stage where the band would often rehearse, write, and record music. The band would also hold meetings here and use the building to party. This is where the "Rocks" album was actually recorded, using a portable studio parked in the garage.

Steve Leber and David Krebs, managers for Aerosmith during the 1970s, also managed Ted Nugent and Mahogany Rush. Those artists also used the Wherehouse as a practice and tour rehearsal site when they were in Boston.

The Wherehouse was also the birthplace of Aero Force One, the band's official fan club. Ray Tabano, musician and founding member of the band in 1970, left the band and started up the club in 1971, writing newsletters and selling merchandise out of the building. Tabano was also responsible for the general maintenance of the building and its offices.

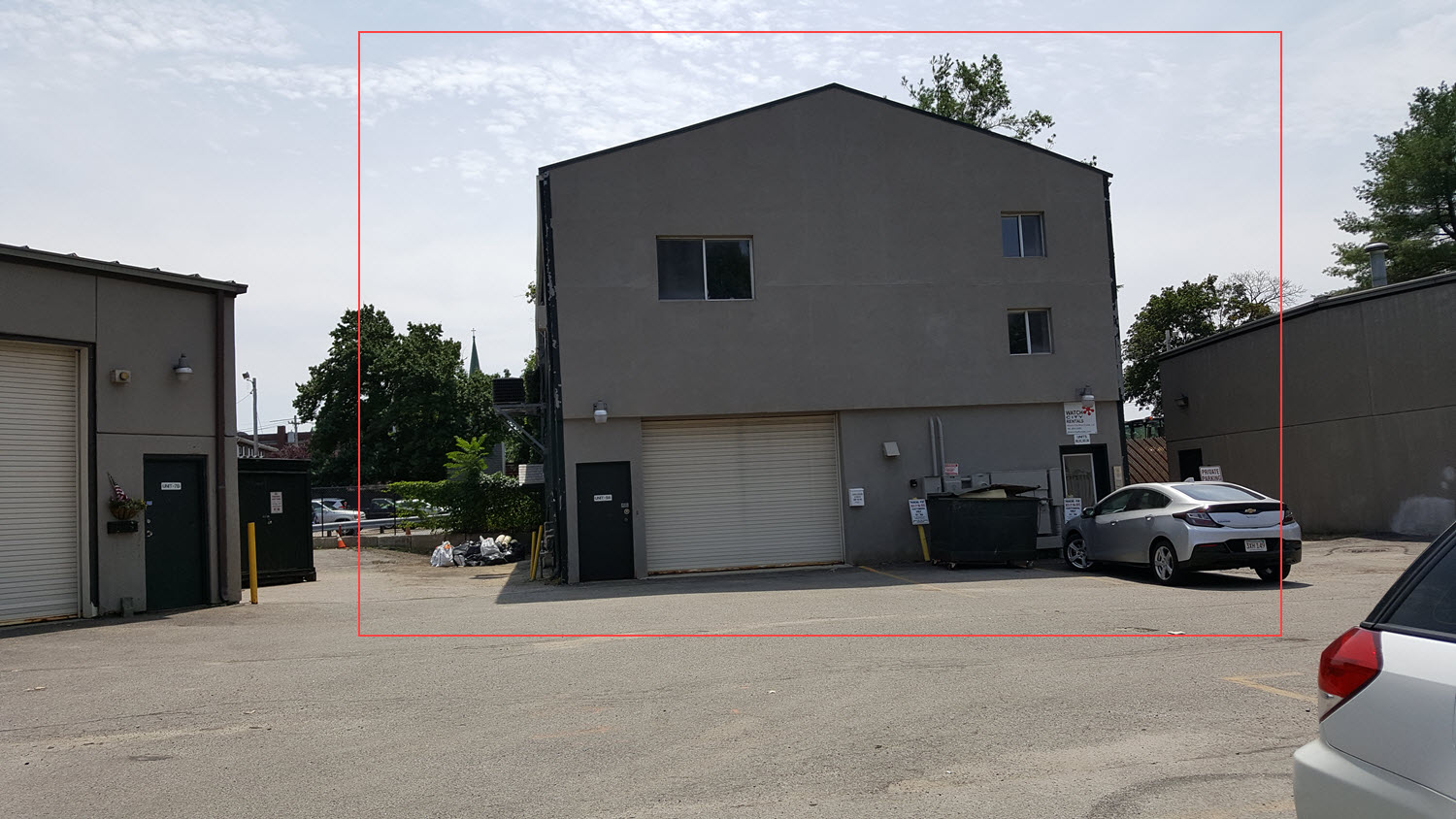
A Wherehouse. Picture taken July 24, 2017.

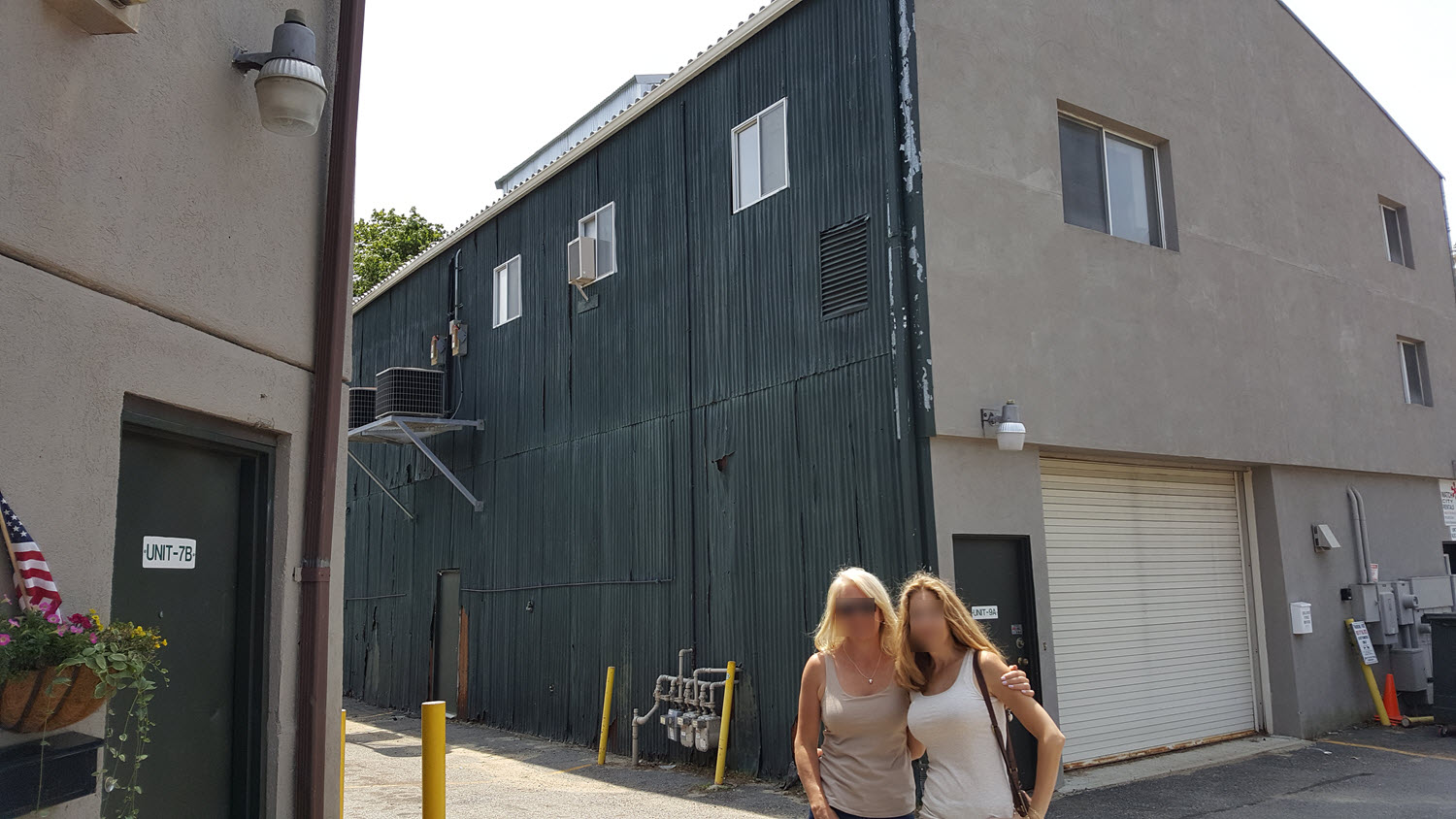
A. Wherehouse Picture taken July 24, 2017. (2)

Occasionally, Aerosmith would rent out the stage and studio to other musicians. The band Boston scored their famous record deal when they rented out the building and played for record company executives here.
