= Richard Supa =

American songwriter and guitarist

- Born: Richard Goodman; April 9, 1944 (age 82)
- Occupations: Songwriter; guitarist
- Instrument: Guitar

Richard "Richie" Supa (Richard Goodman; April 9, 1944) is an American songwriter and guitarist best known for his work with Aerosmith, the Rascals and Richie Sambora.

Supa released several albums under his own name, including Supa's Jamboree (1971, Paramount 6009), Homespun (1972, Paramount PAS 6027), Lifelines (1976, Epic PE34277) and Tall Tales (1978, Polydor PD-1-6155). Richard's song "Stone County Wanted Man", which appeared on the Supa's Jamboree album, was recorded by Johnny Winter for his Saints & Sinners album.

A longtime friend of Aerosmith, he has made a number of musical contributions to the band and has offered moral support. He temporarily replaced Joe Perry when he left the band in 1979, and contributed guitars to the studio album Night in the Ruts (1979). Additionally, Supa wrote or co-wrote several Aerosmith songs, including the hits "Chip Away the Stone" (1978), "Lightning Strikes" (1982), "Amazing" (1993) and "Pink" (1997), among others.

Supa co-wrote most of the songs on Bon Jovi guitarist Richie Sambora's second solo album Undiscovered Soul. He wrote the song "Misery" for the album Missundaztood by Pink, on which both Aerosmith's singer Steven Tyler and Richie Sambora feature. Supa also collaborated and co-wrote the songs "My Interpretation", "Your Sympathy" and "Instant Martyr" from Mika's debut album Life in Cartoon Motion. He also co-wrote "Back on Earth" for singer Ozzy Osbourne.

Supa is now the director of creative recovery at Recovery Unplugged Treatment Center, where he uses music to help addicts in recovery.
