= Jack Douglas (music producer) =

American record producer (1945–2026)

Background information
- Born: November 6, 1945; New York City, U.S.
- Died: May 11, 2026 (aged 80) Paramus, New Jersey, U.S.
- Genre: Rock
- Occupations: Record producer; musician; engineer
- Years active: 1971–2026

John Anthony Douglas (November 6, 1945 – May 11, 2026) was an American record producer. He was known for his work with John Lennon and Yoko Ono, Patti Smith, Cheap Trick, and the New York Dolls, among other rock artists during the 1970s and 1980s. He produced four successful albums for Aerosmith.

== Early life and education ==
Jack Douglas was born in the Bronx, New York City, on November 6, 1945. He was trained at the Institute of Audio Research and was a member of its first graduating class.

== Career ==
Starting out as a folk musician and performer, he worked on Robert F. Kennedy's 1964 senatorial campaign as a songwriter. Douglas then moved to England and joined a succession of bands before returning to New York to attend the Institute of Audio Research.

His first professional job was at the then-new Record Plant, not as a producer or engineer, but as a studio janitor. Soon he was working at the recording desk, as a recording engineer, contributing to projects by Miles Davis, James Gang, Alice Cooper, Cheap Trick, Montrose, Rough Cutt, Artful Dodger, Moxy, Flipp, and Mountain.

A chance encounter with a group member led Douglas to help engineer the Who's 1971 Record Plant sessions for the aborted Lifehouse project. Songs developed from these sessions were later included on Who's Next (1971). Douglas was then given the opportunity to engineer John Lennon's album Imagine in 1971. Douglas and Lennon formed a close bond and worked together for the remainder of Lennon's life.

As a Record Plant staff engineer, Douglas also forged working relationships with Patti Smith, Blue Öyster Cult, the New York Dolls, Cheap Trick, Starz, and most notably Aerosmith. It was during the recording of the New York Dolls' first album that Douglas was encouraged by producer Bob Ezrin to also consider becoming a record producer.

Douglas engineered and produced many of Aerosmith's albums of the 1970s, including Get Your Wings (1974), Toys in the Attic (1975), Rocks (1976), and Draw the Line (1977), all of which have gone multi-platinum. Toys in the Attic and Rocks broke Aerosmith into the mainstream and have become highly influential, with both albums ranking among Rolling Stone's list of the 500 Greatest Albums of All Time.

The close relationship between Douglas and Aerosmith extended beyond producing and engineering, as Douglas was also a musical contributor to the group when they came up short of material on their projects. For example, Douglas helped write the band's 1978 hit "Kings and Queens". He was often given the nickname of "the sixth member" of Aerosmith, due to his close relationship with the band. Douglas was replaced as producer by the band for the 1979 release Night in the Ruts, but Douglas was to again work with the group on 1982's Rock in a Hard Place and several of Aerosmith guitarist Joe Perry's solo albums. For much of the late 1980s, 1990s, and early 2000s, Aerosmith worked with other producers, but in the mid-2000s, they re-united with Douglas on the 2004 blues cover album Honkin' on Bobo. Douglas also produced the band's album Music from Another Dimension! in 2012, himself providing the narration on the album's opening track "LUV XXX", parodying the style of narration from The Outer Limits.

In 1980, Douglas was working as producer with John Lennon and Yoko Ono on their Double Fantasy album (for which he shared a Grammy Award for Album of the Year). During the same sessions he worked on a follow-up Lennon/Ono album, Milk and Honey, but Lennon's murder on December 8, 1980, cut that project short. An unfinished version of the album was released in 1984. Also in 1984, Douglas opened litigation with Ono over unpaid royalties from Double Fantasy. A jury ruled that Ono had wrongfully withheld royalty payments from Douglas and that he was entitled to $2.5 million from revenues for Double Fantasy and an undetermined share of revenues from Milk and Honey.

Subsequently, Douglas worked as an engineer and producer, producing albums for artists such as Supertramp, Zebra, Clutch, Local H, Slash's Snakepit, Blackrain, and, in 2006, the return of the New York Dolls.

Douglas also taught a studio etiquette class at Ex'pression College for Digital Arts.

== Personal life and death ==
Douglas was married twice and had four children: two daughters and two sons. He died in Paramus, New Jersey, from complications of lymphoma on May 11, 2026, at the age of 80.
