= List of songs recorded by Aerosmith =

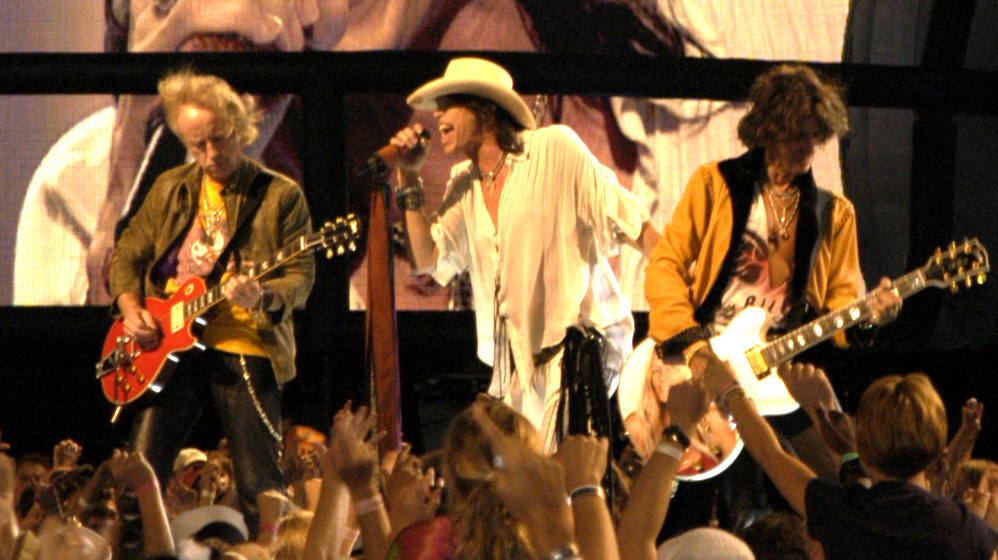
Brad Whitford, Steven Tyler, and Joe Perry of Aerosmith performing at the NFL Kickoff in Washington, DC on September 4, 2003.

The following is a list of released songs recorded and performed by Aerosmith.

Song	Writer(s)	Original release	Year	Ref.
"Adam's Apple"	Steven Tyler	Toys in the Attic	1975	
"Ain't Enough"	Joe Perry; Steven Tyler	B-side to "Love in an Elevator"/Pump (Japanese edition)	1989	
"Ain't That a Bitch"	Steven Tyler; Joe Perry; Desmond Child	Nine Lives	1997	
"All Your Love"	Otis Rush	Pandora's Box	1991	
"Amazing"	Steven Tyler; Richard Supa	Get a Grip	1993	
"Angel"	Steven Tyler; Desmond Child	Permanent Vacation	1987	
"Angel's Eye"	Marti Frederiksen; Joe Perry; Taylor Rhodes; Steven Tyler	Charlie's Angels (Soundtrack)	2000	
"Another Last Goodbye"	Steven Tyler; Desmond Child; Joe Perry	Music from Another Dimension!	2012	
"A Thousand Days"	Joe Perry; Matt Schwartz; Steven Tyler; Yungblud	One More Time (EP)	2025	
"Attitude Adjustment"	Steven Tyler; Joe Perry; Marti Frederiksen	Nine Lives	1997	
"Avant Garden"	Steven Tyler; Joe Perry; Marti Frederiksen; Mark Hudson	Just Push Play	2001	
"Baby, Please Don't Go"	Big Joe Williams	Honkin' on Bobo	2004	
"Back Back Train"	Fred McDowell	Honkin' on Bobo	2004	
"Back in the Saddle"	Steven Tyler; Joe Perry	Rocks	1976	
"Beautiful"	Steven Tyler; Marti Frederiksen; Brad Whitford; Joey Kramer; Tom Hamilton	Music from Another Dimension!	2012	
"Beyond Beautiful"	Steven Tyler; Joe Perry; Marti Frederiksen	Just Push Play	2001	
"Big Ten Inch Record"	Fred Weismantel	Toys in the Attic	1975	
"Bitch's Brew"	Steven Tyler; Jimmy Crespo	Rock in a Hard Place	1982	
"Blind Man"	Joe Perry; Taylor Rhodes; Steven Tyler	Big Ones	1994	
"Bolivian Ragamuffin"	Steven Tyler; Jimmy Crespo	Rock in a Hard Place	1982	
"Bone to Bone (Coney Island White Fish Boy)"	Steven Tyler	Night in the Ruts	1979	
"Boogie Man"	Joe Perry; Steven Tyler; Jim Vallance	Get a Grip	1993	
"Bright Light Fright"	Joe Perry	Draw the Line	1977	
"Can't Stop Lovin' You" (featuring Carrie Underwood)	Steven Tyler; Marti Frederiksen; Brad Whitford; Joey Kramer; Tom Hamilton	Music from Another Dimension!	2012	
"Can't Stop Messin'"	Jack Blades; Joe Perry; Tommy Shaw; Steven Tyler	Get a Grip (International editions)	1993	
"Cheese Cake"	Steven Tyler; Joe Perry	Night in the Ruts	1979	
"Chip Away the Stone"	Richie Supa	Live Bootleg	1978	
"Chiquita"	Steven Tyler; Joe Perry	Night in the Ruts	1979	
"Circle Jerk" (instrumental)	Brad Whitford	Pandora's Box	1991	
"Closer"	Steven Tyler; Marti Frederiksen; Joey Kramer	Music from Another Dimension!	2012	
"Come Together"	John Lennon Paul McCartney	Sgt. Pepper's Lonely Hearts Club Band	1978	
"Combination"	Joe Perry	Rocks	1976	
"Crash"	Steven Tyler; Joe Perry; Mark Hudson; Dominic Miller	Nine Lives	1997	
"Crazy"	Steven Tyler; Joe Perry; Desmond Child	Get a Grip	1993	
"Critical Mass"	Steven Tyler; Tom Hamilton; Jack Douglas	Draw the Line	1977	
"Cry Me a River"	Arthur Hamilton	Rock in a Hard Place	1982	
"Cryin'"	Steven Tyler; Joe Perry; Taylor Rhodes	Get a Grip	1993	
"Darkness"	Steven Tyler	Done with Mirrors	1985	
"Deuces Are Wild"	Steven Tyler; Jim Vallance	The Beavis and Butt-Head Experience	1993	
"Devil's Got a New Disguise"	Joe Perry; Steven Tyler; Diane Warren	Devil's Got a New Disguise: The Very Best of Aerosmith	2006	
"Don't Get Mad, Get Even"	Steven Tyler; Joe Perry	Pump	1989	
"Don't Stop"	Joe Perry; Steven Tyler; Jim Vallance	B-side to "Livin' on the Edge"	1993	
"Downtown Charlie"	Aerosmith	Pandora's Box	1991	
"Draw the Line"	Steven Tyler; Joe Perry	Draw the Line	1977	
"Dream On"	Steven Tyler	Aerosmith	1973	
"Drop Dead Gorgeous"	Steven Tyler; Joe Perry; Mark Hudson	Just Push Play	2001	
"Dude (Looks Like a Lady)"	Steven Tyler; Joe Perry; Desmond Child	Permanent Vacation	1987	
"Eat the Rich"	Steven Tyler; Joe Perry; Jim Vallance	Get a Grip	1993	
"Eyesight to the Blind"	Sonny Boy Williamson II	Honkin' on Bobo	2004	
"F.I.N.E."	Steven Tyler; Joe Perry; Desmond Child	Pump	1989	
"Face"	Marti Frederiksen; Joe Perry; Steven Tyler	Just Push Play (International version)	2001	
"Fall Together"	Dean Grakal; Mark Hudson; Steven Tyler; Greg Wells	Nine Lives (International edition bonus track)	1997	
"Fallen Angels"	Steven Tyler; Joe Perry; Richard Supa	Nine Lives	1997	
"Falling in Love (Is Hard on the Knees)"	Steven Tyler; Joe Perry; Glen Ballard	Nine Lives	1997	
"Falling Off"	Marti Frederiksen; Joe Perry; Steven Tyler	B-side to "Hole in My Soul"/Nine Lives (Japanese Edition bonus track)	1997	
"Fever"	Steven Tyler; Joe Perry	Get a Grip	1993	
"Flesh"	Steven Tyler; Joe Perry; Desmond Child	Get a Grip	1993	
"Fly Away from Here"	Marti Frederiksen; Todd Chapman	Just Push Play	2001	
"Freedom Fighter"	Joe Perry	Music from Another Dimension!	2012	
"Full Circle"	Steven Tyler; Taylor Rhodes	Nine Lives	1997	
"Get a Grip"	Steven Tyler; Joe Perry; Jim Vallance	Get a Grip	1993	
"Get It Up"	Steven Tyler; Joe Perry	Draw the Line	1977	
"Get the Lead Out"	Steven Tyler; Joe Perry	Rocks	1976	
"Girl Keeps Coming Apart"	Steven Tyler; Joe Perry	Permanent Vacation	1987	
"Girls of Summer"	Marti Frederiksen; Joe Perry; Steven Tyler	O, Yeah! Ultimate Aerosmith Hits	2002	
"Give Peace a Chance"	John Lennon; Paul McCartney	Instant Karma: The Amnesty International Campaign to Save Darfur	2007	
"Gotta Love It"	Steven Tyler; Joe Perry; Mark Hudson	Get a Grip	1993	
"Gypsy Boots"	Joe Perry; Steven Tyler	Done with Mirrors	1985	
"Hangman Jury"	Steven Tyler; Joe Perry; Jim Vallance	Permanent Vacation	1987	
"Head First"	Joe Perry; Steven Tyler; Jim Vallance	B-side to "Eat the Rich"	1993	
"Heart's Done Time"	Joe Perry; Desmond Child	Permanent Vacation	1987	
"Helter Skelter"	John Lennon; Paul McCartney	Pandora's Box	1991	
"Hole in My Soul"	Steven Tyler; Joe Perry; Desmond Child	Nine Lives	1997	
"Home Tonight"	Steven Tyler	Rocks	1976	
"Hoodoo/Voodoo Medicine Man"	Steven Tyler; Brad Whitford	Pump	1989	
"I Ain't Got You"	Calvin Carter	Live Bootleg	1978	
"I Don't Want to Miss a Thing"	Diane Warren	Armageddon: The Album	1998	
"I Live In Connecticut"	Joe Perry; Steven Tyler	Pandora's Box	1991	
"I Wanna Know Why"	Steven Tyler; Joe Perry	Draw the Line	1977	
"I'm Down"	John Lennon; Paul McCartney	Permanent Vacation	1987	
"I'm Not Talkin'"	Mose Allison	Music from Another Dimension! (Japanese edition bonus track)	2012	
"I'm Ready"	Willie Dixon	Honkin' on Bobo	2004	
"Jaded"	Steven Tyler; Marti Frederiksen	Just Push Play	2001	
"Jailbait"	Steven Tyler; Jimmy Crespo	Rock in a Hard Place	1982	
"Janie's Got a Gun"	Steven Tyler; Tom Hamilton	Pump	1989	
"Jesus Is on the Main Line"	(Traditional; arranged by F. McDowell)	Honkin' on Bobo	2004	
"Jig Is Up"	Steven Tyler; Jimmy Crespo	Rock in a Hard Place	1982	
"Joanie's Butterfly"	Steven Tyler; Jimmy Crespo; Jack Douglas	Rock in a Hard Place	1982	
"Just Push Play"	Steven Tyler; Mark Hudson; Steve Dudas	Just Push Play	2001	
"Kings and Queens"	Tom Hamilton; Joey Kramer; Steven Tyler; Brad Whitford; Jack Douglas	Draw the Line	1977	
"Kiss Your Past Good-Bye"	Steven Tyler; Mark Hudson	Nine Lives	1997	
"Krawhitham" (Instrumental)	Brad Whitford; Tom Hamilton; Joey Kramer	Pandora's Box	1991	
"Last Child"	Steven Tyler; Brad Whitford	Rocks	1976	
"Lay It Down"	Donald DeGrate; Marti Frederiksen; Joe Perry; Steven Tyler	O, Yeah! Ultimate Aerosmith Hits	2002	
"Legendary Child"	Steven Tyler; Joe Perry; Jim Vallance	Music from Another Dimension!	2012	
"Let It Slide"	Joe Perry; Steven Tyler	Pandora's Box	1991	
"Let the Music Do the Talking"	Joe Perry	Done with Mirrors	1985	
"Lick and a Promise"	Steven Tyler; Joe Perry	Rocks	1976	
"Light Inside"	Steven Tyler; Joe Perry; Marti Frederiksen	Just Push Play	2001	
"Lightning Strikes"	Richard Supa	Rock in a Hard Place	1982	
"Line Up" (featuring Lenny Kravitz)	Steven Tyler; Joe Perry; Lenny Kravitz	Get a Grip	1993	
"Livin' on the Edge"	Steven Tyler; Joe Perry; Mark Hudson	Get a Grip	1993	
"Lizard Love"	Steven Tyler; Joe Perry; Jeff Lynne	Rugrats Go Wild: Music from the Motion Picture	2003	
"Lord of the Thighs"	Steven Tyler	Get Your Wings	1974	
"Love in an Elevator"	Steven Tyler; Joe Perry	Pump	1989	
"Love Me Two Times"	Robbie Krieger	Air America	1990	
"Lover Alot"	Steven Tyler; Marti Frederiksen; Joe Perry; Tom Hamilton; Brad Whitford; Joey Kramer; Jesse Kramer; Marco Moir	Music from Another Dimension!	2012	
"Luv Lies"	Steven Tyler; Joe Perry; Marti Frederiksen; Mark Hudson	Just Push Play	2001	
"Luv XXX"	Steven Tyler; Joe Perry	Music from Another Dimension!	2012	
"Magic Touch"	Steven Tyler; Joe Perry; Jim Vallance	Permanent Vacation	1987	
"Major Barbra"	Steven Tyler	Classics Live	1986	
"Make It"	Steven Tyler	Aerosmith	1973	
"Mama Kin"	Steven Tyler	Aerosmith	1973	
"Mia"	Steven Tyler	Night in the Ruts	1979	
"Milk Cow Blues"	Kokomo Arnold	Draw the Line	1977	
"Monkey on My Back"	Steven Tyler; Joe Perry	Pump	1989	
"Mother Popcorn"	James Brown; Alfred Ellis	Live Bootleg	1978	
"Movin' Out"	Steven Tyler; Joe Perry	Aerosmith	1973	
"My Fist Your Face"	Joe Perry; Steven Tyler	Done with Mirrors	1985	
"My Girl"	Steven Tyler; Joe Perry	Pump	1989	
"My Only Angel"	Joe Perry; Matt Schwartz; Steven Tyler; Yungblud	One More Time (EP)	2025	
"Never Loved a Girl"	Ronny Shannon	Honkin' on Bobo	2004	
"Nine Lives"	Steven Tyler; Joe Perry; Marti Frederiksen	Nine Lives	1997	
"No More No More"	Steven Tyler; Joe Perry	Toys in the Attic	1975	
"No Surprize"	Steven Tyler; Joe Perry	Night in the Ruts	1979	
"Nobody's Fault"	Steven Tyler; Brad Whitford	Rocks	1976	
"Oasis in the Night"	Joe Perry	Music from Another Dimension! (Deluxe edition bonus track)	2012	
"Oh Yeah"	Joe Perry	Music from Another Dimension!	2012	
"On the Road Again"	John Sebastian	Pandora's Box	1991	
"Once Is Enough"	Richard Supa	B-side to "Dude (Looks Like a Lady)"	1987	
"One Way Street"	Steven Tyler	Aerosmith	1973	
"Out Go the Lights"	Steven Tyler; Joe Perry	Music from Another Dimension!	2012	
"Outta Your Head"	Steven Tyler; Joe Perry; Marti Frederiksen	Just Push Play	2001	
"Pandora's Box"	Steven Tyler; Joey Kramer	Get Your Wings	1974	
"Permanent Vacation"	Steven Tyler; Brad Whitford	Permanent Vacation	1987	
"Pink"	Steven Tyler; Richard Supa; Glen Ballard	Nine Lives	1997	
"Prelude to Joanie"	Steven Tyler	Rock in a Hard Place	1982	
"Problems"	Joe Perry; Matt Schwartz; Steven Tyler; Yungblud	One More Time (EP)	2025	
"Push Comes to Shove"	Steven Tyler	Rock in a Hard Place	1982	
"Rag Doll"	Steven Tyler; Joe Perry; Jim Vallance; Holly Knight	Permanent Vacation	1987	
"Rats in the Cellar"	Steven Tyler; Joe Perry	Rocks	1976	
"Rattlesnake Shake"	Peter Green	Pandora's Box	1991	
"Reefer Head Woman"	J. Bennett; Jazz Gillum; Lester Melrose	Night in the Ruts	1979	
"Remember (Walking in the Sand)"	George "Shadow" Morton	Night in the Ruts	1979	
"Riff & Roll"	Jimmy Crespo; Steven Tyler	Pandora's Box	1991	
"Road Runner"	Ellas McDaniel	Honkin' on Bobo	2004	
"Rock in a Hard Place (Cheshire Cat)"	Steven Tyler; Jimmy Crespo; Jack Douglas	Rock in a Hard Place	1982	
"Rockin' Pneumonia and the Boogie Woogie Flu"	Huey "Piano" Smith; Johnny Vincent	Less than Zero	1987	
"Round and Round"	Steven Tyler; Brad Whitford	Toys in the Attic	1975	
"S.O.S. (Too Bad)"	Steven Tyler	Get Your Wings	1974	
"Same Old Song and Dance"	Steven Tyler; Joe Perry	Get Your Wings	1974	
"Seasons of Wither"	Steven Tyler	Get Your Wings	1974	
"Sedona Sunrise"	Jim Vallance	Devil's Got a New Disguise: The Very Best of Aerosmith	2006	
"Shakey Ground"	Jeffrey Bowen; Al Boyd; Eddie Hazel	Music from Another Dimension! (Japanese edition bonus track)	2012	
"Shame on You"	Steven Tyler	Done with Mirrors	1985	
"Shame, Shame, Shame"	Ruby Fisher; Kenyon Hopkins	Honkin' on Bobo	2004	
"Shela"	Steven Tyler; Brad Whitford	Done with Mirrors	1985	
"She's on Fire"	Joe Perry; Steven Tyler	Done with Mirrors	1985	
"Shit House Shuffle"	Joe Perry	Pandora's Box	1991	
"Shut Up and Dance"	Jack Blades; Joe Perry; Tommy Shaw; Steven Tyler	Get a Grip	1993	
"Sick as a Dog"	Steven Tyler; Tom Hamilton	Rocks	1976	
"Sight for Sore Eyes"	Steven Tyler; Joe Perry; Jack Douglas; David Johansen	Draw the Line	1977	
"Simoriah"	Steven Tyler; Joe Perry; Jim Vallance	Permanent Vacation	1987	
"Somebody"	Steven Tyler; S. Emspack	Aerosmith	1973	
"Something"	Joe Perry	Music from Another Dimension!	2012	
"Something's Gotta Give"	Steven Tyler; Joe Perry; Marti Frederiksen	Nine Lives	1997	
"Soul Saver"	Brad Whitford; Steven Tyler	Pandora's Box	1991	
"Spaced"	Steven Tyler; Joe Perry	Get Your Wings	1974	
"St. John"	Steven Tyler	Permanent Vacation	1987	
"Stop Messin' Around"	Clifford Adams; Peter Green	Honkin' on Bobo	2004	
"Street Jesus"	Steven Tyler; Brad Whitford; Joe Perry	Music from Another Dimension!	2012	
"Subway"	Brad Whitford; Tom Hamilton; Joey Kramer	B-side to "Sweet Emotion" from Pandora's Box	1991	
"Sunny Side of Love"	Marti Frederiksen; Steven Tyler	Music from Another Dimension! (Deluxe edition bonus track)	2012	
"Sunshine"	Steven Tyler; Joe Perry; Marti Frederiksen	Just Push Play	2001	
"Sweet Emotion"	Steven Tyler; Tom Hamilton	Toys in the Attic	1975	
"Taste of India"	Steven Tyler; Joe Perry; Glen Ballard	Nine Lives	1997	
"Tell Me"	Tom Hamilton	Music from Another Dimension!	2012	
"Temperature"	Joel Cohen; Walter Jacobs	Honkin' on Bobo	2004	
"The Farm"	Steven Tyler; Joe Perry; Mark Hudson	Nine Lives	1997	
"The Grind"	Marti Frederiksen; Joe Perry; Steven Tyler	Honkin' on Bobo	2004	
"The Hand That Feeds"	Tom Hamilton; Joey Kramer; Steven Tyler; Brad Whitford; Jack Douglas	Draw the Line	1977	
"The Hop"	Tom Hamilton; Joey Kramer; Joe Perry; Steven Tyler; Brad Whitford	Done with Mirrors	1985	
"The Movie"	Steven Tyler; Joe Perry; Brad Whitford; Tom Hamilton; Joey Kramer	Permanent Vacation	1987	
"The Other Side"	Steven Tyler; Jim Vallance	Pump	1989	
"The Reason a Dog"	Tom Hamilton; Steven Tyler	Done with Mirrors	1985	
"Theme from Spider-Man"	Robert Harris; Paul Francis Webster	Music from and Inspired by Spider-Man	2002	
"Theme from Wayne's World"	G. E. Smith; Mike Myers	B-side to "The Other Side"	1990	
"Think About It"	Keith Relf; Jim McCarty; Jimmy Page	Night in the Ruts	1979	
"Three Mile Smile"	Steven Tyler	Night in the Ruts	1979	
"Toys in the Attic"	Steven Tyler; Joe Perry	Toys in the Attic	1975	
"Train Kept A Rollin'"	Tiny Bradshaw; Howard Kay; Lois Mann	Get Your Wings	1974	
"Trip Hoppin'"	Steven Tyler; Joe Perry; Marti Frederiksen; Mark Hudson	Just Push Play	2001	
"Uncle Salty"	Steven Tyler; Tom Hamilton	Toys in the Attic	1975	
"Under My Skin"	Steven Tyler; Joe Perry; Marti Frederiksen; Mark Hudson	Just Push Play	2001	
"Up on the Mountain"	Tom Hamilton	Music from Another Dimension! (Deluxe edition bonus track)	2012	
"Walk On Down"	Joe Perry	Get a Grip	1993	
"Walk on Water"	Jack Blades; Joe Perry; Tommy Shaw; Steven Tyler	Big Ones	1994	
"Walk This Way"	Steven Tyler; Joe Perry	Toys in the Attic	1975	
"Walkin' the Dog"	Rufus Thomas	Aerosmith	1973	
"We All Fall Down"	Diane Warren	Music from Another Dimension!	2012	
"What Could Have Been Love"	Marti Frederiksen; Russ Irwin; Steven Tyler	Music from Another Dimension!	2012	
"What It Takes"	Steven Tyler; Joe Perry; Desmond Child	Pump	1989	
"What Kind of Love Are You On"	Jack Blades; Joe Perry; Tommy Shaw; Steven Tyler	Armageddon: The Album	1998	
"Woman of the World"	Steven Tyler; D. Solomon	Get Your Wings	1974	
"Won't Let You Down"	Marti Frederiksen; Joe Perry; Steven Tyler	Just Push Play (Japanese edition)	2001	
"Write Me a Letter"	Steven Tyler	Aerosmith	1973	
"You Gotta Move"	Rev. Gary Davis; Fred McDowell	Honkin' on Bobo	2004	
"You See Me Crying"	Steven Tyler; D. Solomon	Toys in the Attic	1975	
"Young Lust"	Steven Tyler; Joe Perry; Jim Vallance	Pump	1989	
"Wild Woman"	Joe Perry; Matt Schwartz; Steven Tyler; Yungblud	One More Time (EP)	2025	
