= Cocked, Locked, Ready to Rock Tour =

2010 concert tour by Aerosmith

- Tour by Aerosmith
- Location: Europe; South America; North America
- Start date: May 17, 2010
- End date: September 16, 2010
- Legs: 3
- No. of shows: 42 (scheduled & played)

Aerosmith concert chronology
- Aerosmith/ZZ Top Tour (2009); Cocked, Locked, Ready to Rock Tour (2010); Back on the Road Tour (2011)

The Cocked, Locked, Ready to Rock Tour was a concert tour by American hard rock band Aerosmith that took place during mid-2010. In late spring and early summer of 2010, the band performed in South America and Europe, respectively, marking their first concerts on those continents since 2007. During the second half of summer, the band toured North America. Prior to the tour, the band confirmed that the lead singer would be Steven Tyler, after rumors of his departure in late 2009.

The tour included a headlining show at Download Festival, playing the festival's venue – Donington Park – for the first time in 16 years. Aerosmith also performed in Venezuela, Chile, Costa Rica, and Romania for the first time in 16 years. The tour also saw the band perform in Peru and Greece for the first time in their careers.

In North America, the band played in many locations that they missed due to the cancellation of dates on their prior Guitar Hero Aerosmith Tour in 2009.

In total, Aerosmith performed in 18 countries on this tour.

== Tour dates ==
Date	City	Country	Venue	Opening acts
South America/Central America
May 17, 2010	Caracas	Venezuela	Poliedro de Caracas	—N/a
May 20, 2010	Bogotá	Colombia	Simón Bolívar Park	—N/a
May 22, 2010	Lima	Peru	Explanada del Estadio Monumental	Amen
May 25, 2010	Santiago	Chile	Parque O'Higgins	—N/a
May 27, 2010	Porto Alegre	Brazil	Estacionamento da Fiergs	—N/a
May 29, 2010	São Paulo	Brazil	Estádio Palestra Itália	Cachorro Grande
June 1, 2010	Alajuela	Costa Rica	Autódromo La Guácima	Gandhi
Europe
June 10, 2010	Sölvesborg	Sweden	Sweden Rock Festival	—N/a
June 13, 2010	Donington Park	England	Download Festival	—N/a
June 15, 2010	London	England	O2 Arena	Airbourne & TAB the Band
June 18, 2010	Bucharest	Romania	Zone Arena	—N/a
June 20, 2010	Athens	Greece	Karaiskaki Stadium	—N/a
June 23, 2010	Arnhem	Netherlands	Gelredome	—N/a
June 25, 2010	Dessel	Belgium	Graspop Metal Meeting	—N/a
June 27, 2010	Barcelona	Spain	Palau Sant Jordi (Opening act: The Cribs)	
June 29, 2010	Paris	France	Palais Omnisports de Paris-Bercy	—N/a
July 1, 2010	Prague	Czech Republic	O2 Arena	—N/a
July 3, 2010	Venice	Italy	Heineken Jammin' Festival	—N/a
North America				—N/a
July 23, 2010	Oakland	United States	Oracle Arena	Sammy Hagar
July 26, 2010	Paso Robles	United States	Mid-State Fair	—N/a
July 29, 2010	Irvine	United States	Verizon Wireless Amphitheatre	Cheap Trick
July 31, 2010	Las Vegas	United States	MGM Grand Garden Arena	Sammy Hagar
August 3, 2010	Dallas	United States	Gexa Energy Pavilion	Blue October
August 5, 2010	The Woodlands	United States	Cynthia Woods Mitchell Pavilion	Sammy Hagar
August 7, 2010	Tampa	United States	1-800-ASK-GARY Amphitheatre	Blue Öyster Cult
August 9, 2010	Sunrise	United States	BankAtlantic Center	Sammy Hagar
August 12, 2010	Wantagh	United States	Nikon at Jones Beach Theater	Sammy Hagar
August 14, 2010	Boston	United States	Fenway Park	J. Geils Band
August 17, 2010	Toronto	Canada	Air Canada Centre	Sammy Hagar
August 19, 2010	Omaha	United States	Qwest Center	Sammy Hagar
August 22, 2010	Tinley Park	United States	First Midwest Bank Amphitheater	Buckcherry
August 24, 2010	Holmdel	United States	PNC Bank Arts Center	Sammy Hagar
August 26, 2010	Syracuse	United States	New York State Fair	—N/a
August 28, 2010	Atlantic City	United States	Boardwalk Hall	Sammy Hagar
August 31, 2010	Auburn Hills	United States	The Palace of Auburn Hills	Sammy Hagar
September 2, 2010	Cincinnati	United States	Riverbend Music Center	Sammy Hagar
September 4, 2010	Uncasville	United States	Mohegan Sun Arena	Mighty Mighty Bosstones
September 8, 2010	Winnipeg	Canada	MTS Centre	Joan Jett and the Blackhearts
September 10, 2010	Calgary	Canada	Pengrowth Saddledome	Joan Jett and the Blackhearts
September 12, 2010	Saskatoon	Canada	Credit Union Centre	Joan Jett and the Blackhearts
September 14, 2010	Edmonton	Canada	Rexall Place	Joan Jett and the Blackhearts
September 16, 2010	Vancouver	Canada	Rogers Arena	Joan Jett and the Blackhearts

- Top 50 Worldwide Tours 2010: #34
- Total Gross: US $36.4 million
- Total Attendance: 478,192 (counting only the 39 shows)

== Personnel ==
Aerosmith members:

- Steven Tyler – lead vocals, harmonica, piano
- Tom Hamilton – bass
- Joey Kramer – drums
- Joe Perry – lead and rhythm guitar, backing and lead vocals, talkbox
- Brad Whitford – rhythm and lead guitar

Additional musicians

- Russ Irwin – keyboards, backing vocals

== Set ==
For the set, Aerosmith played an average of about 16 to 20 songs at each show, with a good mix from the different eras of their catalog. About 14 to 18 songs comprised the main set, with an additional 2 or 3 songs played during the encore. The concert in The Woodlands featured 5 songs in the encore, but featured a shorter main set. During the North American leg of the tour, the setlist whittled away from 20 songs at the start of the tour down to 17 songs in the middle of the tour, but went back up to 20 songs for the Tinley Park and Uncasville shows, and ranged from 17 to 19 songs at other shows. In addition, a drum solo by Joey Kramer occurred during the middle of the set, and at most concerts, Joe Perry performed a duel against the Guitar Hero: Aerosmith version of himself, like the previous year's Guitar Hero Aerosmith Tour, before performing a song in which he sang lead vocals (either "Stop Messin' Around", "Red House", or "Combination").

=== List of songs played on tour ===
Album	Song	Times
Aerosmith (1973)	"Dream On"	42
Aerosmith	"One Way Street"	3
Aerosmith	"Mama Kin"	11
Aerosmith	"Movin' Out"	1
Aerosmith	"Walkin' the Dog" (Rufus Thomas cover)	6
Get Your Wings (1974)	"Same Old Song and Dance"	7
Get Your Wings	"Lord of the Thighs"	16
Get Your Wings	"S.O.S. (Too Bad)"	1
Get Your Wings	"Train Kept A-Rollin'" (Tiny Bradshaw cover)	28
Toys in the Attic (1975)	"Toys in the Attic"	22
Toys in the Attic	"Walk This Way"	42
Toys in the Attic	"Sweet Emotion"	42
Toys in the Attic	"No More No More"	11
Rocks (1976)	"Back in the Saddle"	19
Rocks	"Last Child"	28
Rocks	"Rats in the Cellar"	1
Rocks	"Combination"	3
Draw the Line (1977)	"Draw the Line"	42
Draw the Line	"Kings and Queens"	2
Draw the Line	"Milk Cow Blues" (Kokomo Arnold cover)	1
Sgt. Pepper's Lonely Hearts Club Band (soundtrack) (1978)	"Come Together" (Beatles cover)	19
Live! Bootleg (1978)	"Chip Away the Stone"	6
Permanent Vacation (1987)	"Rag Doll"	28
Pump (1989)	"Love in an Elevator"	42
Pump	"Monkey on My Back"	1
Pump	"Janie's Got a Gun"	2
Pump	"What It Takes"	39
Get a Grip (1993)	"Eat the Rich"	20
Get a Grip	"Livin' on the Edge"	42
Get a Grip	"Cryin'"	42
Get a Grip	"Crazy"	10
Nine Lives (1997)	"Falling in Love (Is Hard on the Knees)"	35
Nine Lives	"Pink"	37
Armageddon soundtrack (1998)	"I Don't Want to Miss a Thing"	39
Just Push Play (2001)	"Jaded"	16
Honkin' on Bobo (2004)	"Baby, Please Don't Go" (Big Joe Williams cover)	31
Honkin' on Bobo	"Stop Messin' Around" (Fleetwood Mac cover)	37
Rockin' the Joint (2005)	"Rattlesnake Shake" (Fleetwood Mac cover)	1
Are You Experienced (1967)	"Red House" (Jimi Hendrix Experience cover)	2

Song	Times
Show Openers
Love in an Elevator	14
Train Kept A-Rollin	8
Same Old Song and Dance	7
Back in the Saddle	5
Eat the Rich	5
Toys in the Attic	2
Rats in the Cellar	1

Song	Times
Main Set Closer
Draw the Line	42

Song	Times
Show Closers
Toys in the Attic	18
Walk This Way	17
Train Kept A-Rollin	4
Crazy	1
Rattlesnake Shake	1
Walking the Dog	1

== Problems ==
While there were little to no problems during the South American and European legs of the tour, tension within the band grew during the North American leg. The tension began when rumors began to circulate in late July and early August that Steven Tyler would replace Simon Cowell as judge on the television series American Idol. Joe Perry criticized Tyler for not consulting the rest of the band, saying that he "found out on the internet, like the rest of the world" and that nobody else in the band knew anything about it. On August 18, many news outlets began to report that Tyler had indeed signed with Fox.

At the band's August 12 show at Nikon at Jones Beach Theater in Wantagh, New York, Tyler accidentally hit Joe Perry in the head with his microphone stand during the end of "Sweet Emotion", not realizing that Perry had approached the drum riser that Tyler was standing on. In the ensuing incident, the injured Perry threw down his guitar in anger while Tyler was checking to see if he was OK and stormed off the stage, but returned to finish the concert.

At the band's August 17 show at the Air Canada Centre in Toronto, Tyler playfully bumped Perry while both were performing the second song "Love in an Elevator" on the catwalk. In retaliation, Perry playfully bumped Tyler back, but the bump caught Tyler off guard and Tyler tumbled off-stage into the audience. Tyler was previously injured in a fall off-stage in August 2009 which caused the rest of the band's Guitar Hero Aerosmith Tour to be canceled. Tyler was caught by members of the audience and crew and was helped back on-stage by Perry. In retaliation, Tyler spun Perry around and said "It ain't gonna happen again baby", then stated to Perry "You will pay for that, my brother". Later during the same concert, Tyler changed the lyrics of "Livin' on the Edge" to "We're seeing things in a different way/And Joe knows it ain't his".
