= List of awards and nominations received by Aerosmith =

Aerosmith awards and nominations
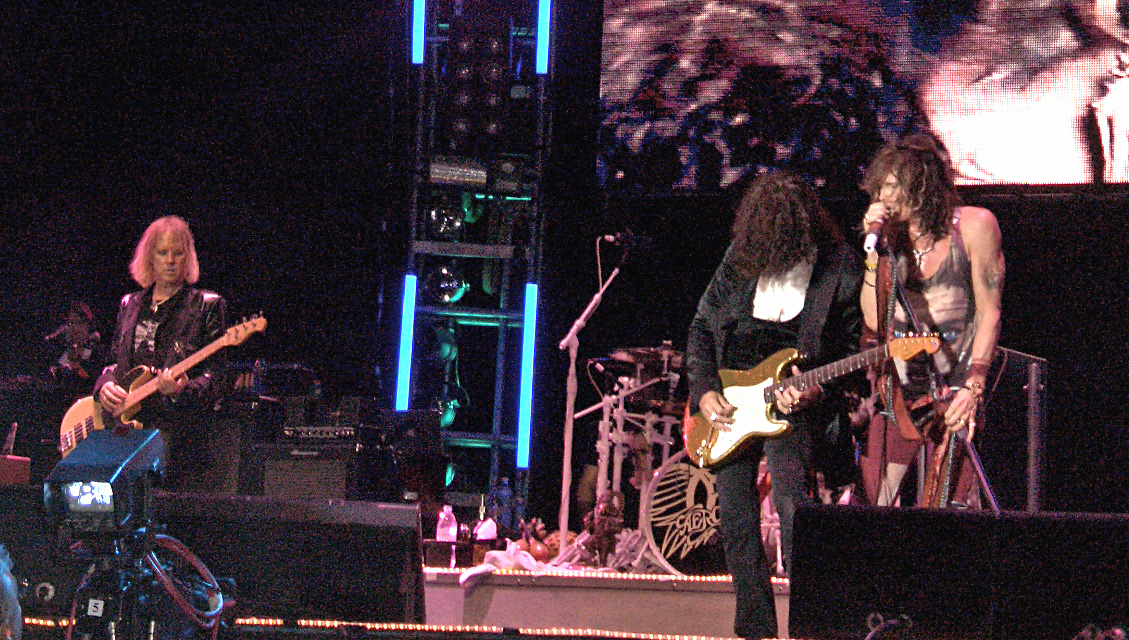
- Aerosmith performing in Buenos Aires, Argentina on April 15, 2007
Awards and nominations
Award	Wins	Nominations
American Music Awards	6	10
Billboard	4	5
Grammy	4	17
MTV Europe	2	6
MTV VMA	10	36
People's Choice	1	1
Soul Train	1	1
Teen Choice	2	2
Boston Music Awards	2	6
MTV Movie & TV Awards	1	1

Totals (Note: Certain award groups do not simply award one winner. They acknowledge several different recipients, have runners-up, and have third place. Since this is a specific recognition and is different from losing an award, runner-up mentions are considered wins in this award tally. For simplification and to avoid errors, each award in this list has been presumed to have had a prior nomination.)
- Wins: 37
- Nominations: 95

Aerosmith is an American Grammy Award-winning hard rock band formed in 1970 in Boston, Massachusetts. They have released 15 studio albums: Aerosmith (1973), Get Your Wings (1974), Toys in the Attic (1975), Rocks (1976), Draw the Line (1977), Night in the Ruts (1979), Rock in a Hard Place (1982), Done with Mirrors (1985), Permanent Vacation (1987), Pump (1989), Get a Grip (1993), Nine Lives (1997), Just Push Play (2001), Honkin' on Bobo (2004), and Music from Another Dimension! (2012). Each album was released by either the Columbia Records or Geffen Records record label.

Aerosmith has received ten MTV Video Music Awards and rank as the ninth most awarded artist (and the third most awarded group) of all time at that awards ceremony. Aerosmith is also the most awarded artist of all time in the categories Best Rock Video (with four such awards) and Viewer's Choice (with three such awards). Aerosmith has also won once each in the categories Video of the Year, Best Group Video, and Best Video from a Film. They have also received four Grammy Awards, all in the "Best Rock Performance by a Duo or Group with Vocal" category, for the songs "Janie's Got a Gun", "Livin' on the Edge", "Crazy", and "Pink" during four different ceremonies in 1990, 1994, 1995, and 1999, respectively. Aerosmith is second only to U2 in the number of awards won in that category. The band has been recognized in their native Boston, receiving the awards for "Outstanding Rock Band" and "Best Rock Video" in 1992 from the Boston Music Awards. Aerosmith has also collected six American Music Awards, four Billboard Music Awards, two People's Choice Awards, and many other awards and honors. Overall, Aerosmith has received 34 awards from 86 nominations.

== ASCAP Pop Music Awards ==
The annual ASCAP Pop Music Awards honors the songwriters and publishers of the most performed pop songs.

Year	Nominee / work	Award	Result
2002	"Jaded"	Most Performed Song	Won

== American Music Awards ==
The American Music Awards is an annual awards ceremony created by Dick Clark in 1973. Aerosmith has received six awards from ten nominations.

Year	Nominee / work	Award	Result
1990	Aerosmith	Favorite Heavy Metal/Hard Rock Artist	Nominated
1991	Aerosmith	Favorite Pop/Rock Band, Duo, or Group	Won
1991	Aerosmith	Favorite Heavy Metal Artist	Won
1991	Pump	Favorite Heavy Metal/Hard Rock Album	Nominated
1994	Aerosmith	Favorite Pop/Rock Band/Duo/Group	Won
1994	Aerosmith	Favorite Heavy Metal/Hard Rock Artist	Won
1998	Aerosmith	Favorite Pop/Rock Band, Duo, or Group	Won
1999	Aerosmith	Favorite Pop/Rock Band	Nominated
2000	Aerosmith	International Artist Award	Won

== BMI Pop Awards ==
Broadcast Music, Inc. (BMI) is one of three United States performing rights organizations, along with ASCAP and SESAC. It collects license fees on behalf of songwriters, composers, and music publishers and distributes them as royalties to those members whose works have been performed.

Year	Nominee / work	Award	Result
2002	"Jaded"	Award-Winning Song	Won

== Billboard Music Awards ==
The Billboard Music Awards are sponsored by Billboard magazine and is held annually in December. Aerosmith has received four awards from five nominations.

Year	Nominee / work	Award	Result
1990	Aerosmith	Rock Album Artist	Won
1994	Aerosmith	#1 Rock Artist	Won
1998	"Pink"	Best Clip (Hard Rock/Metal)	Nominated
1999	Aerosmith	Artist Achievement Award	Won
2001	"Jaded"	Best Hard Rock Clip of the Year	Won

== Boston Music Awards ==
The Boston Music Awards are an annual awards show held in Boston, Massachusetts. Aerosmith has received two awards from six nominations.

Year	Nominee / work	Award	Result
1992	Aerosmith	Outstanding Rock Band	Won
1992	Aerosmith	Best Rock Video	Won
1999	"I Don't Want to Miss a Thing"	Video of the Year	Nominated
1999	Aerosmith	Act of the Year	Nominated
1999	Aerosmith	Rock Band of the Year	Nominated
2001	"Angel's Eye"	Single of the Year	Nominated

== Fryderyk ==
The Fryderyk is a music award ceremony presented by Polish Society of the Phonographic Industry since 1995. Aerosmith has been nominated three times.

Year	Nominee / work	Award	Result
1995	Get a Grip	Best Foreign Album on Polish Market	Nominated
1995	Aerosmith concert in Warsaw (Get a Grip Tour)	Concert of the Year	Nominated
1995	Aerosmith concert in Warsaw (Get a Grip Tour)	Event of the Year	Nominated

== GAFFA Awards ==
=== Denmark GAFFA Awards ===
Delivered since 1991, the GAFFA Awards are a Danish award that rewards popular music by the magazine of the same name.

Year	Nominee / work	Award	Result	Ref.
1994	Aerosmith	Foreign Name	Won	
1994	Aerosmith	Foreign Live Name	Won	

== Grammy Awards ==
The Grammy Awards are awarded annually by the National Academy of Recording Arts and Sciences of the United States. Aerosmith has received four awards from 17 nominations.

Year	Nominee / work	Award	Result
1990	"Love in an Elevator"	Best Hard Rock Performance	Nominated
1991	"Janie's Got a Gun"	Best Rock Performance by a Duo or Group with Vocal	Won
1994	"Livin' on the Edge"	Best Rock Performance by a Duo or Group with Vocal	Won
1994	"Livin' on the Edge"	Best Rock Song	Nominated
1994	"Cryin'"	Best Rock Song	Nominated
1994	"Boogie Man"	Best Rock Instrumental Performance	Nominated
1995	"Crazy"	Best Rock Performance by a Duo or Group with Vocal	Won
1998	"Falling in Love (Is Hard on the Knees)"	Best Rock Performance by a Duo or Group with Vocal	Nominated
1998	Nine Lives	Best Rock Album	Nominated
1999	"Pink"	Best Rock Performance by a Duo or Group with Vocal	Won
1999	"Pink"	Best Music Video, Short Form	Nominated
1999	"I Don't Want to Miss a Thing"	Best Pop Performance by a Duo or Group with Vocal	Nominated
2002	"Jaded"	Best Rock Performance by a Duo or Group with Vocal	Nominated
2002	"Jaded"	Best Rock Song	Nominated
2002	"Fly Away From Here"	Best Music Video, Short Form	Nominated
2002	Just Push Play	Best Rock Album	Nominated
2003	"Girls of Summer"	Best Rock Performance by a Duo or Group with Vocal	Nominated

Aerosmith was honored as MusiCares Person of the Year in 2020.

== MTV Europe Music Awards ==
The MTV Europe Music Awards is an annual awards ceremony established in 1994 by MTV Europe. Aerosmith has received two awards.

Year	Nominee / work	Award	Result
1994	Aerosmith	Best Rock	Won
1994	Aerosmith	Best Group	Nominated
1994	"Cryin'"	Best Song	Nominated
1997	Aerosmith	Best Rock	Nominated
1997	Aerosmith	Best Live Act	Nominated
1998	Aerosmith	Best Rock	Won

== MTV Movie Awards ==
The MTV Movie Awards is a film awards show presented annually on the MTV television network. Aerosmith has received one nomination.

Year	Nominee / work	Award	Result
1999	"I Don't Want To Miss A Thing"	Best Song	Nominated

== MTV Video Music Awards ==
The MTV Video Music Awards is an annual awards ceremony established in 1984 by MTV. Aerosmith has received 10 awards from 36 nominations.

Year	Nominee / work	Award	Result
1988	"Dude (Looks Like a Lady)"	Best Group Video	Nominated
1988	"Dude (Looks Like a Lady)"	Best Stage Performance in a Video	Nominated
1989	"Rag Doll"	Best Heavy Metal Video	Nominated
1990	"Janie's Got a Gun"	Best Metal/Hard Rock Video	Won
1990	"Janie's Got a Gun"	Viewer's Choice	Won
1990	"Janie's Got a Gun"	Video of the Year	Nominated
1990	"Janie's Got a Gun"	Best Group Video	Nominated
1990	"Janie's Got a Gun"	Best Direction in a Video	Nominated
1990	"Janie's Got a Gun"	Best Art Direction in a Video	Nominated
1990	"Janie's Got a Gun"	Best Editing in a Video	Nominated
1990	"Janie's Got a Gun"	Best Cinematography in a Video	Nominated
1991	"The Other Side"	Best Metal/Hard Rock Video	Won
1991	Things That Go Pump in the Night	Best Long Form Video	Nominated
1993	"Livin' on the Edge"	Viewer's Choice	Won
1993	"Livin' on the Edge"	Video of the Year	Nominated
1993	"Livin' on the Edge"	Best Metal/Hard Rock Video	Nominated
1993	"Livin' on the Edge"	Breakthrough Video	Nominated
1993	"Livin' on the Edge"	Best Special Effects in a Video	Nominated
1993	"Livin' on the Edge"	Best Art Direction in a Video	Nominated
1994	"Cryin'"	Video of the Year	Won
1994	"Cryin'"	Viewer's Choice	Won
1994	"Cryin'"	Best Group Video	Won
1994	"Cryin'"	Best Metal/Hard Rock Video	Nominated
1994	"Amazing"	Best Direction in a Video	Nominated
1994	"Amazing"	Best Special Effects in a Video	Nominated
1994	"Amazing"	Best Art Direction in a Video	Nominated
1994	"Amazing"	Best Editing in a Video	Nominated
1994	"Amazing"	Best Cinematography in a Video	Nominated
1997	"Falling in Love (Is Hard on the Knees)"	Best Rock Video	Won
1998	"Pink"	Best Rock Video	Won
1998	"Pink"	Best Special Effects in a Video	Nominated
1998	"I Don't Want to Miss a Thing"	Best Video from a Film	Won
1998	"I Don't Want to Miss a Thing"	Best Editing in a Video	Nominated
2001	"Jaded"	Best Rock Video	Nominated
2001	"Jaded"	Best Art Direction in a Video	Nominated
2001	"Jaded"	Best Cinematography in a Video	Nominated

== MTV Video Music Brazil ==
The MTV Video Music Brazil (VMB) are MTV Brazil's annual award ceremony, established in 1995.

Year	Nominee / work	Award	Result
2002	"Fly Away from Here"	Best International Video	Nominated

== People's Choice Awards ==
The People's Choice Awards is an awards show that has been held annually since 1975. Aerosmith has received two awards.

Year	Nominee / work	Award	Result
1994	Aerosmith	Favorite Rock Group	Won
1999	Aerosmith	Favorite Musical Group	Won

== Soul Train Music Awards ==
The Soul Train Music Awards is annual award show that honors the best in black music and entertainment. It has been held annually since 1987. Aerosmith has received one award, which they shared with Run-D.M.C.

Year	Nominee / work	Award	Result
1987	"Walk This Way" (Run-D.M.C. and Aerosmith)	Best Rap – Single	Won

== Teen Choice Awards ==
The Teen Choice Awards is an awards show presented annually by the Fox Broadcasting Company. Aerosmith has received two awards.

Year	Nominee / work	Award	Result
1999	"I Don't Want to Miss a Thing"	Choice Love Song	Won
2001	"Jaded"	Choice Rock Track	Won

== Tony Awards ==
The Antoinette Perry Award for Excellence in Theatre, more commonly known informally as the Tony Award, recognizes achievement in live Broadway theatre. The awards are presented by the American Theatre Wing and The Broadway League at an annual ceremony in New York City.

Year	Recipient	Award	Result
2018	SpongeBob SquarePants	Best Original Score	Nominated

== ZD Awards ==
Zvukovaya Dorozhka (Russian: Звуковая Дорожка, "sound track") is Russia's oldest hit parade in field of popular music. Since 2003 it is presented in a ceremony in concert halls. It's considered one of the major Russian music awards.

Year	Nominee / work	Award	Result	Ref.
2015	Blue Army Tour (live at Lubyanka Square)	Tour of the Year	Nominated	
