= Aerosmith/ZZ Top Tour =

2009 concert tour by Aerosmith and ZZ Top

- Tour by Aerosmith and ZZ Top
- Location: North America
- Start date: June 10, 2009
- End date: August 5, 2009
- Legs: 1
- No. of shows: Scheduled: 42 + 3 (post-tour); Played: 15 + 4 (post-tour)
Aerosmith tour chronology
Aerosmith World Tour 2007 (2007)	Aerosmith/ZZ Top Tour (2009)	Cocked, Locked, Ready to Rock Tour (2010)
ZZ Top tour chronology
European Tour 2009 (2009)	Aerosmith/ZZ Top Tour (2009)	Necessity Is a Mother Tour (2009)

The Aerosmith/ZZ Top Tour, sometimes referred to as the A to Z Tour or Guitar Hero: Aerosmith Tour, was a concert tour headlined by American hard rock bands Aerosmith and ZZ Top. The tour, presented by Guitar Hero: Aerosmith, took place in the summer of 2009 until it had to be cancelled unexpectedly due to shoulder injuries sustained by Aerosmith frontman Steven Tyler.

For the first seven dates of the tour, Aerosmith played the entire Toys in the Attic album at every show, with the exception of the last track, "You See Me Crying". On June 26, 2009, while in Wantagh, New York's Jones Beach Theater, Aerosmith played "You See Me Crying", for the first time in the band's history; it was also the first time on the tour that every song on Toys in the Attic was played. Additionally, this tour marked the first time that the band performed "Round and Round" live.

Other notable highlights of the show included guitarist Joe Perry singing lead vocals on "Combination", a deep-cut from the Rocks album, and playing against the animated version of himself in the Guitar Hero: Aerosmith video game. The tour also featured a select one or two fans at each show playing a song from Guitar Hero: Aerosmith live on-stage before the concert.

ZZ Top was the co-headlining act for the tour, with 3 Doors Down opening the first two shows in Maryland Heights, Missouri and East Troy, Wisconsin, and Dropkick Murphys opening the Mansfield, Massachusetts show, as ZZ Top could not perform for the first three shows due to prior commitments. Several dates were canceled mid-tour after Steven Tyler injured his leg in Uncasville, Connecticut. Additionally, guitarist Brad Whitford and bassist Tom Hamilton had to sit out several of the dates due to injuries or surgeries; Whitford and Hamilton had substitutes perform in their places. Saving Abel opened for Aerosmith at their August 5 show in Sturgis, South Dakota, but Aerosmith cancelled the rest of the tour after Tyler fell off the stage in Sturgis. The band played three more shows in October and November after Tyler recovered, while ZZ Top booked alternate tour dates and venues and remained on tour alone for much of the rest of the year.

== History ==
=== Background ===
Steven Tyler announced on VH1 Classic Radio on September 4, 2008, that Aerosmith intended to enter the studio at the end of September 2008 to complete the band's 15th studio album. Tyler also confirmed that the band planned to begin a new US tour in June 2009, in support of the as-yet-untitled album. This tour was supposed to be preceded by a concert in Venezuela on February 1, 2009. However, on January 15, 2009, Tyler said the band would be unable to play the gig because of a second knee injury of guitarist Joe Perry. In mid-February 2009, it was announced that the album would be produced by the famed Brendan O'Brien and that the album would likely be recorded live, like their earlier records. Although the band had hoped to finish the album before the tour started in June 2009, Perry said that the group "realized there wasn't any chance of getting [the album] finished before we hit the road for the summer". The tour featured ZZ Top as the opening act for most of its performances. The Aerosmith/ZZ Top Tour, presented by Guitar Hero: Aerosmith, was officially announced and the first dates released on April 8, 2009.

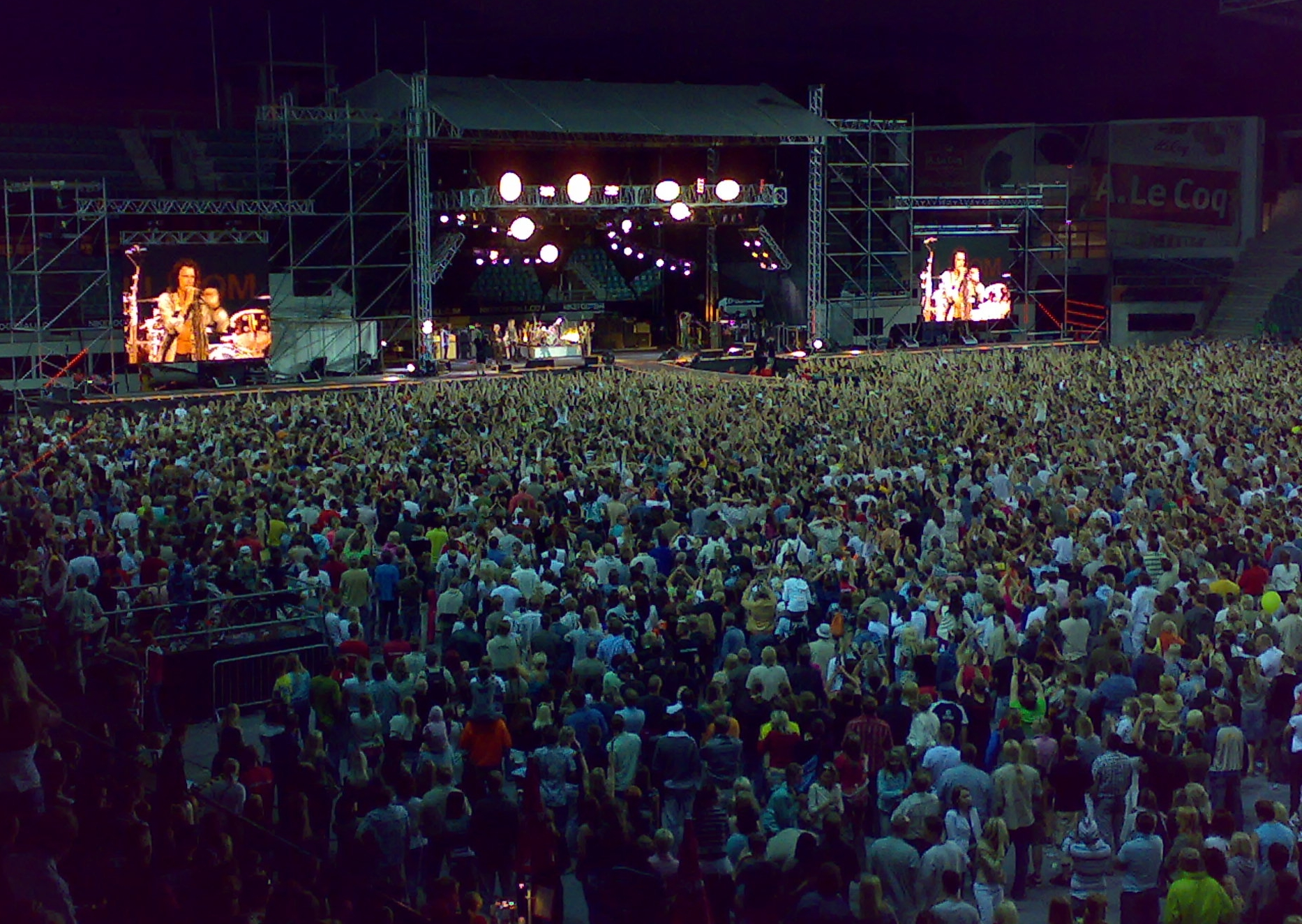
Aerosmith performing in Tallinn, Estonia, on July 5, 2007

The tour was slated to take the band across North America from June to September 2009. The Aerosmith/ZZ Top Tour represented the first time that Aerosmith and ZZ Top had performed on the same stage in 33 years.

=== Tour and incidents ===
The tour featured the band performing nearly all of the songs on their 1975 album Toys in the Attic during the first seven dates, and also featured Joe Perry sing lead vocals on the 1976 "Combination". The band was plagued with several health problems, over the course of the summer, however. Guitarist Brad Whitford had to sit out the first seven dates of the tour in order to recover from head surgery, after injuring his head getting out of his car. On June 28, 2009, at the band's seventh show of the tour at the Mohegan Sun Arena in Uncasville, Connecticut, lead singer Steven Tyler injured his leg, which required seven shows to be postponed. A review of the Mohegan Sun show noted that Tyler "seemed frustrated by the sound and plagued by mic troubles, which caused him to disappear under the stage and miss his cues".

As soon as the band resumed the tour on July 15, Whitford returned to the fold. However, Tom Hamilton had to depart in order to recover from non-invasive surgery. David Hull filled in for Hamilton until he recovered. On August 5, 2009, at a concert in Sturgis, South Dakota, Tyler fell off the catwalk midway through the concert while dancing to entertain fans during a break in the show due to sound system failure. He was helped up by security staff and taken backstage, before guitarist Joe Perry told the audience the show was over. Tyler was airlifted to Rapid City Regional Hospital, where he received treatment for head and neck injuries and a broken shoulder. In the wake of Tyler's injuries, the band was forced to postpone five shows in Western Canada. On August 14, 2009, Aerosmith announced that they had decided to cancel the rest of their US tour dates with ZZ Top, due to Tyler's injuries. One of the cancelled dates was for 107.7 (KSAN) FM's tenth annual "Bone Bash" concert event, which was cancelled in its entirety.

=== Post-cancellation developments ===
Within days after Aerosmith's withdrawal, ZZ Top issued a press release stating in part that it would immediately begin setting new tour dates, for which "routing will take ZZ Top to many of the markets that had been on that cancelled tour's itinerary, giving fans a second chance, in a manner of speaking, to see the band after all". ZZ Top "almost immediately began booking new gigs" entering into a "continuation tour" for the following several months. ZZ Top also made up for the missed Bone Bash concert in 2010, playing the date as the headliner with .38 Special opening.

In the midst of the tour, Perry completed work on his fifth solo album, Have Guitar, Will Travel and drummer Joey Kramer released his autobiography, Hit Hard. Perry's solo album was released on October 6, 2009. with one source noting that "it was the cancellation of the Aerosmith's tour because of lead singer Steven Tyler's stage accident that propelled Perry to finish his fifth solo effort".

In October, with Tyler having recovered from his injuries, Aeorsmith returned to performing with a previously schedule private appearance for Oracle in San Francisco. Two shows were then played in Hawaii, one in Maui and one in Honolulu, with the show in Maui being played as part of a legal settlement after the band was sued for cancelling a performance there in 2007. In early November, the band played a concert in Abu Dhabi, United Arab Emirates, at the Grand Prix.

Relations between Tyler and Perry soured in wake of Tyler falling off the stage in Sturgis and reached a fever pitch in November when a heavily publicized feud erupted in which Tyler was supposedly going to leave the band and be replaced by another singer. On November 9, 2009, the media reported that Tyler had no contact with the other members of Aerosmith and that they were unsure if he was still in the band. On November 10, 2009, Joe Perry confirmed Tyler had quit Aerosmith to pursue a solo career and was unsure whether the move was indefinite. No replacement was announced. Despite rumors of leaving the band, and notwithstanding Perry's comment as reported earlier the same day, Tyler joined the Joe Perry Project onstage November 10, 2009, at the Fillmore New York at Irving Plaza and performed "Walk This Way". According to sources at the event, Tyler assured the crowd that despite rumors to the contrary, he is "not quitting Aerosmith". Tensions cooled after Tyler returned from rehab, where he was seeking treatment for an addiction to painkillers, and the band announced a world tour to take place in 2010, entitled the Cocked, Locked, Ready to Rock Tour. That tour would ultimately play in many locations that the band missed due to the cancellation of dates on 2009 tour.

== Personnel ==
=== Aerosmith ===
- Steven Tyler – lead vocals, harmonica, piano
- Joe Perry – guitar, backing vocals, talkbox (on "Sweet Emotion"), pedal steel guitar (on "Rag Doll"), lead vocals (on "Combination")
- Brad Whitford – guitar
- Tom Hamilton – bass
- Joey Kramer – drums, percussion

Additional personnel:

- Russ Irwin – keyboards, backing vocals
- Bobby Schneck – guitar (substituted for Brad Whitford, June 10 – June 28)
- David Hull – bass (substituted for Tom Hamilton, July 15 – August 5)

=== ZZ Top ===
- Billy Gibbons – vocals, guitar
- Dusty Hill – bass, keyboards, vocals
- Frank Beard – drums, percussion

== Tour dates ==
Tour dates announced as of April 2009 included:

Date	City	Country	Venue
June 10, 2009	Maryland Heights	United States	Verizon Wireless Amphitheater (ZZ Top did not appear; 3 Doors Down was the opening act)
June 13, 2009	East Troy	United States	Alpine Valley Music Theatre (ZZ Top did not appear; 3 Doors Down was the opening act)
June 16, 2009	Mansfield	United States	Comcast Center (ZZ Top did not appear; Dropkick Murphys was the opening act)
June 21, 2009	Bristow	United States	Nissan Pavilion
June 24, 2009	Burgettstown	United States	Post-Gazette Pavilion
June 26, 2009	Wantagh	United States	Nikon at Jones Beach Theater
June 28, 2009	Uncasville	United States	Mohegan Sun Arena
July 1, 2009	Cincinnati	United States	~~Riverbend Music Center~~ CANCELED
July 3, 2009	Hershey	United States	~~Hersheypark Stadium~~ CANCELED
July 5, 2009	Virginia Beach	United States	~~Verizon Wireless Amphitheater~~ CANCELED
July 7, 2009	Raleigh	United States	~~The Time Warner Cable Music Pavilion at Walnut Creek~~ CANCELED
July 9, 2009	Charlotte	United States	~~Verizon Wireless Amphitheatre~~ CANCELED
July 11, 2009	Tampa	United States	~~Ford Amphitheatre~~ CANCELED
July 13, 2009	Sunrise	United States	~~BankAtlantic Center~~ CANCELED
July 15, 2009	Atlanta	United States	Lakewood Amphitheatre
July 17, 2009	The Woodlands	United States	Cynthia Woods Mitchell Pavilion
July 19, 2009	Dallas	United States	SuperPages.com Center
July 25, 2009	Paradise	United States	MGM Grand Garden Arena
July 27, 2009	Phoenix	United States	Cricket Wireless Pavilion
July 30, 2009	Tulsa	United States	BOK Center
August 1, 2009	Greenwood Village	United States	Fiddler's Green Amphitheatre
August 5, 2009	Sturgis	United States	Buffalo Chip at Sturgis Bike Rally (ZZ Top did not appear; Saving Abel was the opening act; show CANCELED mid-way when Tyler falls off stage)
August 7, 2009	Winnipeg	Canada	~~Canad Inns Stadium~~ CANCELED
August 9, 2009	Regina	Canada	~~Mosaic Stadium at Taylor Field~~ CANCELED
August 11, 2009	Edmonton	Canada	~~Commonwealth Stadium~~ CANCELED
August 13, 2009	Calgary	Canada	~~McMahon Stadium~~ CANCELED
August 15, 2009	Vancouver	Canada	~~BC Place Stadium~~ CANCELED
August 17, 2009	Auburn	United States	~~White River Amphitheatre~~ CANCELED
August 19, 2009	Concord	United States	~~Sleep Train Pavilion (Bone Bash 10)~~ CANCELED
August 21, 2009	Los Angeles	United States	~~Staples Center~~ CANCELED
August 23, 2009	Irvine	United States	~~Verizon Wireless Amphitheatre~~ CANCELED
August 28, 2009	Tinley Park	United States	~~First Midwest Bank Amphitheatre~~ CANCELED
August 30, 2009	Noblesville	United States	~~Verizon Wireless Music Center~~ CANCELED
September 1, 2009	Kansas City	United States	~~Sprint Center~~ CANCELED
September 3, 2009	Toronto	Canada	~~Air Canada Centre~~ CANCELED
September 5, 2009	Ottawa	Canada	~~Scotiabank Place~~ CANCELED
September 8, 2009	Saint Paul	United States	~~Xcel Energy Center~~ CANCELED
September 10, 2009	Cuyahoga Falls	United States	~~Blossom Music Center~~ CANCELED
September 12, 2009	Holmdel	United States	~~PNC Bank Arts Center~~ CANCELED
September 14, 2009	New York City	United States	~~Madison Square Garden~~ CANCELED
September 16, 2009	Auburn Hills	United States	~~The Palace of Auburn Hills~~ CANCELED
September 18, 2009	Camden	United States	~~Susquehanna Bank Center~~ CANCELED
Post-tour shows
October 14, 2009	San Francisco	United States	Treasure Island (private show for Oracle)
October 18, 2009	Honolulu	United States	Blaisdell Center
October 20, 2009	Wailuku	United States	War Memorial Stadium (rescheduled from 2007 as part of a legal settlement)
November 1, 2009	Abu Dhabi	United Arab Emirates	Yas Marina Circuit (2009 Abu Dhabi Grand Prix)

ZZ Top continuation tour dates picked up after Aerosmith's departure included September 9 at South Bend, Indiana, Roanoke, Virginia on September 11, and nine shows in Canadian cities between November 17 and December 1.

== Set ==
=== ZZ Top Set list ===
- 1. "Got Me Under Pressure"
- 2. "Waitin' for the Bus"
- 3. "Jesus Just Left Chicago"
- 4. "Pincushion"
- 5. "Cheap Sunglasses"
- 6. "I Need You Tonight"
- 7. "Heard It on the X"
- 8. "Just Got Paid"
- 9. "Gimme All Your Lovin'"
- 10. "Sharp Dressed Man"
- 11. "Legs"
- 12. "La Grange"
- 13. "Tush"

=== Aerosmith performed songs ===
Below is a list of songs played on the tour:

Album	Song	Times
Aerosmith (1973)	"Dream On"	11
Aerosmith (1973)	"Mama Kin"	2
Aerosmith (1973)	"Walkin' the Dog"	7
Get Your Wings (1974)	"Train Kept A-Rollin'"	13
Get Your Wings (1974)	"Lord of the Thighs"	1
Get Your Wings (1974)	"Same Old Song and Dance"	4
Toys in the Attic (1975)	"Toys in the Attic"	7
Toys in the Attic (1975)	"Uncle Salty"	7
Toys in the Attic (1975)	"Adam's Apple"	7
Toys in the Attic (1975)	"Walk This Way"	13
Toys in the Attic (1975)	"Big Ten Inch Record"	7
Toys in the Attic (1975)	"Sweet Emotion"	11
Toys in the Attic (1975)	"No More No More"	7
Toys in the Attic (1975)	"Round and Round"	7
Toys in the Attic (1975)	"You See Me Crying"	1
Rocks (1976)	"Combination"	13
Rocks (1976)	"Last Child"	6
Rocks (1976)	"Back in the Saddle"	2
Draw the Line (1977)	"Draw the Line"	8
Sgt. Pepper's Lonely Hearts Club Band soundtrack (1978)	"Come Together"	6
Permanent Vacation (1987)	"Rag Doll"	7
Pump (1989)	"Love in an Elevator"	13
Pump (1989)	"Monkey on My Back"	1
Pump (1989)	"Janie's Got a Gun"	4
Get a Grip (1993)	"Eat the Rich"	6
Get a Grip (1993)	"Livin' on the Edge"	11
Get a Grip (1993)	"Cryin'"	12
Nine Lives (1997)	"Falling in Love (Is Hard on the Knees)"	6
Nine Lives (1997)	"Pink"	8
Armageddon: The Album (1998)	"I Don't Want to Miss a Thing"	2
Just Push Play (2001)	"Jaded"	4
Honkin' on Bobo (2004)	"Stop Messin' Around"	4
Non-Album Song/Cover	"Dirty Water"	1
Pandora's Box (1994)	"Rattlesnake Shake"	2

A typical setlist would look like this.

- 1. "Train Kept A Rollin'"
- 2. "Cryin'"
- 3. "Love In An Elevator"
- 4. "Jaded"
- 5. "Dream On"
- 6. "Combination"
- 7. "Toys In The Attic"
- 8. "Uncle Salty"
- 9. "Adam's Apple"
- 10. "Walk This Way"
- 11. "Big Ten Inch Record"
- 12. "Sweet Emotion"
- 13. "No More No More"
- 14. "Round And Round"
- 15. "Livin' On The Edge"

Encore:

- 1. "Dirty Water"
- 2. "Come Together"
