= Push Play (disambiguation) =

Push Play may refer to:

- Push Play, American pop/rock band from Long Island, NY
- Push Play (EP), a 2012 EP by Sara Niemietz
- "Push Play" (song), a song by Zedd featuring Miriam Bryant

== See also ==
- Just Push Play, 2001 album by Aerosmith
  - "Just Push Play" (song), title track from above album
  - Just Push Play Tour, tour by Aerosmith to coincide with the album
