= (It) Feels So Good =

Song

Single by Steven Tyler
- Released: May 10, 2011
- Genre: Pop rock, power pop
- Length: 3:31
- Label: Columbia
- Songwriters: Steven Tyler; Marti Frederiksen
- Producer: Marti Frederiksen

Steven Tyler singles chronology
| "Love Lives" (2010) | "(It) Feels So Good" (2011) | "Love Is Your Name" (2015) |

"(It) Feels So Good" is a song by Aerosmith frontman Steven Tyler. Written by Tyler and Marti Frederiksen, it features background vocals from American recording artist Nicole Scherzinger. It premiered on Ryan Seacrest's radio show on KIIS-FM in Los Angeles on May 9, 2011, and released digitally via iTunes and Amazon MP3 on May 10, 2011.

== Background ==
Originally titled "Oxygen", the track was written in 2002 throughout the making of Aerosmith's 'career-spanning compilation' O Yeah! Ultimate Aerosmith Hits and is in a similar vein to pop-orientated efforts such as Just Push Play. The band instead opted to record "Girls of Summer" and "Lay It Down". Tyler subsequently recorded a demo of the song, which later leaked to the Internet.

The cover photo was captured by Steve Erle. The logo used can be found on much of Tyler's clothing range (e.g. jackets, shirts, etc.), while the font is a similar style to that of the Aerosmith logo.

== Music video ==
The music video for the song was directed by Ray Kay. Kay, in the past has directed videos for Britney Spears, Lady Gaga, Melanie C, Justin Bieber and Adam Lambert. Filming took place in April 2011 and the world premiere took place on Thursday, 12 May 2011, on American Idol where Tyler was a member of the judging panel alongside Jennifer Lopez and Randy Jackson. It features Nicole Scherzinger, who also provides backing vocals.

Tyler performed the song in 2011 in Las Vegas, Nevada with Nicole Scherzinger on backing vocals, fellow Idol judge Randy Jackson playing bass guitar, and legendary British guitarist Jeff Beck.

== Cover versions ==
Tribute Mega Stars made an album with a cover of the song, an instrumental mix, an a cappella mix, a drums and vocals mix, and a mix with no drums.

== Chart performance ==
"(It) Feels So Good" made its debut on the Billboard Hot 100 at number 35, the highest-charting song by any member of Aerosmith since 2001's "Jaded". It also debuted at number 24 on Hot Digital Songs, with 77,000 downloads. As of 15 July 2011, the song has sold 197,000 copies.

== Charts ==
| Chart (2011) | Peak position |
|---|---|
| Canada Rock (Billboard) | 23 |
| US Billboard Hot 100 | 35 |
| US Adult Pop Airplay (Billboard) | 17 |
| US Pop Airplay (Billboard) | 37 |
