= O, Yeah! Ultimate Aerosmith Hits =

Greatest hits album by Aerosmith
- Released: July 2, 2002
- Recorded: 1972–2002
- Genres: Hard rock, blues rock
- Length: 131:39
- Label: Columbia/Geffen
- Producers: Aerosmith, Steven Tyler, Joe Perry, Glen Ballard, Adrian Barber, Ray Colcord, Jack Douglas, Bruce Fairbairn, Marti Frederiksen, Mark Hudson, Jason Mizell, Rick Rubin, Matt Serletic, DeVante Swing, Russell Simmons

Aerosmith compilation chronology
Young Lust: The Aerosmith Anthology (2001)	O, Yeah! Ultimate Aerosmith Hits (2002)	Devil's Got a New Disguise: The Very Best of Aerosmith (2006)

Alternative cover
- Lenticular cover

The Essential Aerosmith
- Front cover of the 2011 re-release

Singles from O, Yeah! Ultimate Aerosmith Hits
- 1. "Girls of Summer" Released: August 22, 2002

Professional ratings
Review scores
Source	Rating
AllMusic	4.5/5 stars
Rolling Stone	4.5/5 stars

O, Yeah! Ultimate Aerosmith Hits is a greatest hits album by American hard rock band Aerosmith, released in 2002 by Columbia Records and Geffen Records. A double-disc album, it includes 27 of the band's biggest hits in chronological order and spans the band's entire career to that point, but does not include any songs from the albums Night in the Ruts, Rock in a Hard Place, or Done With Mirrors. Aerosmith's collaboration with Run-DMC on "Walk This Way", however, is included, as are two new songs, "Girls of Summer" and "Lay It Down", which the band recorded in Hawaii.

O, Yeah! has since been certified triple platinum in the United States. Noticeable on the corners of album cover are the different variations of the Aerosmith logo used throughout the band's career.

O, Yeah! was re-released as The Essential Aerosmith on September 13, 2011. The album cover was changed, with a more straightforward profile picture of the band being used, and a limited edition bonus disc with six additional tracks was released, otherwise the track listing to the two CDs are the same.

== Track listing ==
Disc 1
No.	Title	Writer(s)	Length
1.	"Mama Kin" (from Aerosmith)	Steven Tyler	4:25
2.	"Dream On" (from Aerosmith)	Tyler	4:24
3.	"Same Old Song and Dance" (from Get Your Wings)	Tyler, Joe Perry	3:52
4.	"Seasons of Wither" (from Get Your Wings)	Tyler	5:25
5.	"Walk This Way" (from Toys in the Attic)	Tyler, Perry	3:39
6.	"Big Ten Inch Record" (from Toys in the Attic)	Fred Weismantel	2:12
7.	"Sweet Emotion" (from Toys in the Attic)	Tyler, Tom Hamilton	4:33
8.	"Last Child" (from Rocks)	Tyler, Brad Whitford	3:19
9.	"Back in the Saddle" (from Rocks)	Tyler, Perry	4:39
10.	"Draw the Line (remix)" (from Pandora's Box)	Tyler, Perry	3:45
11.	"Dude (Looks Like a Lady)" (from Permanent Vacation)	Tyler, Perry, Desmond Child	4:22
12.	"Angel" (from Permanent Vacation)	Tyler, Child	5:07
13.	"Rag Doll" (from Permanent Vacation)	Tyler, Perry, Jim Vallance, Holly Knight	4:23
14.	"Janie's Got a Gun" (from Pump)	Tyler, Hamilton	5:28
15.	"Love in an Elevator" (from Pump)	Tyler, Perry	5:21
16.	"What It Takes" (from Pump)	Tyler, Perry, Child	5:11
Total length:			70:03

Disc 2
No.	Title	Writer(s)	Length
1.	"The Other Side" (from Pump)	Tyler, Vallance, Brian Holland, Lamont Dozier, Edward Holland Jr.	4:04
2.	"Livin' on the Edge (Full length version)" (original version appeared on Get a Grip)	Tyler, Perry, Mark Hudson	6:20
3.	"Cryin'" (from Get a Grip)	Tyler, Perry, Taylor Rhodes	5:08
4.	"Amazing" (from Get a Grip)	Tyler, Richard Supa	5:55
5.	"Deuces Are Wild" (from The Beavis and Butt-head Experience, Big Ones)	Tyler, Vallance	3:36
6.	"Crazy" (from Get a Grip)	Tyler, Perry, Child	5:16
7.	"Falling in Love (Is Hard on the Knees)" (from Nine Lives)	Tyler, Perry, Glen Ballard	3:26
8.	"Pink (The South Beach Mix)" (original version from Nine Lives)	Tyler, Supa, Ballard	3:54
9.	"I Don't Want to Miss a Thing" (from Armageddon: The Album)	Diane Warren	4:58
10.	"Jaded" (from Just Push Play)	Tyler, Marti Frederiksen	3:34
11.	"Just Push Play (Radio remix)" (Original version appeared on Just Push Play)	Tyler, Hudson, Steve Dudas	3:11
12.	"Walk This Way (performed by Run-D.M.C. with Steven Tyler and Joe Perry)" (from Raising Hell by Run-D.M.C.)	Tyler, Perry	5:09
13.	"Girls of Summer" (New studio recording)	Tyler, Perry, Frederiksen	3:13
14.	"Lay It Down" (New studio recording)	Tyler, Perry, Donald DeGrate, Frederiksen	3:47
Total length:			61:36

Disc 2 - Bonus tracks on non-US editions
No.	Title	Writer(s)	Length
15.	"Come Together" (from the soundtrack of the film Sgt. Pepper's Lonely Hearts Club Band)	John Lennon, Paul McCartney	3:45
16.	"Theme from Spider-Man" (from the soundtrack of the film Spider-Man)	Paul Francis Webster, Robert Harris	2:58
17.	"Toys in the Attic" (from Toys in the Attic)	Tyler, Perry	3:05
Total length:			9:48

Disc 3 - The Essential Aerosmith 3.0 Only
No.	Title	Writer(s)	Length
1.	"Lord of the Thighs" (from Get Your Wings)	Tyler	4:14
2.	"Toys in the Attic" (from Toys in the Attic)	Tyler, Perry	3:07
3.	"You See Me Crying" (from Toys in the Attic)	Tyler, Don Solomon	5:12
4.	"Baby, Please Don't Go" (from Honkin' on Bobo)	Joe Williams	3:24
5.	"Devil's Got a New Disguise" (from Devil's Got a New Disguise - The Very Best of Aerosmith)	Tyler, Perry, Warren	4:27
6.	"Walk This Way (Live)" (from Rockin' the Joint (January 11, 2002 at The Joint, Las Vegas))	Tyler, Perry	4:23
Total length:			24:47

== Personnel ==
- Steven Tyler - lead vocals, keyboards, harmonica, percussion
- Tom Hamilton - bass
- Joey Kramer - drums, percussion
- Joe Perry - guitar, background vocals
- Brad Whitford - guitar

== Production ==
- Producers: Aerosmith, Glen Ballard, Adrian Barber, Ray Colcord, Jack Douglas, Bruce Fairbairn, Marti Frederiksen, Mark Hudson, Jason Mizell, Joe Perry, Rick Rubin, Matt Serletic, Russell Simmons, Steven Tyler
- Mixing producer: Don DeVito
- Mixing: Glen Ballard, Bob Clearmountain, Chris Fogel, Michael Fraser, Marti Frederiksen, Mark Hudson, Brendan O'Brien, Joe Perry, Mike Shipley, David Thoener, Steven Tyler
- Remixing: Marti Frederiksen, Steven Tyler
- Mastering: David Donnelly
- Arranger: Matt Serletic
- Music assistant: John Bionelli
- Instrument technician: Jim Survis
- Art direction: Sean Evans
- Artist coordination: Leslie Langlo
- Photography: Ross Halfin
- Logo: Will Kennedy

== Charts ==
=== Weekly charts ===
Weekly chart performance for O, Yeah! Ultimate Aerosmith Hits
Chart (2002)	Peak position
Dutch Albums (Album Top 100)	23
Finnish Albums (Suomen virallinen lista)	9
Irish Albums (IRMA)	20
Italian Albums (FIMI)	35
Scottish Albums (Official Charts)	3
Swiss Albums (Schweizer Hitparade)	90
UK Albums (Official Charts)	2
UK Rock & Metal Albums (Official Charts)	6
US Billboard 200	4

=== Year-end charts ===
Year-end chart performance for O, Yeah! Ultimate Aerosmith Hits
Chart (2002)	Position
Canadian Metal Albums (Nielsen SoundScan)	36
UK Albums (OCC)	175
US Billboard 200	124

=== Singles ===
Year	Single	Chart	Position
2002	"Girls of Summer"	Mainstream Rock Tracks	25

== Certifications ==
Region	Certification	Certified units/sales
Japan (RIAJ)	Platinum	200,000^{^}
United Kingdom (BPI)	Silver	60,000^{^}
United States (RIAA)	3× Platinum	3,000,000^{‡}
^{^} Shipments figures based on certification alone.^{‡} Sales+streaming figures based on certification alone.

== Release history ==
Region	Date	Format	Tracks	Label	Catalog #	Barcode	Edition	Series	Notes
USA	Jul 2, 2002	CD x 2	30	Columbia/SMEI	C2K 86700	696998670020	—	—	Available in 4 different 3-D covers and 1 standard cover
USA	Jul 2, 2002	Cassette x 2	30	Columbia/SMEI	C2T 86700	696998670044	—	—	
USA	Jul 16, 2002	MiniDisc x 2	30	Columbia/SMEI	C2M 86700	696998670082	—	—	
USA	Aug 20, 2002	SACD x 2	30	Columbia/SMEI	C2S 86700	696998670068	—	—	stereo only
USA	Feb 1, 2008	MP3 256k	30	Columbia/SBME	C2K 86700	696998670020	—	—	7 indiv. tracks, 23 album only
USA	Jul 1, 2009	MP3 192k	30	Columbia/SME	C2K 86700	696998670020	—	—	7 indiv. tracks, 23 album only
USA	Oct 6, 2009	MP3 320k	30	Columbia/SME	C2K 86700	696998670020	—	—	7 indiv. tracks, 23 album only; approx. date; issued between Oct 6 - Nov 28, 2009
USA	Aug 30, 2011	CD x 3	36	Columbia/SME	88697 92339 2	886979233928	Limited Edition 3.0	The Essential	Re-titled: The Essential Aerosmith
USA	Sep 6, 2011	MP3 256k	30	Columbia/SME	88644 31571 1	886443157118	—	The Essential	Re-titled: The Essential Aerosmith; 18 indiv. tracks, 12 album only
USA	Sep 6, 2011	MP3 320k	30	Columbia/SME	88644 31571 1	886443157118	—	The Essential	Re-titled: The Essential Aerosmith
USA	Sep 6, 2011	AAC 256k	30	Columbia/SME	88644 31571 1	886443157118	—	The Essential	Re-titled: The Essential Aerosmith; 17 indiv. tracks, 13 album only
USA	Sep 13, 2011	CD x 2	30	Columbia/SME	88697 92210 2	886979221024	—	The Essential	Re-titled: The Essential Aerosmith
USA	Dec 2011	MP3 256k	30	Columbia/SME	C2K 86700	696998670020	—	—	18 indiv. tracks, 12 album only; approx. date; issued between Dec 6 - 21, 2011
