= Just Push Play Tour =

2001–02 concert tour by Aerosmith

- Tour by Aerosmith
- Cover of tour programme
- Associated album: Just Push Play
- Start date: June 1, 2001
- End date: February 3, 2002
- Legs: 5
- No. of shows: 70 in North America; 6 in Asia; 76 total

Aerosmith concert chronology
- Roar of the Dragon Tour (1999–2000); Just Push Play Tour (2001–2002); Girls of Summer Tour (2002)

The Just Push Play Tour was a concert tour by Aerosmith that took the band across North America and Japan. Supporting their 2001 album Just Push Play, it ran from June 2001 to February 2002.

The tour was successful, despite several cancellations due in part to the September 11 terrorist attacks. The tour earned $46.5 million from 56 shows in North America.

== Background ==
The tour came on the heels of the band's platinum album Just Push Play. Aerosmith was riding a wave of popularity, having played the Super Bowl XXXV Halftime Show, been inducted into the Rock and Roll Hall of Fame, and scored a Top 10 hit, all within the first half of the year.

Just prior to the start of the tour, the band performed a brief promo tour in Germany. They also performed at many radio festivals in the United States, including: "River Rave", "Zootopia" and the "Kiss Concert".

Tyler sang the National Anthem at the Indianapolis 500, and the team sponsored a car in the race.

As a result, many shows sold out and the band added arena dates through the fall and winter, even after a successful summer amphitheater tour. "If we couldn't get an audience[...]having made a record we truly believe in, then I guess we probably would turn around and say, 'It's been fun, but see ya.' But I tell you this: we wouldn't go without a big fucking fight."

=== United We Stand ===
The band played the United We Stand: What More Can I Give benefit concert at RFK Stadium in Washington, D.C., on October 21, 2001, alongside Michael Jackson, Mariah Carey, and other pop stars. The band had been uncertain whether to play the show due to scheduling conflicts and made the decision almost at the last minute. They took the stage in the afternoon, played four songs, then flew to Indianapolis for a concert that same night.

=== Cancellations ===
In the wake of the September 11 terrorist attacks, the band canceled the three shows after that (Virginia Beach, Camden, New Jersey, and Columbia, Maryland); all on the Eastern Seaboard, where the attacks had occurred. These shows were rescheduled. The band canceled a second show at Irvine, California earlier in the tour, due to a scheduling conflict with the filming of the video for "Sunshine."

=== Stage setup ===
The stage for the tour had a modern look, reflecting the aesthetic of Just Push Play and its cover. Most striking were the silver and white colors, as well as two curving staircases that met at a platform at the top. There, some of the most exciting moments took place, including the entrance of Steven Tyler and Joe Perry at the beginning of the show, as well as Tyler singing the eerie lyrics that open "Seasons of Wither"

The band set up a second smaller stage in the rear of outdoor pavilions to play for those in the lawn section. During the middle of the show, the band members would walk under heavy security to this stage to do a three-song set.

Tyler jokingly referred to this tour as the "Back on the Grass Tour": a reference to this auxiliary stage and a jab at those who claimed Aerosmith was using drugs again. Tyler especially targeted former manager Tim Collins, who had accused Aerosmith of relapsing before the band fired him in 1996. However, "Back On The Grass" was not an official name for the tour – just a joke Tyler repeated in interviews.

=== Song selection ===
The setlist featured as many as 25 songs. It varied show to show, as most Aerosmith setlists do, but usually included about half a dozen songs from Just Push Play as well a fair balance between their 70s classics and 80s and 90s hits.

== Broadcasts and recordings ==
In January 2002, the band played The Joint, a 2,000 seat venue within the Hard Rock Hotel and Casino. This show was recorded and parts of it were released as the band's fifth live album, a Dual Disc CD/DVD entitled Rockin' the Joint, released in 2005.

== Opening acts ==
- Fuel (North America, select dates)
- The Cult (North America, select dates)

== Setlist ==
The following setlist was obtained from the concert held on June 26, 2001, at the Tweeter Center for the Performing Arts in Mansfield, Massachusetts. It does not represent all concerts for the duration of the tour.

1. "Beyond Beautiful"
2. "Love in an Elevator"
3. "Jaded"
4. "Just Push Play"
5. "Big Ten Inch Record"
6. "Fly Away from Here"
7. "Pink"
8. "Mama Kin"
9. "Same Old Song and Dance"
10. "Dream On"
11. "Toys in the Attic"
12. "Angel's Eye"
13. "Draw the Line"
14. "Under My Skin"
15. "Seasons of Wither"
16. "Cryin'"
17. "I Don't Want to Miss a Thing"
18. "Walk This Way"
19. "Sweet Emotion"

Encore

20. "Livin' on the Edge"
21. "What It Takes"
22. "Train Kept A-Rollin'"

== Tour dates ==
List of 2001 concerts
Date	City	Country	Venue
June 6, 2001	Hartford	United States	ctnow.com Meadows Music Theatre
June 8, 2001	Saratoga Springs	United States	Saratoga Performing Arts Center
June 10, 2001	Holmdel Township	United States	PNC Bank Arts Center
June 12, 2001	Holmdel Township	United States	PNC Bank Arts Center
June 16, 2001	Wantagh	United States	Jones Beach Theater
June 17, 2001^{[A]}	Los Angeles	United States	Dodger Stadium
June 18, 2001	Wantagh	United States	Jones Beach Theater
June 20, 2001	Wantagh	United States	Jones Beach Theater
June 22, 2001	Hershey	United States	Hersheypark Stadium
June 24, 2001	Bristow	United States	Nissan Pavilion
June 26, 2001	Mansfield	United States	Tweeter Center for the Performing Arts
June 28, 2001	Mansfield	United States	Tweeter Center for the Performing Arts
June 30, 2001	Burgettstown	United States	Post-Gazette Pavilion
July 2, 2001	Toronto	Canada	Molson Amphitheatre
July 5, 2001	Tinley Park	United States	Tweeter Center
July 7, 2001	East Troy	United States	Alpine Valley Music Theatre
July 9, 2001	Noblesville	United States	Verizon Wireless Music Center
July 11, 2001	Columbus	United States	Polaris Amphitheater
July 13, 2001	Clarkston	United States	DTE Energy Music Theatre
July 15, 2001	Darien	United States	Darien Lake Performing Arts Center
July 17, 2001	Cuyahoga Falls	United States	Blossom Music Center
July 19. 2001	Maryland Heights	United States	Riverport Amphitheatre
July 21, 2001	Bonner Springs	United States	Sandstone Amphitheater
July 23, 2001	Greenwood Village	United States	Coors Amphitheatre
August 8, 2001	Mountain View	United States	Shoreline Amphitheatre
August 10, 2001	George	United States	The Gorge Amphitheatre
August 12, 2001	Sacramento	United States	Sacramento Valley Amphitheatre
August 14. 2001	Concord	United States	Chronicle Pavilion
August 16, 2001	Chula Vista	United States	Coors Amphitheatre
August 18, 2001	Las Vegas	United States	MGM Grand Garden Arena
August 20, 2001	Irvine	United States	Verizon Wireless Amphitheatre
August 24, 2001	San Bernardino	United States	Blockbuster Pavilion
August 26, 2001	Phoenix	United States	Cricket Pavilion
August 28, 2001	Selma	United States	Verizon Wireless Amphitheater
August 30, 2001	The Woodlands	United States	Cynthia Woods Mitchell Pavilion
September 1, 2001	Dallas	United States	Smirnoff Music Centre
September 3, 2001	New Orleans	United States	New Orleans Arena
September 5, 2001	Memphis	United States	Pyramid Arena
September 7, 2001	Cincinnati	United States	Riverbend Music Center
September 9, 2001	Charlotte	United States	Verizon Wireless Amphitheatre
September 17, 2001	Atlanta	United States	HiFi Buys Amphitheatre
September 19, 2001	Nashville	United States	AmSouth Amphitheatre
September 21, 2001	Raleigh	United States	Alltel Pavilion
September 23, 2001	West Palm Beach	United States	Mars Music Amphitheatre
September 25, 2001	Bristow	United States	Nissan Pavilion
September 27, 2001	Camden	United States	Tweeter Center
October 11, 2001	Calgary	Canada	Pengrowth Saddledome
October 13, 2001	Edmonton	Canada	Skyreach Centre
October 15, 2001	Minneapolis	United States	Target Center
October 17, 2001	Grand Forks	United States	Alerus Center
October 19, 2001	Ames	United States	Hilton Coliseum
October 21, 2001	Indianapolis	United States	Conseco Fieldhouse
October 23, 2001	Rosemont	United States	Allstate Arena
October 25, 2001	Auburn Hills	United States	The Palace of Auburn Hills
October 31, 2001	Montreal, Canada	United States	Molson Centre
November 12, 2001	New York City	United States	Madison Square Garden
November 15, 2001	East Rutherford	United States	Continental Airlines Arena
November 17, 2001	Manchester	United States	Verizon Wireless Arena
November 19, 2001	Uncasville	United States	Mohegan Sun Arena
November 27, 2001	Tampa	United States	Ice Palace
November 29, 2001	Sunrise	United States	National Car Rental Center
December 3, 2001	Champaign	United States	Assembly Hall
December 5, 2001	Dallas	United States	Reunion Arena
December 7, 2001	North Little Rock	United States	Alltel Arena
December 9, 2001	Oklahoma City	United States	Myriad Convention Center Arena

List of 2002 concerts
Date	City	Country	Venue
January 5, 2002	Denver	United States	Pepsi Center
January 7, 2002	Salt Lake City	United States	Delta Center
January 9, 2002	San Jose	United States	Compaq Center
January 11, 2002	Las Vegas	United States	The Joint
January 13, 2002	Inglewood	United States	Great Western Forum
January 15, 2002	Fresno	United States	Selland Arena
January 17, 2002	San Diego	United States	San Diego Sports Arena
January 25, 2002	Osaka	Japan	Osaka Dome
January 27, 2002	Osaka	Japan	Osaka Dome
January 29, 2002	Fukuoka	Japan	Fukuoka Dome
January 31, 2002	Nagoya	Japan	Nagoya Dome
February 2, 2002	Tokyo	Japan	Tokyo Dome
February 3, 2002	Tokyo	Japan	Tokyo Dome

Festivals and other miscellaneous performances
^{A} This concert was a part of "Wango Tango"

Cancellations and rescheduled shows

June 20, 2001	Camden, New Jersey	Tweeter Center	Rescheduled to July 15, 2001
July 2, 2001	Cincinnati, Ohio	Riverbend Music Center	Rescheduled to September 7, 2001
July 15, 2001	Camden, New Jersey	Tweeter Center	Rescheduled to September 13, 2001
August 8, 2001	Bend, Oregon	Les Schwab Amphitheater	Cancelled
August 22, 2001	Irvine, California	Verizon Wireless Amphitheatre	Cancelled
September 11, 2001	Virginia Beach, Virginia	GTE Virginia Beach Amphitheater	September 11 attacks
September 13, 2001	Camden, New Jersey	Tweeter Center	Rescheduled to September 27, 2001
September 15, 2001	Columbia, Maryland	Merriweather Post Pavilion	Rescheduled to September 25, 2001, and moved to the Nissan Pavilion in Bristow, Virginia
October 9, 2001	Vancouver, Canada	General Motors Place	Cancelled
October 27, 2001	Pittsburgh, Pennsylvania	Mellon Arena	Cancelled
October 29, 2001	Toronto, Canada	Air Canada Centre	Cancelled
November 2, 2001	Columbus, Ohio	Nationwide Arena	Moved to the Nutter Center in Fairborn, Ohio
November 2, 2001	Fairborn, Ohio	Nutter Center	Cancelled
November 4, 2001	Boston, Massachusetts	FleetCenter	Cancelled
November 6, 2001	Providence, Rhode Island	Dunkin' Donuts Center	Cancelled
November 8, 2001	Philadelphia, Pennsylvania	First Union Center	Cancelled
November 10, 2001	Lexington, Kentucky	Rupp Arena	Cancelled
November 25, 2001	Greensboro, North Carolina	Greensboro Coliseum	Cancelled
December 1, 2001	Birmingham, Alabama	BJCC Arena	Cancelled
December 11, 2001	St. Louis, Missouri	Savvis Center	Cancelled
December 13, 2001	Kansas City, Missouri	Kemper Arena	Cancelled
December 15, 2001	Moline, Illinois	The Mark of the Quad Cities	Cancelled
December 17, 2001	Cleveland, Ohio	Gund Arena	Cancelled

=== Box office score data ===
Venue	City	Tickets sold / Available	Gross revenue
PNC Bank Arts Center	Holmdel Township	29,727 / 33,665 (88%)	$1,599,348
Hersheypark Stadium	Hershey	28,871 / 29,208 (99%)	$1,328,204
Nissan Pavilion	Bristow	36,302 / 45,067 (81%)	$1,657,585
Post-Gazette Pavilion	Burgettstown	23,050 / 23,188 (99%)	$851,196
Tweeter Center	Tinley Park	24,216 / 28,589 (85%)	$1,118,793
The Gorge Amphitheatre	George	20,000 / 20,000 (100%)	$942,010
MGM Grand Garden Arena	Las Vegas	13,235 / 13,235 (100%)	$921,155
New Orleans Arena	New Orleans	14,983 / 16,434 (91%)	$850,570
Riverbend Music Center	Cincinnati	20,479 / 20,500 (~100%)	$764,470
AmSouth Amphitheatre	Nashville	15,720 / 17,209 (91%)	$732,567
Alltel Pavilion	Raleigh	17,542 / 20,000 (88%)	$788,536
Mars Music Amphitheatre	West Palm Beach	18,645 / 19,706 (95%)	$770,940
Tweeter Center	Camden	23,497 / 24,930 (94%)	$890,921
Skyreach Centre	Edmonton	12,031 / 16,778 (72%)	$742,569
The Palace of Auburn Hills	Auburn Hills	16,309 / 16,309 (100%)	$855,069
Ice Palace	Tampa	15,086 / 16,299 (93%)	$855,577
Reunion Arena	Dallas	11,520 / 12,427 (93%)	$674,425
Pepsi Center	Denver	11,476 / 20,441 (56%)	$603,936
Delta Center	Salt Lake City	11,798 / 18,168 (65%)	$562,515
Compaq Center	San Jose	12,502 / 17,116 (73%)	$700,515
The Joint	Las Vegas	1,933 / 1,933 (100%)	$369,525
Great Western Forum	Inglewood	14,668 / 17,116 (86%)	$821,342
Selland Arena	Fresno	10,103 / 10,103 (100%)	$528,129
San Diego Sports Arena	San Diego	9,069 / 15,059 (60%)	$432,420
TOTAL		412,762 / 473,480 (87%)	$20,362,317
