= Girls of Summer (disambiguation) =

"Girls of Summer" is a single by Aerosmith.

Girls of Summer may also refer to:

- The Girls of Summer (2020 film), a film directed by John D. Hancock
- Satisfaction (1988 film), a film also known as Girls of Summer
- A 1956–1957 Broadway play, Girls of Summer, directed by Jack Garfein and starring Shelley Winters
