= Just Push Play (song) =

2001 single by Aerosmith

Single by Aerosmith

from the album Just Push Play
- Released: April 17, 2001
- Genre: Rap metal
- Length: 3:51 (album version); 3:17 (radio remix)
- Label: Columbia
- Songwriters: Steven Tyler; Mark Hudson; Steve Dudas
- Producers: Steven Tyler; Joe Perry; Marti Frederiksen; Mark Hudson

Aerosmith singles chronology
"Jaded" (2001)	"Just Push Play" (2001)	"Fly Away from Here" (2001)

"Just Push Play" is a song by American rock band Aerosmith, taken from their 13th studio album of the same name (2001). The song was written by Steven Tyler, Mark Hudson, and Steve Dudas. It was released as a single on April 17, 2001, peaking at number 10 on the US Billboard Mainstream Rock Tracks chart. Following its usage in Dodge Ram advertisements, "Just Push Play" was added to pop radio in November 2001 and reached number 38 on the Billboard Mainstream Top 40 chart.

== In other media ==
The song was performed heavily on Aerosmith's Just Push Play Tour and was also featured in Dodge Ram commercials, during the band's 2001 partnership with the car company. The song was also played during Aerosmith's performance at the historic United We Stand: What More Can I Give benefit concert in October 2001. The track was also included in Aerosmith's 2002 career-spanning compilation O, Yeah! Ultimate Aerosmith Hits, but was a radio-edit version of the track instead of the original. In 2024, American TV network FOX used the song in television spots to promote both The Masked Singer and The Floor. These spots aired frequently during week 3 of the NFL season.

== Music video ==
The music video for the song is merely clips of the band performing the song in concert.

== Charts ==
=== Weekly charts ===
Chart (2001–2002)	Peak position
US Mainstream Rock (Billboard)	10
US Pop Airplay (Billboard)	38

=== Year-end charts ===
Chart (2001)	Position
US Mainstream Rock Tracks (Billboard)	48

== Release history ==
Region	Date	Format(s)	Label(s)	Ref.
United States	April 17, 2001	Mainstream rock; active rock radio	Columbia	
United States	November 20, 2001	Contemporary hit radio	Columbia	
