= Girls of Summer =

2002 single by Aerosmith

Single by Aerosmith

from the album O, Yeah! Ultimate Aerosmith Hits
- Written: 2002
- Released: May 20, 2002
- Recorded: 2002
- Length: 3:13
- Label: Columbia
- Songwriters: Steven Tyler; Joe Perry; Marti Frederiksen
- Producers: Steven Tyler; Joe Perry; Marti Frederiksen

Aerosmith singles chronology
"Sunshine" (2001)	"Girls of Summer" (2002)	"Baby, Please Don't Go" (2003)

Music video
- "Girls Of Summer" on YouTube

"Girls of Summer" is a single by American hard rock band Aerosmith. Released in May 2002 as the only single from the band's 2002 greatest hits album, O, Yeah! Ultimate Aerosmith Hits, the song was written by lead singer Steven Tyler, guitarist Joe Perry, and professional songwriter Marti Frederiksen in Hawaii, following the end of the Just Push Play Tour.

"Girls of Summer" reached number 25 on the US Billboard Mainstream Rock Tracks chart. The song was nominated for a Grammy Award in 2003 in the category Best Rock Performance by a Duo or Group with Vocal. The Girls of Summer Tour, which occurred in the latter half of 2002 and featured Aerosmith with Kid Rock and Run-DMC as openers, was named after the single.

== Background ==
The song, described by the band's frequent collaborator Jack Douglas as "George Harrison meets the Beach Boys", reflected the laid-back atmosphere of its composition, which, according to Steven Tyler, he along with Perry and Fredericksen utilized Pro Tools and started flailing to see which vibe would come out. Another song from those sessions, "Bad Enough", was originally submitted for the Spider-Man soundtrack, but it was rejected and replaced with an Aerosmith cover of the "Spider-Man" theme song – before being rewritten into another track present in Oh Yeah!, "Lay It Down".

== Music video ==
The video for the song was directed by David Meyers, and filmed in South Miami Beach, Florida although the opening shot is of Ipanema, Brazil. The three women appearing in the video are Jaime Pressly, Nichole Galicia, and Kim Smith.

As Tyler is shown on the beach, the music video depicted the summer activities of the girls in different time points:

- '6:45: The Morning After' – Jaime takes a photo of a guy she sleeps with as he is still sleeping and leaves.
- '10:00 AM: The Kiss and Tell' – Jaime meets up with Kim and Nichole as they go over their photos.
- '1:45 PM: Retail Therapy' – The girls go into a swimwear store and try on bikinis. Kim seduces a desk clerk to make out with her until Jaime and Nichole get her out of there.
- '2:23 PM: The Mating Call' – When the girls cross the street and are complimented by some guys in a car, Jaime licks the Mercedes Benz symbol hood ornament on the hood of the car, then pulls it off and puts it in her purse as they walk away.
- '4:00 PM: The Beautification Hour' – The girls arrive at the beach in their string bikinis where Jaime and Nichole sunbathe while Kim relaxes in the surf. When a guy comes up to Jaime, she pulls down his swim trunks as he runs off.
- '5:00 PM: The Sand Off' – The girls wash the sand off of them at a beach shower as a boy watches them. The girls just smile at the boy.
- '6:10 PM: Breakin' the Law' – The girls ride motorscooters in a "No Motorized Vehicles Allowed" area.
- '7:43 PM: Soul Searching' – While Jaime relaxes in the bathtub and Nichole relaxes on the deck, Kim does some soul searching and leaves a message on her parents’ answering machine.
- '10:27 PM: The Wine 'n Dine' – At a restaurant, the girls have dinner and wine. When it comes to the bill being expensive, the girls run out.
- '3:14 AM: We Be Clubbing' – The girls dance at a beach club. While Nichole and Kim dance in the suds, a guy bumps into Jaime who ends up slapping him.

In the final scene, Tyler finds a sandwich on the beach. When he puts it in his mouth, he learns too late that it was a bait as Tyler is reeled into the ocean.

== Track listing ==
1. "Girls of Summer" (album version)
2. "Jaded" (album version)
3. "Walk This Way" (live '97)
4. "Girls of Summer" (video version)

== Charts ==
Weekly chart performance for "Girls of Summer"
Chart (2002)	Peak position
Canada Radio (Nielsen BDS)	59
Canada Rock (Nielsen BDS)	12
Poland (PiF PaF)	5
Italy (FIMI)	25
UK Rock & Metal (OCC)	23
US Mainstream Rock (Billboard)	25

== Release history ==
Release dates and formats for "Girls of Summer"
Region	Date	Format(s)	Label(s)	Ref.
United States	May 20, 2002	Mainstream rock; active rock radio	Columbia	
United States	May 28, 2002	Hot adult contemporary; contemporary hit radio	Columbia	
