= Zone Arena =

Coordinates: 44.467°N 26.109°E

Zone Arena is an arena located at 164 Barbu Văcărescu Boulevard in Bucharest, Romania. Opened on 1 May 2010, Zone Arena is used for events such as concerts, exhibitions, fairs and shows.

== Musical events ==
- 2010 Ozzy Osbourne, The Cranberries, Pink Martini, Faithless, Massive Attack, Gary Moore, Aerosmith, Reamonn, Bob Dylan, Goran Bregović, George Dalaras, etc.
- 2011 Scorpions, Roxette, etc.
- 2012 Julio Iglesias, Megadeth, Mötley Crüe, Motörhead, Dimmu Borgir, etc.
