= Marti Frederiksen =

American songwriter and musician (born 1962)

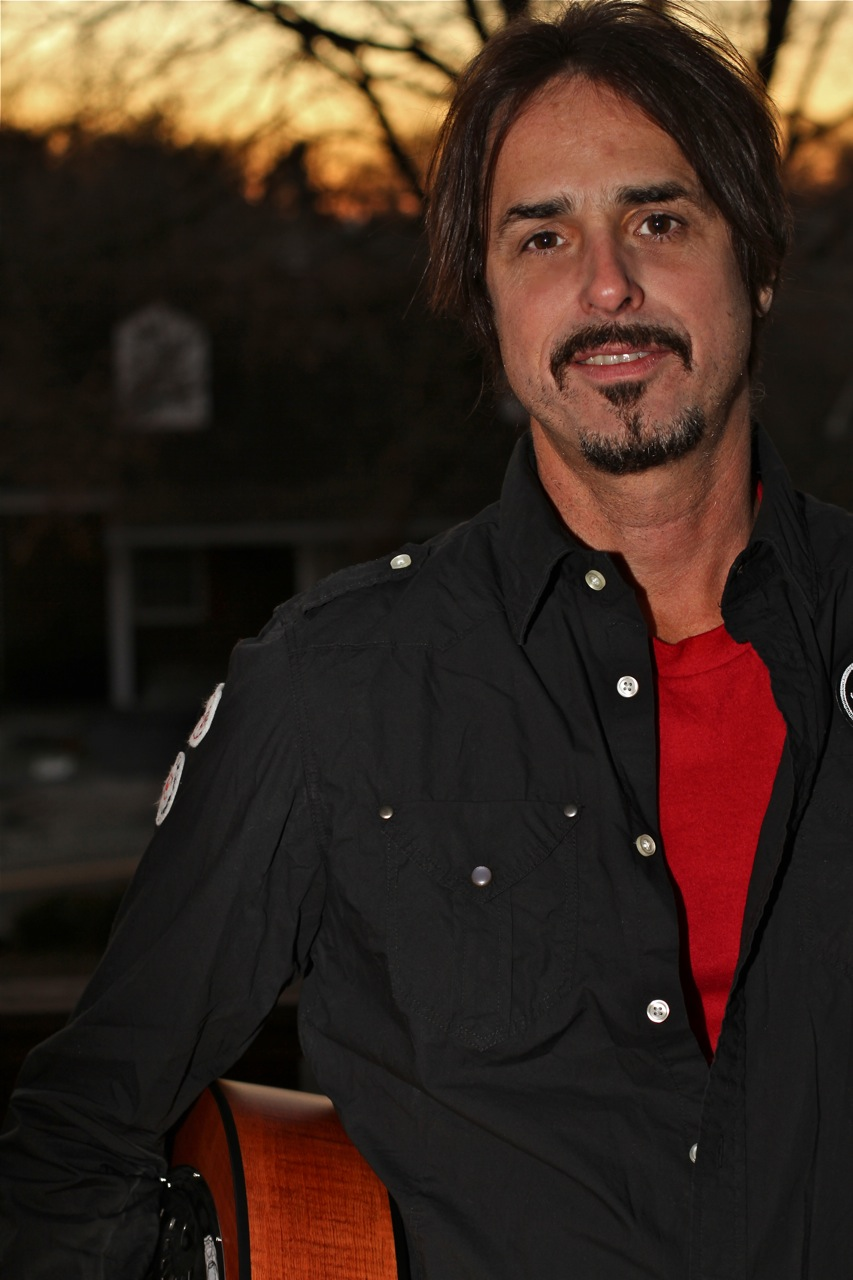
- Frederiksen in 2012

Background information
- Born: July 1, 1962 (age 64); Hawthorne, California, United States
- Origin: Los Angeles, California, United States
- Genres: Rock, pop, country, alternative rock
- Occupations: Songwriter, record producer, artist, music publisher
- Instruments: Vocals, drums, guitar, bass, keys, percussion
- Years active: 1983–present
- Labels: Virgin, Geffen, ATCO, Sony

Martin Harold "Marti" Frederiksen (born July 1, 1962) is an American songwriter, record producer, and musician. He writes and produces music primarily in rock, country, and pop. He is best known for his work with many artists and bands including the Struts, Aerosmith, Gavin Rossdale, Carrie Underwood, Buckcherry, Daughtry, Ozzy Osbourne, Mötley Crüe, and Faith Hill. He's also well known for performing the lead vocals for the fictitious band Stillwater in the movie Almost Famous.

== Biography ==
Songwriter, producer, engineer and drummer Marti Frederiksen been involved in numerous hits, performed by various artists, co-writing "Jaded" by Aerosmith, "Undo It" by Carrie Underwood, "Sorry" by Buckcherry, and "Love Remains the Same" by Gavin Rossdale.

Three of Frederiksen's LA-area bands landed record deals, and that led him to producing. Soon he was with Virgin Records co-writing and producing for the Southern rock-tinged Brother Cane, including two songs that reached No. 1 in the Billboard Mainstream Rock Charts.

== Career ==
=== With Aerosmith ===
Frederiksen has worked with Aerosmith since the mid-1990s.

Frederiksen has co-written several of Aerosmith's songs since the mid-1990s, including four of the songs on 1997's Nine Lives (including the single "Nine Lives"), ten of the songs on 2001's Just Push Play (including the singles "Jaded", "Fly Away from Here", and "Sunshine"), both of the new songs on 2002's O, Yeah! Ultimate Aerosmith Hits (including the single "Girls of Summer"), and the lone original track on the 2004 cover album Honkin' on Bobo ("The Grind").

Frederiksen received a Grammy Award nomination for the song "Jaded", which he co-wrote with Steven Tyler; the song was nominated for Best Rock Song at the 44th Annual Grammy Awards in 2002.

He also co-produced the Just Push Play album, and the bonus tracks on O, Yeah! Ultimate Aerosmith Hits.

Frederiksen produced and co-wrote "(It) Feels So Good" for Aerosmith lead singer Steven Tyler's solo project. The single reached No. 35 on the Billboard Hot 100. The song also features backing vocals from recording artist and The X Factor USA judge Nicole Scherzinger.

He also co-produced three tracks on Aerosmith's fifteenth studio album, Music from Another Dimension!, released in November 2012. He also co-wrote five tracks on that record. One co-produced and written song is a duet with Carrie Underwood titled "Can't Stop Lovin' You."

=== With other artists ===
Frederiksen has worked with numerous acts, co-writing and/or performing on albums such as the Almost Famous soundtrack (as the singer of the fictional band Stillwater), Def Leppard's X and co-wrote the song "I Should Have Told You" on Fuel's 2007 release Angels & Devils. He also co-wrote Buckcherry's hit single "Sorry" and co-wrote all 13 songs on Mötley Crüe's 2008 release Saints of Los Angeles. He has also written or co-written songs for Mick Jagger, Ozzy Osbourne, Brother Cane, Outlaw Blood, Motherland (which was the Jason Bonham Band with Marti replacing Daniel MacMaster), Jonny Lang, Deborah Bonham, Hannah Montana (as Miley Cyrus), Scorpions, Kenny Wayne Shepherd, the late Jeff Healey, Meat Loaf, Bo Bice, Richie Sambora, James Durbin, Jesse McCartney, Ace Frehley, Sheryl Crow, Cinder Road, Suzie McNeil, Default and Black Lab. He co-wrote Gavin Rossdale's hit single, "Love Remains the Same" *(for which he won a 2010 BMI Pop Award in the US and London.) He produced and co-wrote all songs on Foreigner's 2009 release, Can't Slow Down. Marti wrote and produced Vince Neil's single and title track of his album, Tattoos and Tequila. Frederiksen also co-wrote the song "Walk Away" from Black Veil Brides' fourth album.

In 2010, two singles he co-wrote were released by Carrie Underwood on her Play On album, "Undo It" (#1 on Country) and "Mama's Song." Both songs were written with Carrie Underwood, Kara DioGuardi, and Luke Laird. He co-wrote two songs on Daughtry's album Break the Spell, including the single "Crawling Back to You".

Frederiksen provided the lead singing vocals for Jason Lee on the movie Almost Famous.

Frederiksen is also an accomplished recording producer, mixer, and engineer. He mixed Aerosmith's and Metallica's Guitar Hero Editions. He also produced Faith Hill's hit song "Cry," for which she won a "Best Vocal Performance" Grammy. In 2010 he produced a tribute album featuring Western artists, Siam Shade Tribute, for Japanese rock band Siam Shade.

In 2014, he formed the band Loving Mary with Rebecca Lynn Howard, Suzie McNeil and Elisha Hoffman.

Frederiksen continued working as a songwriter, musician and producer, contributing songwriting and production work to recordings by artists including Daughtry, Buckcherry, The Struts, DOROTHY and Foreigner.

In 2025, Frederiksen produced the seventh studio album of Australian country-rock artist Jayne Denham recorded across three sessions in Nashville, Tennessee. Singles released throughout 2026 include "Hillbilly Halo", "Preacher's Son", and "Angel of Mercy", ahead of a scheduled January 2027 release.

=== Awards and nominations ===
BMI Pop Awards- Aerosmith – "Jaded" Bo Bice – "The Real Thing" Gavin Rossdale – "Love Remains the Same" Buckcherry – "Sorry" Sick Puppies – "Maybe"

BMI London Pop Award- Gavin Rossdale – "Love Remains the Same"

BMI Country Awards: Carrie Underwood – "Undo It" Carrie Underwood – "Mama's Song"

Ivor Novello: "The Flame Still Burns" in the movie, Still Crazy
