= You See Me Crying =

1975 single by Aerosmith

Single by Aerosmith

from the album Toys in the Attic
- B-side: "Toys in the Attic"
- Released: November 11, 1975
- Recorded: 1975
- Genre: Soft rock
- Length: 3:00 (single version); 5:12 (album version)
- Label: Columbia
- Songwriters: Steven Tyler, Don Solomon
- Producer: Jack Douglas

Aerosmith singles chronology
"Walk This Way" (1975)	"You See Me Crying" (1975)	"Dream On (re-release)" (1976)

"You See Me Crying" is a power ballad by American hard rock band Aerosmith. It was released in 1975 as the last track on the band's breakthrough album Toys in the Attic. A shorter mix of the song was released as the third single from the album in November 1975, but failed to chart. Consequently, the original single (backed with "Toys in the Attic") is rather rare.

== Recording ==
The song is a complex piano ballad and was heavily orchestrated. Aerosmith and producer Jack Douglas brought in a symphony orchestra for the song, which was conducted by Mike Mainieri. The song itself was written by lead singer Steven Tyler and outside collaborator Don Solomon (keyboardist on Tyler's first band, Chain Reaction). Some of the band members became frustrated with the song, which took a long time to complete, due to the many complex drum and guitar parts. Due to the complex arrangement featuring piano and orchestra, Aerosmith rarely plays the song live.

The band's label, Columbia Records, was nonetheless very impressed with the song and the recording process. Bruce Lundvall, then-president of Columbia, walked in on the recording sessions for Toys when the band was working on the song and remarked: "You guys got an incredible thing going here. I just came from a Herbie Hancock session and this is much more fun".

Brad Whitford played lead guitar on the song, rather than Aerosmith's usual lead guitarist Joe Perry.

== Reception ==
Cash Box called it a "a rock ballad sure to raise nodules on your turntable" and that "heavy metal enthusiasts will appreciate the large-scale production as Aerosmith sounds like five major symphony orchestras all playing different songs." Ultimate Classic Rock critic Chad Childers rated it as Aerosmith's 10th best song of the 1970s, saying that Tyler shows "a knack for rock ballads that would serve him well in the decades to come."

== Performance notes ==
The final version of the song was taken from takes 12, 14, and 15, and the single version of the song was edited down to 3:00.

While Aerosmith were planning the Back in the Saddle Tour and recording the Done with Mirrors album during 1984, Boston DJ Mark Parenteau of WBCN-FM played the song. Tyler liked the song so much, he suggested his group record a cover version, only to be told by Perry, "It's us, fuckhead." Tyler was suffering from memory problems at the time due to heavy drug use.
