= Fly Away from Here =

2001 single by Aerosmith

Single by Aerosmith

from the album Just Push Play
- Released: April 30, 2001
- Length: 5:01
- Label: Columbia
- Songwriters: Marti Frederiksen; Todd Chapman
- Producers: Steven Tyler; Joe Perry; Marti Frederiksen; Mark Hudson

Aerosmith singles chronology
"Just Push Play" (2001)	"Fly Away from Here" (2001)	"Sunshine" (2001)

Music video
- "Fly Away from Here" on YouTube

"Fly Away from Here" is a song by American rock band Aerosmith. It was the third single released from their 13th studio album, Just Push Play. The song was written by songwriters Marti Frederiksen and Todd Chapman. It failed to make a significant impact commercially but did receive some airplay on US pop radio.

== Music video ==
The video for the song, directed by Joseph Kahn, features the band performing on a rooftop in a futuristic cityscape. The video also stars the actress Jessica Biel, and Steven Tyler's youngest daughter, Chelsea, portraying Steven as a child in this video.

== Track listing ==
1. "Fly Away from Here" (radio remix edit)
2. "Fly Away from Here" (album version)
3. "Fly Away from Here" (rock remix edit)
4. "I Don't Want to Miss a Thing" (Armageddon version)

== Personnel ==
Aerosmith

- Steven Tyler – lead vocals
- Tom Hamilton – bass
- Joey Kramer – drums
- Joe Perry – lead guitar, backing vocals
- Brad Whitford – rhythm guitar

Additional personnel

- Jim Cox – piano
- Paul Santo – Kurzweil

== Charts ==
Weekly chart performance for "Fly Away from Here"
Chart (2001)	Peak position
Australia (ARIA)	161
Italy (FIMI)	40
Netherlands (Dutch Tipparade 40)	24
Netherlands (Single Top 100)	99
Switzerland (Schweizer Hitparade)	94
US Bubbling Under Hot 100 (Billboard)	3
US Adult Pop Airplay (Billboard)	36
US Pop Airplay (Billboard)	24

== Release history ==
Release dates and formats for "Fly Away from Here"
Region	Date	Format(s)	Label(s)	Ref.
United States	April 30, 2001	Adult contemporary; hot adult contemporary radio	Columbia	
United States	May 1, 2001	Contemporary hit radio	Columbia	
Japan	June 6, 2001	CD	Sony Int'l	
Australia	July 23, 2001	CD	Columbia	
