= Toys in the Attic (song) =

Single by Aerosmith

from the album Toys in the Attic
- A-side: "You See Me Crying"
- Released: November 11, 1975
- Studio: Record Plant (New York City)
- Genre: Hard rock; heavy metal; proto-punk
- Length: 3:05
- Label: Columbia
- Songwriters: Steven Tyler; Joe Perry
- Producer: Jack Douglas

Aerosmith singles chronology
"You See Me Crying" (1975)	"Toys in the Attic" (1975)	"Last Child" (1976)

"Toys in the Attic" is a song by American rock band Aerosmith. Written by Steven Tyler and Joe Perry, it is the first song and title track from the band's third album Toys in the Attic, their bestselling studio album in the United States. It was released as the B-side to the "You See Me Crying" single in 1975.

== Reception ==
Ultimate Classic Rock critic Michael Gallucci rated Perry's guitar riff in the song as Aerosmith's 10th greatest, and also said that Perry's "fierce solo sounds gutsier and angrier than usual."

== Achievements ==
The song "Toys in the Attic" is part of The Rock and Roll Hall of Fame's 500 Songs that Shaped Rock and Roll list.

== Other versions ==
The song is also featured on two of the band's live albums, Live! Bootleg (1978) and Classics Live II (1987). It is also found as a bonus track on some pressings of the career-spanning collection O, Yeah! Ultimate Aerosmith Hits (2002).

== Cover versions ==
R.E.M. recorded a version of the song in 1986 as a B-side to their single "Fall on Me". This can be found on Dead Letter Office, with guitarist Peter Buck saying that the song "...was always fun to play live."

It has also been covered by The Answer, Black Happy, Metal Church, Warrant, Ratt and Roadsaw.

Stephen Pearcy, Tracii Guns, Phil Soussan and Aynsley Dunbar performed it for the Aerosmith tribute album Not the Same Old Song and Dance (Eagle Records, 1999). Backing vocals were by David Glen Eisley. This version resurfaced on a set entitled Guns Box: Attitude for Destruction.
