= Honkin' on Bobo =

Studio album by Aerosmith
- Released: March 30, 2004
- Recorded: 2003
- Studios: The Boneyard; The Bryer Patch; Pandora's Box
- Genres: Hard rock; blues rock
- Length: 43:57
- Label: Columbia
- Producers: Steven Tyler; Joe Perry; Jack Douglas; Marti Frederiksen

Aerosmith chronology
Just Push Play (2001)	Honkin' on Bobo (2004)	Music from Another Dimension! (2012)

Singles from Honkin' on Bobo
- 1. "Baby, Please Don't Go" Released: 2004

Honkin' on Bobo is the fourteenth studio album by American rock band Aerosmith, released on March 30, 2004, by Columbia Records. The album includes 11 covers of blues and blues rock songs from the 1940s, 1950s and 1960s, with one new song, "The Grind". The album pays tribute to Aerosmith's earliest influences and showcases a rawer sound when compared to their more recent commercial efforts. Honkin' on Bobo was produced by Jack Douglas, who was Aerosmith's producer on a vast majority of their 1970s output.

The album sold over 160,000 copies in its first week, reaching number five on the Billboard 200. Honkin' on Bobo was certified gold by the Recording Industry Association of America on May 11, 2004.

== Background ==
After their departure from Geffen Records in 1994, the band wanted their next record to be a blues album. "Then," said singer Steven Tyler, "we caught wind that Clapton was doing it, and we went, 'Fuck!'… We did such incredible research for this album, too… We also thought about our roots, about paying homage to the stuff we loved: early Yardbirds and all. Some of Little Walter's early stuff. Really obscure names… I did some digging around myself in Chicago. We had some great songs to work with—and then Clapton came along and did it."

Honkin' on Bobo was recorded in Joe Perry's ranch near Boston, with the band committing to playing only when they were in a good mood. "We wanted to do something we haven't done before and that excites us," Perry said. "That's what makes us want to do another record. Otherwise, we'd say, 'OK, we've done everything we can do, so why bother even going in again?’"

The album title was suggested by Tyler, who had heard the phrase before, possibly from the song by Canadian country/bluegrass band The Good Brothers, and amused the band with it. Perry stated during a radio interview, "We just know that it's a phrase that sounds ... jazzish, nastyish, so it works for us."

Many tracks feature harmonica by Tyler, including Little Walter's "Temperature". This was played on an episode of the House of Blues Radio Hour that was about the harmonica. A harmonica keychain was included with the limited-edition version. Provisional artwork featured the cover's harmonica stuffed into a model's denim cutoffs. This was vetoed, said its proponent Tyler, "because I'm in a band with four other guys."

"Stop Messin' Around" – a Fleetwood Mac cover, sung by Perry—had never before appeared on an Aerosmith album, despite being a staple of the band's concerts for more than ten years.

== Reception ==
Professional ratings
Aggregate scores
Source	Rating
Metacritic	69/100
Review scores
Source	Rating
AllMusic	3.5/5 stars
Blender	3/5 stars
E!	B−
Entertainment Weekly	B−
The Guardian	2/5 stars
Mojo	4/5 stars
Q	3.5/5 stars
Rolling Stone	4/5 stars
USA Today	3/4 stars

According to the review aggregator Metacritic, Honkin' on Bobo received "generally favorable reviews" based on a weighted average score of 69 out of 100 from 12 critic scores. Stephen Thomas Erlewine of AllMusic said that the album is the best the band has done since Pump in 1989, and that it cannot be called a "blues" album because it is a rock album. He called the album a "surprise" in that, even though the album's artwork and title are bad, it marks a return to Aerosmith. In his Blender magazine review of the album, Jon Pareles said that the band did their blues album differently from most others because, instead of making "respectable" cover versions, they make quite unrespectable cover versions like "You Gotta Move". The album, to him, proves that Aerosmith can still rock. Chris Willman of Entertainment Weekly felt that the album didn't live up to what it should be because it is too loud, but some songs on the album are good.

David Fricke of Rolling Stone compared and contrasted Aerosmith's Honkin' on Bobo and Eric Clapton's Me and Mr. Johnson which also explored blues influences. He felt that Clapton's album was mostly about pain, while Aerosmith's album was about sex and running away from lovers. He considers Bobo to be a double-tribute album—one tribute to the original musicians and one tribute for 1960s blues-rock bands – and considers the album to be overdone, which is what Aerosmith is good at.

== Track listing ==
Honkin' on Bobo track listing
No.	Title	Writer(s)	Length
1.	"Road Runner" (Bo Diddley cover)	Ellas McDaniel a.k.a. Bo Diddley	3:46
2.	"Shame, Shame, Shame" (Billy Williams cover)	Ruby Fisher, Kenyon Hopkins	2:15
3.	"Eyesight to the Blind" (Sonny Boy Williamson II cover)	Sonny Boy Williamson II	3:09
4.	"Baby, Please Don't Go" (Joe Williams cover)	Joe Williams	3:24
5.	"Never Loved a Girl" (Aretha Franklin cover)	Ronny Shannon	3:12
6.	"Back Back Train" (Mississippi Fred McDowell cover)	Fred McDowell	4:23
7.	"You Gotta Move" (Mississippi Fred McDowell cover)	Rev. Gary Davis, Fred McDowell	5:30
8.	"The Grind"	Steven Tyler, Joe Perry, Marti Frederiksen	3:46
9.	"I'm Ready" (Muddy Waters cover)	Willie Dixon	4:13
10.	"Temperature" (Little Walter cover)	Joel Michael Cohen, Walter Jacobs	2:52
11.	"Stop Messin' Around" (Fleetwood Mac cover)	Clifford Adams, Peter Green	4:29
12.	"Jesus Is on the Main Line" (Mississippi Fred McDowell cover)	(Traditional, arr. by F. McDowell)	2:51

Japanese edition
No.	Title	Writer(s)	Length
13.	"Jaded"	Tyler, Marti Frederiksen	3:34

== Personnel ==
- Steven Tyler – lead vocals, harmonica, piano on "Never Loved a Girl", backing vocals on "Stop Messin' Around", percussion, production
- Joe Perry – lead guitar, backing vocals, lead vocals on "Back Back Train" and "Stop Messin' Around", production
- Brad Whitford – rhythm and lead guitar
- Tom Hamilton – bass guitar
- Joey Kramer – drums, percussion

Additional musicians

- Tracy Bonham – vocals on "Back Back Train" and "Jesus Is on the Main Line"
- Johnnie Johnson – piano on "Shame, Shame, Shame" and "Temperature"
- The Memphis Horns – brass on "Never Loved a Girl"
- Paul Santo – piano, electric piano, organ, engineering

Production

- Jack Douglas – production
- Paul Caruso – engineering
- Jay Messina – engineering
- Bob Ludwig – mastering
- Marti Frederiksen – production, mixing, engineering

== Charts ==
=== Weekly charts ===
Weekly chart performance for Honkin' on Bobo
Chart (2004)	Peak position
Australian Albums (ARIA)	59
Austrian Albums (Ö3 Austria)	22
Belgian Albums (Ultratop Wallonia)	44
Canadian Albums (Billboard)	5
Dutch Albums (Album Top 100)	64
Finnish Albums (Suomen virallinen lista)	35
French Albums (SNEP)	52
German Albums (Offizielle Top 100)	32
Irish Albums (IRMA)	60
Italian Albums (FIMI)	21
Japanese Albums (Oricon)	6
Scottish Albums (Official Charts)	21
Spanish Albums (AFYVE)	48
Swedish Albums (Sverigetopplistan)	38
Swiss Albums (Schweizer Hitparade)	17
UK Albums (Official Charts)	28
UK Rock & Metal Albums (Official Charts)	3
US Billboard 200	5
US Top Blues Albums (Billboard)	1

=== Year-end charts ===
2004 year-end chart performance for Honkin' on Bobo
Chart (2004)	Position
US Billboard 200	151

== Sales and certifications ==
Certifications and sales for Honkin' on Bobo
Region	Certification	Certified units/sales
Japan (RIAJ)	Gold	100,000^{^}
South Korea	—	2,162
United States (RIAA)	Gold	500,000^{^}
^{^} Shipments figures based on certification alone.

== Sources ==
- Furniss, Matters (2012). Aerosmith: Uncensored on the Record. Warwickshire, UK: Coda Books. ISBN 978-1781580141.
