= Just Push Play =

Studio album by Aerosmith
- Released: March 5, 2001
- Recorded: April–December 2000
- Studios: The Boneyard & The Bryer Patch; Long View Farms Studio, North Brookfield, Massachusetts; Ocean Way Studios (Los Angeles); Sound Techniques (Los Angeles); The Village Recorder (Los Angeles); The Studio in the Sunset Marquis (West Hollywood, California); Pearl White Studios; Whatinthewhatthe? Studios
- Genres: Hard rock; pop metal
- Length: 50:50 (US); 53:34 (International)
- Label: Columbia
- Producers: Steven Tyler; Joe Perry; Mark Hudson; Marti Frederiksen

Aerosmith chronology
Nine Lives (1997)	Just Push Play (2001)	Honkin' on Bobo (2004)

Singles from Just Push Play
- 1. "Jaded" Released: January 16, 2001; 2. "Just Push Play" Released: April 17, 2001; 3. "Fly Away from Here" Released: April 30, 2001; 4. "Sunshine" Released: October 9, 2001

Just Push Play is the thirteenth studio album by American rock band Aerosmith, co-produced by song collaborators Marti Frederiksen and Mark Hudson and was released on March 5, 2001. Just Push Play debuted at No. 2 within the Billboard 200, selling over 240,000 copies in its first week, and was certified Platinum by the Recording Industry Association of America within a month of its release.

The album's first single, "Jaded", became a Top 10 hit in the US and around the world. Subsequent singles "Fly Away from Here", "Sunshine", and "Just Push Play", though garnering some airplay, failed to impact the Hot 100, although the latter two reached the US Mainstream Rock chart and the former appeared within the Adult Top 40.

== Background ==
The album's cover, which was designed by Hajime Sorayama, features a gynoid resembling Marilyn Monroe. The illustration had already been used for the cover of a compilation album of various artists hits called Video Sound, released in 1985, and which did not include any Aerosmith songs.

Several songs were recorded for the album that went unused. "Ain't It True", "Easy", "Innocent Man", "I Love You Down", "We Love To Say This", "Sweet Due" and "Zorro" can be linked as originating from these sessions. "Angel's Eye" was used for the soundtrack to the 2000 film Charlie's Angels. "Face" and "Won't Let You Down" were issued as bonus tracks on later pressings of the album. The track "Do You Wonder" was supposedly recorded for this album, as well.

In 2010, guitarist Joe Perry criticized the album:

I don't think we've made a decent album in years. Just Push Play is my least favorite. When we recorded it there was never a point where all five members were in the room at the same time and Aerosmith's major strength is playing together. It was a learning experience for me: it showed me how not to make an Aerosmith record.

== Critical reception ==
Professional ratings
Aggregate scores
Source	Rating
Metacritic	65/100
Review scores
Source	Rating
AllMusic	3/5 stars
Blender	2/5 stars
Christgau’s Consumer Guide	(choice cut)
Dotmusic	3/5 stars
Drowned in Sound	4/10
Entertainment Weekly	B
The Guardian	3/5 stars
NME	6/10
Q	3/5 stars
Rolling Stone	3.5/5 stars

According to the review aggregator Metacritic, Just Push Play received "generally favorable reviews" based on a weighted average score of 65 out of 100 from 14 critic scores.

For his review of Just Push Play for AllMusic, Stephen Thomas Erlewine said that it was their best-sounding album in the past decade, as well as "tighter, savvier, and better" than anything since their 1989 album Pump, but it was not much compared to Pump and its 1987 predecessor, Permanent Vacation. He felt it lacked anything memorable, and the band's "refusal to act their age results in a couple of embarrassing slips into stodginess".

Darryl Stredan strongly disliked the album, to the point that he considered it proof that Aerosmith should stop making new music. Chris Willman of Entertainment Weekly called the album "good but not great". NME said that while most of the album is not new, it was their first to feature rap metal with songs like "Just Push Play" and "Outta Your Head".

David Fricke of Rolling Stone said that Just Push Play was the closest Aerosmith had come to a "great album" since 1976's Rocks, despite the "weak spots" of the album's power ballads. Robert Christgau picked out the album's lead single, "Jaded", as a choice cut.

The album was nominated for three Grammy Awards in 2001, including Best Rock Album (Just Push Play), Best Rock Performance by a Duo or Group ("Jaded"), and Best Short Form Music Video ("Fly Away from Here").

== Track listing ==
Just Push Play track listing
No.	Title	Writer(s)	Length
1.	"Beyond Beautiful"	Steven Tyler; Joe Perry; Marti Frederiksen	4:45
2.	"Just Push Play"	Tyler; Mark Hudson; Steve Dudas	3:51
3.	"Jaded"	Tyler; Frederiksen	3:34
4.	"Fly Away from Here"	Frederiksen; Todd Chapman	5:01
5.	"Trip Hoppin'"	Tyler; Perry; Frederiksen; Hudson	4:27
6.	"Sunshine"	Tyler; Perry; Frederiksen	3:37
7.	"Under My Skin"	Tyler; Perry; Frederiksen; Hudson	3:45
8.	"Luv Lies"	Tyler; Perry; Frederiksen; Hudson	4:26
9.	"Outta Your Head"	Tyler; Perry; Frederiksen	3:22
10.	"Drop Dead Gorgeous"	Tyler; Perry; Hudson	3:42
11.	"Light Inside"	Tyler; Perry; Frederiksen	3:34
12.	"Avant Garden"	Tyler; Perry; Frederiksen; Hudson	6:36
Total length:			50:50

International version
No.	Title	Writer(s)	Length
13.	"Face"/"Under My Skin" (reprise; starts at 3:38)	Tyler; Perry; Frederiksen	4:38
14.	"Jaded" (video)	Tyler; Frederiksen	3:47
Total length:			53:34

Japanese version
No.	Title	Writer(s)	Length
13.	"Won't Let You Down"	Tyler; Perry; Frederiksen	3:38
14.	"I Don't Want to Miss a Thing"	Diane Warren	4:58
Total length:			57:35

Japanese limited edition – disc two
No.	Title	Writer(s)	Length
1.	"Just Push Play" (radio remix)	Tyler; Hudson; Dudas	3:16
2.	"Same Old Song and Dance" (live from California Jam II, 1978)	Tyler; Perry	5:13
3.	"Draw the Line" (live from California Jam II, 1978)	Tyler; Perry	4:32
4.	"Chip Away the Stone" (live from California Jam II, 1978)	Richard Supa	4:24
5.	"Big Ten Inch Record" (live from Texxas Jam, 1978)	Fred Weismantel	3:58
6.	"Lord of the Thighs" (live from Texxas Jam, 1978)	Tyler	7:13

NB: On the original version, roughly 45 seconds after "Avant Garden" a hidden track entitled "Under My Skin Reprise" plays for about one minute. On the international version, the track is roughly 40 seconds after "Face" and on the Japanese version after "I Don't Want to Miss a Thing".

== Personnel ==
Aerosmith

- Steven Tyler – lead vocals, backing vocals, piano, squeezebox, harmonica, percussion, additional guitar and drums on "Just Push Play", conga, mixing, production
- Joe Perry – guitar, slide guitar, pedal steel guitar, hurdy-gurdy, backing vocals, lead vocals on "Drop Dead Gorgeous", mixing, production
- Brad Whitford – guitar
- Tom Hamilton – bass guitar, fretless bass
- Joey Kramer – drums

Additional musicians

- Jim Cox – piano on "Fly Away From Here"
- Paul Santo – keyboards Kurzweil on "Fly Away from Here", Hammond organ on "Avant Garden", engineering at the Bryer Patch
- Tower of Power – horns on "Trip Hoppin'"
- Dan Higgins – clarinet, saxophone on "Trip Hoppin'"
- Chelsea Tyler – backing vocals on "Under My Skin"
- Paul Caruso – loop programming on "Drop Dead Gorgeous", engineering at the Boneyard
- Liv Tyler – whispers on "Avant Garden"
- Tony Perry – scratching on "Just Push Play"

Production

- Marti Frederiksen – production, mixing, recording
- Mark Hudson – production, mixing
- Mike Shipley – mixing
- Richard Chycki – recording
- Bryan Carrigan – additional engineering
- David Campbell – strings arrangements, except on "Sunshine", "Luv Lies", and "Avant Garden"
- Jim Cox – string arrangements on "Sunshine", "Luv Lies", and "Avant Garden", horns arrangements
- Alan Sides – engineering on strings
- Scott Gordon – engineering on horns and strings
- George Marino – mastering
- John Kalodner – John Kalodner
- Lesie Langlo – artist and repertoire coordination
- Kevin Reagan – art direction, design
- Matthew Lindauer – design
- Mark Seliger – photography
- Hajime Sorayama – illustrations

== Studios ==
Aerosmith recorded Just Push Play from April to December 2000 at:

- The Boneyard & The Bryer Patch
- Long View Farms Studio, North Brookfield, Massachusetts
- Ocean Way Studios, Los Angeles
- Sound Techniques
- Village Recorders, Los Angeles
- Pearl White Studios
- Whatinthewhatthe? Studios
- The Studio in the Sunset Marquis, West Hollywood, California

== Charts ==
=== Weekly charts ===
Chart (2001)	Peak position
Australian Albums (ARIA)	27
Austrian Albums (Ö3 Austria)	7
Belgian Albums (Ultratop Flanders)	35
Belgian Albums (Ultratop Wallonia)	27
Canadian Albums (Billboard)	2
Danish Albums (Hitlisten)	19
Dutch Albums (Album Top 100)	32
Finnish Albums (Suomen virallinen lista)	8
French Albums (SNEP)	32
German Albums (Offizielle Top 100)	6
Hungarian Albums (MAHASZ)	12
Irish Albums (IRMA)	55
Italian Albums (FIMI)	8
Japanese Albums (Oricon)	4
Norwegian Albums (VG-lista)	24
Polish Albums (ZPAV)	24
Scottish Albums (Official Charts)	7
Spanish Albums (AFYVE)	20
Swedish Albums (Sverigetopplistan)	19
Swiss Albums (Schweizer Hitparade)	3
UK Albums (Official Charts)	7
UK Rock & Metal Albums (Official Charts)	1
US Billboard 200	2

=== Year-end charts ===
Chart (2001)	Position
Canadian Albums (Nielsen SoundScan)	101
Swiss Albums (Schweizer Hitparade)	68
US Billboard 200	89
Worldwide Albums (IFPI)	33

== Sales and certifications ==
Region	Certification	Certified units/sales
Argentina (CAPIF)	Gold	20,000^{^}
Brazil (Pro-Música Brasil)	Gold	50,000^{*}
Japan (RIAJ)	2× Platinum	400,000^{^}
South Korea	—	10,298
Switzerland (IFPI Switzerland)	Gold	20,000^{^}
United Kingdom (BPI)	Silver	60,000^{^}
United States (RIAA)	Platinum	1,000,000^{^}
^{*} Sales figures based on certification alone.^{^} Shipments figures based on certification alone.

== Sources ==
- Furniss, Matters (2012). Aerosmith: Uncensored on the Record. Warwickshire, UK: Coda Books. ISBN 978-1781580141.
