= Jaded (Aerosmith song) =

2001 single by Aerosmith

Single by Aerosmith

from the album Just Push Play
- B-side: "Angel's Eye"
- Released: January 16, 2001
- Genre: Pop rock; pop metal; alternative rock; power pop
- Length: 3:34
- Label: Columbia
- Songwriters: Steven Tyler; Marti Frederiksen
- Producers: Steven Tyler; Joe Perry; Marti Frederiksen; Mark Hudson

Aerosmith singles chronology
"Angel's Eye" (2000)	"Jaded" (2001)	"Just Push Play" (2001)

Audio sample
- file; help

Music video
- "Jaded" on YouTube

"Jaded" is a song by the American rock band Aerosmith. It was written by lead singer Steven Tyler and songwriting collaborator Marti Frederiksen. Serviced to US radio on January 16, 2001, it served as the first single from the band's 13th studio album, Just Push Play (2001). The song was debuted publicly at the 2001 American Music Awards and was also played at the halftime show for Super Bowl XXXV in January 2001. It was ranked No. 86 on VH1's "100 Greatest Songs of the '00s".

Commercially, "Jaded" reached number one on both the US Billboard Mainstream Rock Tracks chart and the UK Rock Chart, whilst reaching number seven on the Billboard Hot 100 and number six in Canada. On the UK Singles Chart, the song peaked at number 13 and became the band's eighth top-20 single on that chart; it remains their last UK top-40 hit as of 2026. Additionally, "Jaded" reached the top 20 in Italy, the Netherlands and Spain. The song would become Aerosmith's final chart hit in most territories.

Aerosmith were inducted into the Rock and Roll Hall of Fame in March 2001, when "Jaded" was still climbing the Billboard Hot 100. Aerosmith are the only band to have been inducted into the Hall of Fame whilst having a single active on the charts. In 2002, "Jaded" was nominated for a Grammy Award for Best Rock Performance by a Duo or Group with Vocal at the 44th Annual Grammy Awards.

== Lyrics and music ==
Steven Tyler was inspired to write "Jaded" based on missing much of his daughter Liv Tyler's childhood while being on the road with his band. The song's lyrics are about a girl who is "jaded", and how the relationship the narrator has with the girl is sometimes "complicated", but asserts that "I'm the one that jaded you." Tyler stated that "When I hit on the melody for 'Jaded,' it was so phenomenal that for a while I was scared to do anything more with it. I didn't even tell the band."

Alex Hopper of American Songwriter described the song as "the moment Aerosmith fully sank into their new pop-metal sound." Critics have also described "Jaded" as pop rock, alternative rock, and power pop.

== Music video ==
The video for "Jaded" features Aerosmith performing in the lobby of the Los Angeles Theater, and clips of a "jaded" girl (actress Mila Kunis). The song tells a story of a girl who has lost the ability to feel due to losing touch with reality.

The Los Angeles Theater is a movie palace in downtown Los Angeles and is extravagantly designed in the French Rococo style. The video also features the ballroom/lounge, the landing on the way to the ballroom, auditorium, and the mezzanine hallway. The hallway shot uses either a mirror, or special effects, to multiply the doors and make the hallway seem endless.

There are two versions of the video, much of the footage is the same, though used in slightly different places, and some shots have alternate angles. In the first version, the opening shot features a quick zoom on the stage, Steven Tyler blows into the camera, and he is shown when the music starts in the forest interlude. In the second version, the opening shot features a slow zoom on the stage, a horse statue blows into the camera, and Tyler is not shown when the music starts in the forest interlude.

The video premiered on MTV on February 13, 2001, and was directed by Francis Lawrence. The video was awarded Best Hard Rock Clip of the Year at the Billboard Music Video Awards, and Video of the Year at the Boston Music Awards.

== Track listings ==
All tracks are written by Steven Tyler and Marti Frederiksen except where noted.

US maxi-CD single
No.	Title	Writer(s)	Length
1.	"Jaded" (album version)		3:34
2.	"Jaded" (acoustic mix)		3:34
3.	"Angel's Eye"		3:21
4.	"Jaded" (Guitars mix)		3:34
5.	"Under My Skin" (reprise)	Tyler, Joe Perry, Frederiksen, Mark Hudson	1:00

US and UK 7-inch single
No.	Title	Length
1.	"Jaded" (album version)	3:34
2.	"Angel's Eye"	3:22

UK CD single
No.	Title	Writer(s)	Length
1.	"Jaded" (album version)		3:34
2.	"Won't Let You Down"	Tyler, Perry, Frederiksen, Hudson	3:36
3.	"I Don't Want to Miss a Thing"	Diane Warren	4:59

UK cassette single
No.	Title	Writer(s)	Length
1.	"Jaded" (album version)		3:34
2.	"I Don't Want to Miss a Thing"	Warren	4:59

European CD1
No.	Title	Writer(s)	Length
1.	"Jaded"		3:34
2.	"Won't Let You Down"	Tyler, Perry, Frederiksen, Hudson	3:37

European CD2
No.	Title	Writer(s)	Length
1.	"Jaded"		3:34
2.	"Won't Let You Down"	Tyler, Perry, Frederiksen, Hudson	3:37
3.	"Angel's Eye"		3:22
4.	"I Don't Want to Miss a Thing"	Warren	4:59

Australian CD single
No.	Title	Writer(s)	Length
1.	"Jaded" (album version)		3:34
2.	"Jaded" (acoustic mix)		3:34
3.	"Angel's Eye"		3:21
4.	"Under My Skin" (reprise)	Tyler, Perry, Frederiksen, Hudson	1:00

== Charts ==
=== Weekly charts ===
Weekly chart performance for "Jaded"
Chart (2001)	Peak position
Australia (ARIA)	51
Austria (Ö3 Austria Top 40)	47
Canada (Nielsen SoundScan)	6
Canada CHR (Nielsen BDS)	1
Europe (Eurochart Hot 100)	31
Germany (GfK)	48
Ireland (IRMA)	42
Italy (FIMI)	11
Netherlands (Dutch Top 40)	17
Netherlands (Single Top 100)	54
New Zealand (Recorded Music NZ)	41
Scotland Singles (OCC)	9
Spain (Promusicae)	18
Sweden (Sverigetopplistan)	42
Switzerland (Schweizer Hitparade)	30
UK Singles (OCC)	13
UK Rock & Metal (OCC)	1
US Billboard Hot 100	7
US Adult Pop Airplay (Billboard)	6
US Mainstream Rock (Billboard)	1
US Pop Airplay (Billboard)	6

=== Year-end charts ===
Year-end chart performance for "Jaded"
Chart (2001)	Position
Brazil (Crowley)	50
Canada (Nielsen SoundScan)	56
Canada Radio (Nielsen BDS)	10
US Billboard Hot 100	47
US Adult Top 40 (Billboard)	23
US Mainstream Rock Tracks (Billboard)	15
US Mainstream Top 40 (Billboard)	31

== Certifications ==
Certifications and sales for "Jaded"
Region	Certification	Certified units/sales
United States (RIAA)	Gold	500,000^{‡}
^{‡} Sales+streaming figures based on certification alone.

== Release history ==
Release dates and formats for "Jaded"
Region	Date	Format(s)	Label(s)	Ref(s).
United States	December 21, 2000	Promotional	Columbia	
United States	January 16, 2001	Contemporary hit; hot AC; mainstream rock; active rock radio	Columbia	
United States	February 20, 2001	7-inch vinyl; CD	Columbia	
Australia	February 26, 2001	CD	Columbia	
Japan	February 28, 2001	CD	SME	
United Kingdom	March 5, 2001	7-inch vinyl; CD; cassette	Columbia	
