= The Brand New Heavies discography =

- Studio albums: 11
- Live albums: 3
- Compilation albums: 5
- Remix albums: 4
- Singles: 32

This is the discography of acid jazz and funk group the Brand New Heavies.

== Albums ==
=== Studio albums ===
Title	Album details	Peak chart positions										Certifications
Title	Album details	UK	AUS	FRA	GER	JPN	NL	SWE	SWI	US	US R&B	Certifications
The Brand New Heavies	Released: 16 April 1990; Label: Acid Jazz, Delicious Vinyl; Formats: CD, LP, MC	25	139	—	—	—	—	—	—	—	17	UK: Silver
Heavy Rhyme Experience, Vol. 1	Released: 3 August 1992; Label: Acid Jazz, Delicious Vinyl; Formats: CD, LP, MC	38	—	—	—	—	—	—	—	139	49	
Brother Sister	Released: 4 April 1994; Label: FFRR, Delicious Vinyl; Formats: CD, 2×LP, MC	4	20	—	86	45	67	31	23	95	26	UK: Platinum
Shelter	Released: 21 April 1997; Label: FFRR, Delicious Vinyl; Formats: CD, 2×LP, MC	5	20	39	55	43	41	23	38	118	29	UK: Platinum
We Won't Stop	Released: January 2003; Label: Canyon; Formats: CD, 2×LP; Japan and Korea-only release	—	—	—	—	—	—	—	—	—	—	
Allabouthefunk	Released: 18 October 2004; Label: OneTwo; Formats: CD	122	—	138	—	148	—	—	81	—	—	
Get Used to It	Released: 27 June 2006; Label: Delicious Vinyl, OneTwo; Formats: CD, 2×LP, MC	—	—	—	—	—	—	—	—	—	79	
Dunk Your Trunk	Released: 28 November 2011; Label: Pedigree Cuts; Format: digital download	—	—	—	—	—	—	—	—	—	—	
Forward	Released: 9 April 2013; Label: HeavyTone; Formats: CD, digital download	162	—	—	—	—	—	—	—	—	58	
Sweet Freaks	Released: 24 October 2014; Label: earMUSIC; Formats: CD, digital download	—	—	—	—	—	—	—	—	—	—	
TBNH	Released: 6 September 2019; Label: Acid Jazz; Formats: CD, 2×LP, digital download	—	—	—	—	—	—	—	61	—	—	
"—" denotes items that did not chart or were not released in that territory.

=== Live albums ===
Title	Album details
Shibuya 357	Released: 2 May 1997; Label: Acid Jazz; Format: CD; Japan-only release
Live in London	Released: October 2009; Label: Live Here Now; Format: 2×CD
Live at the Soul Kitchen, Gothenburg	Released: 16 December 2015; Label: P-Vine; Format: CD, digital download; Japan-only release

=== Compilation albums ===
Title	Album details	Peak chart positions							Certifications
Title	Album details	UK	UK R&B	AUS	JPN	NL	SCO	SWE	Certifications
Original Flava	Released: 24 October 1994; Label: Acid Jazz; Formats: CD, LP, MC	—	—	—	—	—	—	—	
Dream Come True – The Best of the Acid Jazz Years	Released: 9 March 1998; Label: Music Club; Formats: CD	—	—	—	—	—	—	—	
Trunk Funk – The Best of the Brand New Heavies	Released: 13 September 1999; Label: FFRR/Acid Jazz; Formats: CD, MC	13	2	76	97	95	24	6	UK: Silver
The Platinum Collection	Released: 20 March 2006; Label: Rhino; Formats: CD	—	—	—	—	—	—	—	
The Best of 20 Years	Released: 4 November 2011; Label: Rhino; Format: CD	—	—	—	—	—	—	—	
Never Stop... The Best of	Released: 29 September 2023; Label: London Records; Format: 2×LP, 2×CD, streaming	—	3	—	—	—	89	—	
"—" denotes items that did not chart or were not released in that territory.

=== Remix albums ===
Title	Album details	Peak chart positions
Title	Album details	US R&B
Excursions: Remixes & Rare Grooves	Released: 20 February 1995; Label: Delicious Vinyl; Formats: CD, 2×LP, MC; US and Canada-only release	70
Elephantitis: The Funk + House Remixes	Released: 30 January 2007; Label: Funky Chemist; Format: CD; US-only release	—
Get Used to It – The Tom Moulton Mixes	Released: 5 August 2008; Label: Delicious Vinyl; Format: CD, digital download	—
Elephantitis: The Funk + House Remixes 2	Released: 20 October 2009; Label: Funky Chemist; Format: 2×CD; US-only release	—
"—" denotes items that did not chart.

== Singles ==
Title	Year	Peak chart positions										Certifications	Album
Title	Year	UK	UK R&B	CAN	GER	JPN	NL	NZ	SCO	US	US R&B	Certifications	Album
"Got to Give"	1988	104	—	—	—	—	—	—	—	—	—		Non-album singles
"People Get Ready"	1989	—	—	—	—	—	—	—	—	—	—		Non-album singles
"Dream Come True"	1990	107	—	—	—	—	—	—	—	—	63		The Brand New Heavies
"Never Stop"	1991	43	—	—	—	—	—	—	—	54	3		The Brand New Heavies
"Dream Come True" (re-issue)	1992	24	—	—	—	—	—	—	—	—	42		The Brand New Heavies
"Ultimate Trunk Funk" (EP) (Note: "Never Stop" and "Stay This Way" peaked at number 19 on the UK Singles Chart, on 25 April 1992, as part of the Ultimate Trunk Funk EP with "Never Stop" being the lead track. The other track on the EP was "Mr. Tanaka". "Stay This Way" didn't chart on its own, in the UK, in 1991, the song was released on its own, after its inclusion on the Ultimate Trunk Funk EP in December 1992, peaking at number 40 on 26 December.)	1992	19	—	—	—	—	—	—	—	—	—		The Brand New Heavies
"Don't Let It Go to Your Head"	1992	24	—	—	—	—	—	—	—	—	—		The Brand New Heavies
"Bonafide Funk" (featuring Main Source and Large Professor)	1992	—	—	—	—	—	—	—	—	—	—		Heavy Rhyme Experience, Vol. 1
"Stay This Way"	1992	40	—	—	88	—	—	—	—	—	19		The Brand New Heavies
"Dream On Dreamer"	1994	15	—	47	56	—	—	—	19	51	19		Brother Sister
"Back to Love"	1994	23	—	—	—	—	—	—	41	—	—		Brother Sister
"Midnight at the Oasis"	1994	13	—	—	68	—	—	48	11	—	—		Brother Sister
"Brother Sister"	1994	—	—	—	—	—	—	—	—	—	—		Brother Sister
"Spend Some Time"	1994	26	8	—	82	—	—	—	18	—	—		Brother Sister
"Close to You"	1995	38	5	—	75	—	—	—	40	—	—		Prêt-à-Porter
"Mind Trips"	1995	—	—	—	—	—	—	—	—	—	—		Excursions: Remixes and Rare Grooves
"Sometimes"	1997	11	3	71	—	—	83	—	16	88	20	UK: Silver	Shelter
"You Are the Universe"	1997	21	4	—	73	—	—	—	28	—	—		Shelter
"You've Got a Friend"	1997	9	—	—	77	—	79	—	13	—	—		Shelter
"You Can Do It"	1997	—	—	—	—	—	—	—	—	—	—		Shelter
"Shelter"	1998	31	—	—	—	—	—	—	27	—	—		Shelter
"Saturday Nite"	1999	35	5	—	—	—	—	—	41	—	—		Trunk Funk – The Best of the Brand New Heavies
"Apparently Nothing"	1999	32	4	—	—	—	—	—	45	—	—		Trunk Funk – The Best of the Brand New Heavies
"What Do You Take Me For?"	2003	—	—	—	—	—	—	—	—	—	—		We Won't Stop
"Boogie"	2004	66	15	—	—	—	—	—	—	—	—		Allabouthefunk
"Surrender"	2005	78	—	—	—	—	—	—	91	—	—		Allabouthefunk
"I Don't Know Why (I Love You)"	2007	188	12	—	—	—	—	—	—	—	—		Get Used to It
"Let's Do It Again"	2007	—	—	—	—	—	—	—	—	—	—		Get Used to It
"Sunlight"	2013	—	—	—	—	73	—	—	—	—	—		Forward
"Sweet Freeek"	2014	—	—	—	—	97	—	—	—	—	—		Sweet Freaks
"Getaway" (with N'Dea Davenport)	2019	—	—	—	—	—	—	—	—	—	—		TBNH
"These Walls" (with N'Dea Davenport)	2019	—	—	—	—	—	—	—	—	—	—		TBNH
"—" denotes items that did not chart or were not released in that territory.

== Other appearances ==
- 1992: "People Get Ready" (remix) on Juice
- 1994: "Close to You" on Prêt-à-Porter
- 1994: "Higher Learning/Time for Change" on Higher Learning
- 1996: "World Keeps Spinning" on The Truth About Cats & Dogs
- 1997: "I Like It" on Love Jones
- 1998: "More Love" on Sliding Doors
- 1999: "Midnight at the Oasis" on American Pie
- 2006: "Jump n' Move" on Happy Feet
