= Trunk Funk – The Best of The Brand New Heavies =

Trunk Funk - The Best of The Brand New Heavies

Greatest hits album by The Brand New Heavies
- Released: 13 September 1999 (Trunk Funk); 17 October 2000 (Trunk Funk Classics)
- Genre: Acid jazz; funk
- Label: FFRR; Delicious Vinyl

The Brand New Heavies chronology
Shelter (1997)	Trunk Funk - The Best of The Brand New Heavies (1999)	We Won't Stop (2003)

Singles from Trunk Funk – The Best of The Brand New Heavies
- 1. "Saturday Nite" Released: 30 August 1999; 2. "Apparently Nothing" Released: 17 January 2000

Trunk Funk Classics 1991–2000

Following a 10-year tenure with their record labels, funk band the Brand New Heavies released two greatest hits albums titled Trunk Funk, a wordplay on the band's long standing elephant logo.

== Background ==
Trunk Funk – The Best of The Brand New Heavies was released on 13 September 1999 in the UK on FFRR Records. It highlights the group's dance- and pop-oriented UK hits, with many appearing in remixed, edited, or radio-friendly formats. Because lead singer Siedah Garrett left the band in 1998, and previous lead N'Dea Davenport was promoting her solo debut, UK singer Carleen Anderson filled in on vocals for this album. Three new recordings appear here, "Try My Love", the Marvin Gaye redux "Saturday Nite", and a cover of "Apparently Nothing", originally done by Anderson's former band Young Disciples. This compilation was not released in the United States.

Trunk Funk Classics 1991–2000 was released on 17 October 2000 in the US by Delicious Vinyl Records. This collection has an entirely different track listing than the above release. Whereas the UK Trunk Funk release highlighted dance- and pop-oriented Heavies singles, this release focuses on '70s soul-influenced cuts like "Brother Sister", the J. Dilla remix of "Sometimes" featuring rapper Q-Tip, and "Put the Funk Back in It". The US Trunk Funk also includes two tracks from Heavy Rhyme Experience, Vol. 1, the band's collaboration with a host of hip-hop artists. Among the previously unreleased tracks are the video edit of "Dream Come True '92" and the new track "Finish What You Started" marking lead singer N'Dea Davenport's return to the band.

== Track listing ==
=== International release ===
Trunk Funk – The Best of The Brand New Heavies (international release)

No.	Title	Writer(s)	Featured vocalist(s)	Length
1.	"Saturday Nite"	(J. Kincaid/L. Hamblin/S. Law/M. Gaye)	Carleen Anderson	4:33
2.	"Dream Come True"		N'Dea Davenport	7:46
3.	"Never Stop" (David Morales Remix Single Edit)		N'Dea Davenport	3:54
4.	"Stay This Way" (The Heavy Mix 7")		N'Dea Davenport	4:09
5.	"Dream On Dreamer" (Heavies Radio Version)		N'Dea Davenport	3:35
6.	"Back to Love" (Radio Remix)		Jan Kincaid, N'Dea Davenport	4:10
7.	"Midnight at the Oasis" (Radio Version)	(D. Nichtern)	N'Dea Davenport	3:47
8.	"BNH"		-	4:28
9.	"You Are the Universe" (Radio Version)		Siedah Garrett	3:41
10.	"Forever" (Soulpower Remix)		N'Dea Davenport	5:24
11.	"Shelter" (Spike's Remix)		Jan Kincaid, Siedah Garrett	3:47
12.	"Sometimes"		Siedah Garrett	4:01
13.	"Spend Some Time" (Radio Version)	(A. Levy/A. Cheung)	N'Dea Davenport	3:38
14.	"You've Got a Friend" (Radio Version)	(C. King)	Siedah Garrett	3:26
15.	"Close to You"		N'Dea Davenport	4:04
16.	"Gimme One of Those"		-	3:42
17.	"Apparently Nothing"	(C. Anderson/M. Nelson)	Carleen Anderson	4:24
18.	"Try My Love"		Carleen Anderson	3:46

=== US release ===
Trunk Funk Classics 1991–2000 (US release)

No.	Title	Writer(s)	Featured vocalist(s)	Length
1.	"Finish What You Started"	C. Folmer, S. Bartholomew, J. Kincaid, A. Levy	N'Dea Davenport	4:29
2.	"Brother Sister"	N. Davenport, S. Bartholomew, J. Kincaid, A. Levy	N'Dea Davenport	4:49
3.	"Put the Funk Back in It"	S. Bartholomew, L. Gordon, J. Kincaid, A. Levy, J. Wellman	-	3:19
4.	"Stay This Way"	J. Wellman	N'Dea Davenport	5:43
5.	"Back to Love"	J. Kincaid	Jan Kincaid, N'Dea Davenport	4:38
6.	"Have a Good Time"	N. Davenport, S. Bartholomew, J. Kincaid, A. Levy	N'Dea Davenport	3:13
7.	"Bonafide Funk"	S. Bartholomew, J. Kincaid, A. Levy, K. McKenzie	Main Source	3:59
8.	"Never Stop"	J. Kincaid	N'Dea Davenport	4:14
9.	"Forever"	J. Kincaid	N'Dea Davenport	5:12
10.	"Dream On Dreamer"	D. Austin, N. Davenport	N'Dea Davenport	4:02
11.	"Sometimes" (The Ummah Remix)	S. Garrett, J. Kincaid	Siedah Garrett, Q-Tip	4:12
12.	"Gimmie One of Those"	J. Kincaid, J. Wellman, L. Gordon, S. Bartholomew	-	3:43
13.	"Soul Flower"	S. Bartholomew, T. Hardson, J. Kincaid, A. Levy, R. Robinson	The Pharcyde	3:42
14.	"Dream Come True '92" (Video Edit)	A. Levy, J. Kincaid, J. Wellman, L. Gordon, L. Muriel, S. Bartholomew	N'Dea Davenport	4:25
15.	"Saturday Nite" (Jay Dee Remix)	J. Kincaid, L. Hamblin, M. Gaye, S. Law	Carleen Anderson	5:01

== Personnel ==
- Carleen Anderson – vocals on "Saturday Nite", "Apparently Nothing", and "Try My Love"
- Simon Bartholomew – guitar, percussion & background vocals
- N'Dea Davenport – percussion, keyboards, vocals, background vocals on tracks
- Siedah Garrett – vocals on tracks "Sometimes", "You Are the Universe", "You've Got a Friend", and "Shelter"
- Jan Kincaid – percussion, drums, keyboards, vocals, background vocals
- Andrew Levy – bass, percussion, keyboards, background vocals, string arrangements

== Charts ==
Chart performance for Trunk Funk – The Best of The Brand New Heavies
Chart (1999)	Peak position
Australian Albums (ARIA)	76
Dutch Albums (Album Top 100)	95
Scottish Albums (OCC)	24
Swedish Albums (Sverigetopplistan)	6
UK Albums (OCC)	13
UK R&B Albums (OCC)	2

== Certifications ==
Region	Certification	Certified units/sales
United Kingdom (BPI)	Silver	60,000^{^}
^{^} Shipments figures based on certification alone.
