= N'Dea Davenport discography =

This is the discography documenting albums and singles released by American singer N'Dea Davenport.

== Albums ==
Title	Details	Peak chart positions		
Title	Details	US R&B	US Heatseekers	AUS
N'Dea Davenport	Released: June 30, 1998; Label: V2 Records; Formats: LP, CD, digital download	56	14	77

== Singles ==
Year	Title	Chart positions				Album
Year	Title	US R&B	US Dance	AUS	UK	Album
1998	"Bring It On"	75	—	109	52	N'Dea Davenport
1998	"Bullshittin'"	—	—	—	—	N'Dea Davenport
1999	"Underneath a Red Moon"	—	—	—	—	N'Dea Davenport
1999	"Whatever You Want"	—	—	—	—	N'Dea Davenport
2006	"One Day My Love"	—	10	—	—	Non-album single
2011	"Destiny"	—	—	—	—	Non-album single
2011	"Love with Desire"	—	—	—	—	Non-album single
2013	"I Might Do Something Wrong"	—	—	—	—	Non-album single

=== Featured singles ===
Year	Title	Chart positions			Album
Year	Title	UK	US R&B	AUS	Album
1993	"Trust Me" (Guru featuring N'Dea Davenport)	34	—	—	Guru's Jazzmatazz, Vol. 1
1995	"Freedom (Theme from Panther)" (with Various artists)	—	18	—	Panther
2001	"You Can't Change Me" (Roger Sanchez featuring Armand Van Helden and N'Dea Davenport)	25	—	45	First Contact
2015	"Touch the Sky" (Guri Guri Boys featuring N'Dea Davenport)	—	—	—	Non-album single

== Additional information ==
- The acid jazz label applied to The Brand New Heavies music was popularized by Eddie Piller and British record executive Gilles Peterson, perhaps in hopes that he could keep interest in the music on a par with the then-ubiquitous acid house music. The musical style was patterned after an admiration for 1970s funk ranging from James Brown to Rufus and the Average White Band. Peterson named his fledgling label Acid Jazz Records as well, and the Heavies recorded for this label in the United Kingdom.
- Davenport recut the vocal track on "Never Stop", "Stay This Way" and "Dream Come True", after Jay Ella Ruth (the band's prior lead vocalist and co-writer) had ceased to be a member of the group, but preceding the major release of these recordings.
- Davenport participated in sessions for both Malcolm McLaren's Waltz Darling and Madonna's I'm Breathless. The similarities between the videos (Deep in Vogue and Vogue) is a source for debate.
- Davenport recorded Buddy Johnson's Save Your Love For Me, a song which has been covered many times and was a big hit for Nancy Wilson.
- Davenport appeared in the music video for Breakfast Club's "Right on Track", singing back-up dressed as a singing hen in 1987.
- Davenport appeared in the 1988 music video for Steve Winwood's "Roll with it" which was choreographed by Paula Abdul.
- Davenport was the female backing vocalist on Gregg Alexander's 1989 debut album Michigan Rain. Future releases by Alexander would feature Danielle Brisebois as both female backing vocalist and co-writer, but at this point the two had not met.
- Davenport appeared on 2 Hip 4 TV.
- Davenport is also a drummer.
- Davenport is a spinto soprano.

== Notable collaborations ==
- Davenport provides vocals on Michael Paulo's "One Passion." Track: "If You Ever Change Your Mind." (1989)
- Davenport provides vocals on Dead Prez's Turn off the Radio: The Mixtape Vol. 3: Pulse Of The People.
- Davenport provides vocals on Dilouya's album Faithful Circus. Track "The Right Time".
- Davenport provides vocals on DJ Krush's album 漸-Zen. Track: "With Grace".
- Davenport provides vocals on the Everlast (House of Pain) album Eat at Whitey's. Tracks: "Love for Real" and "One and the Same".
- Davenport provides vocals on Fred Everything's album Lost Together. Track: "Don't Nobody".
- Davenport provides vocals on José Padilla's album Navigator. Track: "The Look of Love".
- Davenport provides vocals on Natalie Merchant's album Ophelia. Track: "Break Your Heart".
- Davenport provides vocals on Robbie Williams's "Lovelight", both a CD single and a track on the album Rudebox. Fellow Brand New Heavies member Andrew Levy provided bass.
- Davenport provides vocals on Sly and Robbie's album Version Born. Track: "For the Living".
- Davenport provides vocals/writing on Return of the Headhunters!! with The Headhunters Band. Tracks: "Tip Toe", "Watch your back" (with Tre Hardson).
- Davenport provides vocals/writing on Roger Sanchez's #1 European dance album First Contact. Track: "You can't change me" (with Armand Van Helden).
- Davenport provides vocals/writing on Okino Shuya (Kyoto Jazz Massive)'s album Destiny. Tracks: "Deep into Sunshine", "Destiny", "Look ahead".
- Davenport provides vocals/writing on DJ Kawasaki (Okino Yoshihiro/Kyoto Jazz Massive)'s album Black & Gold. Track: "Ain't No Mountain High Enough".
- Davenport provides vocals on Gabor Deutsch's Maxi Single "Love With Desire" (2011)
- Davenport provides vocals on Horse Meat Disco's album Love and Dancing. Track: "Fight For Love" (2020)
