= N'Dea Davenport (album) =

1998 studio album by N'Dea Davenport

Studio album by N'Dea Davenport
- Released: June 30, 1998
- Recorded: 1989, 1996–1997
- Genre: R&B
- Length: 55:25
- Label: V2
- Producer: N'Dea Davenport; Dallas Austin; Paul Powell

Singles from N'Dea Davenport
- 1. "Bring It On" Released: May 19, 1998; 2. "Bullshittin'" Released: September 29, 1998; 3. "Underneath a Red Moon" Released: November 2, 1998

N'Dea Davenport is the debut solo studio album by American singer-songwriter N'Dea Davenport. It was released on June 30, 1998, by Delicious Vinyl and V2 Records. Intended to be recorded shortly after Davenport signed to Delicious Vinyl in 1989, recording sessions were halted after she joined the Brand New Heavies in 1990. Co-produced by Dallas Austin and Paul Powell, the album incorporated elements of R&B, jazz, and blues.

== Background and development ==
In 1989, Davenport secured a recording contract with Delicious Vinyl through her musical collaborations with their roster of artists including Tone Loc and Def Jef. Recording sessions for Davenport's album were halted when label-mates and English band The Brand New Heavies were in need of a female lead vocalist to replace Jaye Ella Ruth, who had left. At the recommendation of Delicious Vinyl record label owners Matt Dike and Michael Ross, The Brand New Heavies added Davenport to their lineup. The Brand New Heavies released a re-recorded version of their debut self-titled album which featured Davenport's vocals. The album became the band's first charting album and peaked at number twenty-four on the UK Albums Chart and earned a silver-certification by the British Phonographic Industry (BPI). The band reissued their singles; "Dream Come True", "Stay This Way", and "Don't Let It Go to Your Head" with Davenport's vocals, all of which peaked in the top forty on the UK Singles Chart.

The band's success continued with the release of their third studio album Brother Sister in 1994, which peaked at number four on the UK Albums Chart and earned platinum-certification by the BPI. The album spawned the single "Dream On Dreamer" which became crossover hit, peaking within the top twenty on several international music charts. By late 1995, Davenport left the group due to creative differences and personal conflicts with the group. In 1997, Davenport's contract with Delicious Vinyl was bought out by V2 Records.

== Recording and production ==
N'Dea Davenport began recording her album in 1996. She worked with American music producer and songwriter Dallas Austin at Riversound Studios in Atlanta, Georgia. Austin originally wanted to produce the entire album, but ultimately produced only four songs for the album, two of which he co-wrote with Davenport. She also co-produced a song "Placement for the Baby" with Paul Powell. She recorded and produced the remainder of the album at Skip Sailor Studios (Los Angeles, California), Natoma Studios (San Francisco, California), and Woodland Studios (Nashville, Tennessee). Davenport played various instruments on the album including drums, tambourine, and grand piano N'Dea Davenport incorporates elements of R&B, jazz, and blues.

== Release and promotion ==
The album was originally scheduled to be released in late 1997 but was pushed back due to Delicious Vinyl and its joint venture company experiencing bankruptcy. In collaboration with Delicious Vinyl, V2 Records released N'Dea Davenport on June 30, 1998. Most copies were pressed by V2 Records. By 2001, the album had gone out of print after V2 Records dissolved.

== Critical reception ==
Professional ratings
Review scores
Source	Rating
AllMusic	4/5 stars
The Guardian	4/5 stars

AllMusic's William Cooper praised Davenport's standout performance and solo effort on the album. He commented: "Though much of her work with the Brand New Heavies was brilliant, N'Dea Davenport is more daring and diverse, and no less enjoyable. Fans of the Brand New Heavies' flashy acid jazz stylings will no doubt be surprised with N'Dea Davenport's more organic approach, but the album will quickly win them over. N'Dea Davenport is a fine debut from an incredibly talented and inspired performer." The Guardian wrote that Davenport's "voice is full of light and shade, her singing unsurpassably elegant."

== Commercial performance ==
N'Dea Davenport debuted at number fifty-six on the US Top R&B Albums chart in the week of July 18, 1998. The following week, the album fell to number seventy. The album continued to drop and fell to number eighty-four in its third week. The album fell to the hundredth position in its fifth and final week on the charts. N'Dea Davenport peaked higher on the Top Heatseekers Albums chart, where it debuted at number fourteen.

== Track listing ==
1. "Whatever You Want" (N'Dea Davenport, Glen Patscha) – 4:31
2. "Underneath a Red Moon" (Davenport, Colin Wolfe) – 4:16
3. "Save Your Love for Me" (Davenport, Damon Malone) – 4:07
4. "When the Night Falls" (Davenport, Patscha) – 4:50
5. "Bring It On" (Davenport, Dallas Austin, Brady Blade, Wolfe) – 4:22
6. "No Never Again" (Davenport, Austin) – 5:14
7. "In Wonder" (Davenport) – 4:06
8. "Bullshittin'" (Davenport, Blade) – 3:34
9. "Real Life" (Davenport, Daniel Lanois) – 3:06; feat. Daniel Lanois
10. "Old Man" (Neil Young) – 4:00
11. "Placement for the Baby" (Davenport, Paul Powell) – 6:25
12. "Oh Mother Earth (Embrace)" (Davenport, Austin) – 3:52
13. "Getaway" (Davenport) – 3:30; featuring the Rebirth Brass Band
- Additional track on double LP release:

14. "Bullshittin' (B.S.'n...)" (Davenport, Blade, Mos Def) – 4:18; featuring Mos Def

== Personnel ==
- N'Dea Davenport – vocals, grand piano, Omnichord, tambourine
- Doyle Bramhall II, Tomi Martin, Buddy Miller, Daniel Lanois – electric guitar
- James LeBlanc – electric guitar, steel guitar
- Paul Powell – guitar, synthesizer, drums
- Derwin Perkins – rhythm guitar
- Al Berry, Daryl Johnson, Robby Emerson – bass guitar
- Colin Wolfe – bass guitar, keyboards
- Glenn Patscha, Dallas Austin, Duane Dupry – keyboards
- Tom Knight, Brady Blade – drums
- E.J. Rodriguez – percussion
- Paul Shapiro – saxophone, flute
- Darrell Mims – flute
- Dan Levine – trombone
- Bob Brockmann – flugelhorn
- Eric Freidlander – cello
- Jay Dee – remix on "Bullshittin'"

== Charts ==
Chart performance for N'Dea Davenport
Chart (1998)	Peak position
Australian Albums (ARIA)	77
UK Independent Albums (OCC)	14
US Top Heatseekers Albums (Billboard)	14
US Top R&B/Hip-Hop Albums (Billboard)	56
