= Dream On Dreamer =

Dream On Dreamer may refer to:

- Dream On Dreamer (song), a 1994 Brand New Heavies song
- Dream On Dreamer (band), an Australian metalcore band
