= Forward (Brand New Heavies album) =

Studio album by The Brand New Heavies
- Released: April 2013
- Genre: Funk, R&B
- Length: 1:03:35
- Label: HeavyTone Records
- Producer: The Brand New Heavies

The Brand New Heavies chronology
| Dunk Your Trunk (2011) | Forward (2013) | Sweet Freaks (2014) |

Forward is a studio album by the Brand New Heavies released in 2013 on HeavyTone Records. The album peaked at No. 15 on the UK Hip Hop and R&B Albums Chart and No. 37 on the UK Independent Singles and Albums Chart.

== Critical reception ==
Professional ratings
Review scores
| Source | Rating |
|---|---|
| AllMusic | 3.5/5 stars |
| Daily Express | 3/5 stars |

Andy Kellman of AllMusic, in a 3.5/5 star review, with praise wrote "Forward is more uptempo and disco-oriented than the slower and slightly funkier Get Used to It. N'Dea Davenport joins the band's core trio once more...Forward is a delightful return that focuses on the Heavies' love of smooth late-'70s/early-'80s sounds."

Ken Capobianco of the Boston Globe claimed, "The Brit funk-soul band’s first record in six years is a solid, if uneven, effort that marks a reunion with N’Dea Davenport...The Heavies hardly veer from their organic party vibe, and it sounds as if the last 15 years in pop music never happened...Mostly, the Heavies stay true to the groove."

Stephen Unwin of the Daily Express, in a 3/5 star review, remarked, "Sitting pretty on that CD stack, sandwiched between En Vogue and Sade, is something by The Brand New Heavies and it just, you know, feels right?"

== Track listing ==
| No. | Title | Writer(s) | Length |
|---|---|---|---|
| 1. | "Forward" | Simon Bartholomew, Jan Kincaid, Andrew Levy | 4:02 |
| 2. | "Sunlight" | Rita Campbell, Jan Kincaid, Tim Laws | 6:59 |
| 3. | "Do You Remember" | N'Dea Davenport, Andrew Levy, Johan Jones Wetterberg | 4:02 |
| 4. | "On the One" | Jan Kincaid | 4:57 |
| 5. | "A Little Funk in Your Pocket" | Simon Bartholomew, Marc Jackson Burrows, Dawn Joseph, Jan Kincaid, Andrew Levy | 3:30 |
| 6. | "Addicted" | N'Dea Davenport, Andrew Levy | 4:11 |
| 7. | "Lifestyle" | Simon Bartholomew, Jan Kincaid, Andrew Levy | 3:45 |
| 8. | "Itzine" | Simon Bartholomew, Jan Kincaid, Andrew Levy | 4:27 |
| 9. | "The Way It Goes" | Simon Bartholomew, Jan Kincaid, Andrew Levy | 3:24 |
| 10. | "Lights" | Simon Bartholomew | 4:11 |
| 11. | "Turn the Music Up" | The Players Association, Laurel Dann, Chris Hills | 4:33 |
| 12. | "Heaven" | Jan Kincaid, Andrew Levy | 4:11 |
| 13. | "Spice of Life" | Simon Bartholomew | 5:10 |
| 14. | "One More for the Road" | Jan Kincaid | 6:13 |
