= Sulene Fleming =

British singer and songwriter

- Born: 25 January 1978 (age 48)
- Origin: Bradford, West Yorkshire, England
- Genres: Acid jazz; funk; soul; House music; Dance music; dance
- Occupations: Singer; songwriter; producer
- Instruments: Vocals; percussion
- Years active: 1998–present
- Website: sulenefleming.com

Sulene Fleming (born 25 January 1978) is a British singer and songwriter, best known as the lead vocalist for the band the Brand New Heavies from 2016 to 2018.

== Biography ==
Fleming started singing at an early age, discovering diverse music styles (soul, funk and disco) in her mother's record collection. Her main influence at an early age was the vocal style of Phyllis Hyman, Betty Wright, Aretha Franklin and Chaka Khan among many soulful artists. From age 15, she started performing with several local bands in Bradford, singing lead and background vocals. She worked as a session singer when she was just eighteen years old, she started demoing songs for EMI, Peer and Sony Music for their songwriters and producers.

Fleming worked with Stargate Productions in 1998. She sessioned with this production team for two years, recording in Trondheim, Norway.

During this period she worked on The New Master Sounds first record in 2001, she wrote the lyrics for the track "Turn This Thing Around" on the album Keb Darge Presents The New Master Sounds. She toured live on and off with The New Master Sounds for a couple of years and they released one more record together Get Back before they then became an instrumental outfit.

Fleming toured with various bands over the course of three years and started to write songs for music production companies such as Audio Network. In 2005, Fleming formed the band Sweet Suzi which were a pop/rock band, they wrote over an albums worth of songs and toured with the likes of INME, Terrorvision and Wednesday 13. The band split up in 2007 and Fleming went back to the pop circuit touring with pop bands. In 2008, Fleming recorded the vocal on "Land Of Dance" by Sy & Unknown, which was on the True Hardcore 2 compilation by Storm and Whizzkid. This was her first entry into the dance music world.

In 2010, Soulheat Records released a track which Fleming co-wrote with Kehoe and Harmony called "Sunshine In This Heart Of Mine", which was featured on the Ministry Of Sound's Housexy Summer compilation. On moving to London from the North in 2009 she had joined a band called The Fantastics who had already had success on the funk scene. In 2011, they went on to produce All The People, an album including four vocal tunes which Fleming had written. She continues to perform and write with the band.

In 2012, Fleming teamed up with T-Roy from Broadcite music and they wrote the deep house track "A New Love", which came out on Broadcite Music including remixes from Khyan and DJ Steph. Later in 2015, they released another deep house EP called "The Rhythm", which included remixes from Daz I Kue, Uchikawa LoftSoul and T-Roy. Fleming sang back up vocals for international artists such as Leroy Hutson in 2017 and 2018, Deneice Williams, Barbara Mason, The Valentine Brothers, Randy Brown and Alton Mclain in 2018. In 2015, Fleming joined Bluey of Incognito's band Citrus Sun for a tour of Japan and later that year she also contributed vocal work for the acid jazz band Incognito.

Fleming released the album Loveland in 2015 on VeeGee Records with co-writer Nick Van Gelder (original Jamiroquai drummer). In 2016, she teamed up with musician and composer Dimitris Dimopoulos, they then released the album Sparkle on Splash Productions. The album hit number one in the UK Soul Chart.

From 2016 to 2018, Fleming toured with the Brand New Heavies as their featured vocalist. They toured in the UK, Spain, Holland, Sweden, Germany, Serbia and Japan.

In 2019, she started to work with Dr Robert from The Blow Monkeys in association with Monks Road Records. Fleming sang on numerous records for the Monks Road Social Projects, including the albums, Out Of Bounds and Humanism; this is where she met Matt Deighton who is the lead singer of acid jazz band Mother Earth. Fleming now sings with Mother Earth, which includes Mick Talbot from The Style Council, Crispin Taylor and Ernie McKone.

In 2020 Fleming features on Stone Foundations album Is Love Enough? the album includes Paul Weller and Peter Capaldi among others.

== Discography ==
=== Appearances and as featured artist ===
- Sulene Fleming – "I Need A Lover" – Singles and Remixes (2020)
- Monks Road Social – " Humanism" (Featured Artist) (2020)
- Sulene Fleming – " Solo" – (More Remixes) – Moodymanc and Dominic Dawson – Singles – (2020)
- Sulene Fleming – " Solo" – EP (2019)
- Sulene Fleming – " Solo" – Single – and Remixes by – Lenny Fontana (2019)
- Mother Earth – Soona Than Much Layta – EP (2019)
- Monks Road Social – "Out Of Bounds" (Featured Artist) Album (2019)
- Luxury Soul Compilation – Expansion Records (2018)
- Dimitris and Sulene – "Sparkle album" – (2017)
- Dimitris and Sulene – "Sparkle the remixes" – (2017)
- Ryle – "The Adventures Of Jefferson Keyes" – Featured Artist (2016)
- Incognito – In Search Of Better Days album Backing vocal on Loves Revival (2016)
- Craig Charles – "The Craig Charles Funk and Club" (2016)
- Van Gelder-Fleming – Loveland (Remixes) – EP (2015)
- Van Gelder-Fleming – You Gotta Get on Up (Remixes) – EP (2015)
- Van Gelder Fleming – "Loveland" album (2015)
- Soul Funk Secret – City Life – EP (2015)
- T-Roy – " The Rhythm" – EP (2015)
- Soul Funk Secret – "Bright Sunshine" – single (2014)
- Real Side Records Present: – Soul on the Real Side Vol. 3 (2013)
- Craig Charles – The Craig Charles Funk & Soul Club (2012)
- T-Roy – "A New Love" – EP (2012)
- The Fantastics feat. Sulene Fleming – All the People – album (2011)
- The Fantastics feat. Sulene Fleming – "Cold Case" – single (2011)
- The Fantastics feat. Sulene Fleming – "Somewhere Finally" – single (2011)
- The Fantastics feat. Sulene Fleming – "I Breathe" – single (2011)
- Kehoe and Harmony – " Sunshine In This Heart Of Mine" – EP (2010)
- True Hardcore 2 – Sy and Unknown featuring Sulene Fleming – Land Of dance – (2008)
- The Haggis Horns- " Hot Damn album – Backing vocals – Tribe Vibes (2005)
- Newmastersounds – "Get Back, Can't Hold Me Down" (2003)
- The New Mastersounds – "Turn This Thing Around" (2001)
