= Maria Muldaur (album) =

Studio album by Maria Muldaur
- Released: August 1973
- Studios: Warner Bros. Studios, North Hollywood, California
- Genres: Pop, R&B
- Length: 36:38
- Label: Reprise
- Producers: Joe Boyd, Lenny Waronker

Maria Muldaur chronology
Maria Muldaur (1973)	Waitress in a Donut Shop (1974)

Maria Muldaur is the 1973 debut album of the American singer Maria Muldaur. The album includes "Midnight at the Oasis", her best-known single, which charted at number 6 on the Billboard Hot 100 and "Three Dollar Bill", which charted at number 7 on the Billboard Adult Contemporary charts. The album, which peaked at number 3 on the Billboard 200, was certified gold by the RIAA on May 13, 1974. A pop and R&B album which is heavily influenced by country and blues.

== Critical reception ==
Professional ratings
Review scores
Source	Rating
AllMusic	4/5 stars
Robert Christgau	B+

The album was positively reviewed, and very positively in at least one case. Writing in October 1973, Rolling Stone's reviewer Jon Landau described the album as "one of the half-dozen best" of the year, "the kind of glorious breakthrough that reminds me why I fell in love with rock & roll."

== Track listing ==
Side one

1. "Any Old Time" (Jimmie Rodgers) – 3:45
2. "Midnight at the Oasis" (David Nichtern) – 3:49
3. "My Tennessee Mountain Home" (Dolly Parton) – 3:32
4. "I Never Did Sing You a Love Song" (Nichtern) – 2:49
5. "The Work Song" (Kate McGarrigle) – 4:04

Side two

1. "Don't You Feel My Leg (Don't You Get Me High)" (Blue Lu Barker, Danny Barker, J. Mayo Williams) – 2:48
2. "Walkin' One and Only" (Dan Hicks) – 2:47
3. "Long Hard Climb" (Ron Davies) – 3:03
4. "Three Dollar Bill" (Mac Rebennack) – 3:58
5. "Vaudeville Man" (Wendy Waldman) – 2:41
6. "Mad Mad Me" (Wendy Waldman) – 3:13

== Personnel ==
- Maria Muldaur – vocals
- Clarence White – acoustic guitar ("My Tennessee Home" and "The Work Song")
- Bill Keith – banjo ("Work Song" and "Vaudeville Man"), steel guitar ("Long Hard Climb" and "I Never Did Sing You a Love Song")
- Ry Cooder – acoustic guitar ("Any Old Time")
- David Lindley – Hawaiian guitar ("Any Old Time")
- Andrew Gold – acoustic guitar ("Vaudeville Man")
- David Nichtern – acoustic ("Long Hard Climb", "I Never Did Sing You a Love Song", "My Tennessee Home", "The Work Song", "Walkin' One and Only" and "Midnight at the Oasis" & electric guitar ("Long Hard Climb"), producer ("Mad Mad Me")
- David Grisman – mandolin ("My Tennessee Home")
- Dr. John – keyboards ("Vaudeville Man', "Don't You Feel My Leg" and "Three Dollar Bill"), horn arrangements ("Vaudeville Man", "Don't You Feel My Leg" and "Three Dollar Bill")
- Jim Dickinson – piano ("Any Old Time")
- Mark T. Jordan – piano ("The Work Song" and "Midnight at the Oasis")
- Spooner Oldham – piano ("Long Hard Climb" and "I Never Did Sing You a Love Song")
- Greg Prestopino – piano ("Mad Mad Me"), background vocals ("The Work Song" and "My Tennessee Home"), voices ("Midnight at the Oasis")
- James Gordon – organ ("Three Dollar Bill"), clarinet ("Vaudeville Man")
- Chris Ethridge – bass guitar ("Long Hard Climb", "I Never Did Sing You a Love Song", "My Tennessee Home" and "The Work Song")
- Klaus Voormann – bass guitar ("Vaudeville Man" and "Don't You Feel My Leg")
- Ray Brown – bass guitar ("Walkin' One and Only")
- Dave Holland – bowed bass ("Mad Mad Me")
- Jimmy Calhoun – bass guitar ("Three Dollar Bill")
- Tommy McClure – bass guitar ("Any Old Time")
- Freebo – bass guitar ("Midnight at the Oasis")
- Amos Garrett – bass guitar, guitar, vocals, guitar solo ("Midnight at the Oasis")
- Jim Keltner – drums (all but 4 tracks)
- Ed Shaughnessy – drums ("Walkin' One and Only")
- John Boudreaux – drums ("Three Dollar Bill")
- Jim Gordon – drums ("Midnight at the Oasis")
- Chris Parker – drums ("Mad Mad Me")
- Jerry Jumonville – alto horn, horn arrangements ("Vaudeville Man", "Don't You Feel My Leg", "Three Dollar Bill")
- Artie Butler – alto horn, horn arrangements ("The Work Song")
- Nick DeCaro – accordion ("I Never Did Sing You a Love Song"), string arrangements ("Long Hard Climb", "I Never Did Sing You a Love Song" and "Midnight at the Oasis")
- Richard Greene – violin ("My Tennessee Home" and "Walkin' One and Only")
- Larry Packer – violin, viola ("Mad Mad Me")
- Karen Alexander – background vocals ("The Work Song")
- Gloria Jones – background vocals ("Three Dollar Bill")
- Ellen Kearney – background vocals ("My Tennessee Home", "The Work Song")
- Bettye LaVette – background vocals ("Three Dollar Bill")
- Jessica Smith – background vocals ("Three Dollar Bill")
- Beryl Marriott – violin

== Charts ==
=== Weekly charts ===
Chart (1974)	Peak position
Australian Albums (Kent Music Report)	30
Canada Top Albums/CDs (RPM)	3
US Billboard 200	3

=== Year-end charts ===
Chart (1974)	Position
Canada Top Albums/CDs (RPM)	33
US Billboard 200	15
