= TBNH =

Studio album by The Brand New Heavies
- Released: September 2019
- Genre: Funk, R&B
- Length: 55:18
- Label: Acid Jazz
- Producer: Andrew Levy, Simon Bartholomew, Mark Ronson, Ivan Jackson, Tristan Longworth

The Brand New Heavies chronology
| Sweet Freaks (2014) | TBNH (2019) |

TBNH is a studio album by the Brand New Heavies released in 2019 on Acid Jazz Records. The album peaked at No. 4 on the UK Hip Hop and R&B Albums Chart, No. 8 on the UK Independent Albums Chart and No. 37 on the Scottish Albums Chart.

== Critical reception ==
Professional ratings
Review scores
| Source | Rating |
|---|---|
| Allmusic | 3.5/5 stars |
| Louder Than War | 3.5/5 stars |

Matt Mead of Louder Than War in a 3.5/5-star review, proclaimed, "The album has a smooth feel, touching a rare groove palate of delectableness...The overall consensus is a polished effort from the grand masters of British soul/funk/jazz."

Andy Kellman of Allmusic, in a 3.5/5-star review, found "The celebratory feeling is stronger on TBNH than it is on any of the Brand New Heavies' ten preceding studio albums...(they're) joined now by the bubbly but not saccharine Angela Ricci. The vocalist is the lead on only three songs, however, with past BNH members N'Dea Davenport and Siedah Garrett and other guests (including Angie Stone, Beverley Knight, and Jack Knight) taking turns on a set of fully decked-out disco."

== Track listing ==
| No. | Title | Writer(s) | Length |
|---|---|---|---|
| 1. | "Beautiful" | Simon Bartholomew, Marc JB, Beverley Knight | 2:56 |
| 2. | "Stupid Love" | Simon Bartholomew, Jenna G., Andrew Levy | 4:12 |
| 3. | "Just Believe in You" | Simon Bartholomew, Siedah Garrett, Marc JB, Andrew Levy | 5:05 |
| 4. | "Getaway" | N'Dea Davenport, Andrew Levy, Johan Jones Wetterberg | 3:30 |
| 5. | "Heat" | Simon Bartholomew, Honey Larochelle, Andrew Levy | 3:49 |
| 6. | "The Funk Is Back" | Simon Bartholomew | 3:29 |
| 7. | "Together" | Simon Bartholomew, Luke Harris, Andrew Levy, Hannah McGuigan, Matthew Steele | 4:30 |
| 8. | "These Walls" | Anna Christine, N'Dea Davenport, Kendrick Lamar, Rose Ann Martin, Rose McKinney, Terrace Jahmal Wise | 4:05 |
| 9. | "It's My Destiny" | Simon Bartholomew, Luke Harris, Andrew Levy, Matthew Steele | 4:08 |
| 10. | "Wired Up" | Simon Bartholomew, Robert Berkeley Davis, Jan Kincaid, Andrew Levy | 3:32 |
| 11. | "Dance It Out" | Andrew Levy, Hannah McGuigan | 3:38 |
| 12. | "Little Dancer" | Jack Knight, Patrik Magnusson, Emanuel Olsson, Rohan Ramström | 3:39 |
| 13. | "Dontcha Wanna" | Simon Bartholomew, Jim Hunt, Jan Kincaid, Andrew Levy, Matt Steele | 4:46 |
| 14. | "Get on the Right Side" | Simon Bartholomew, Nick Van Gelder | 3:59 |
