= You've Got a Friend =

1971 single by Carole King

- Norwegian single with "Beautiful" as B-side

Single by Carole King

from the album Tapestry
- Written: January 1971
- Released: 1971
- Studio: A&M (Hollywood, California)
- Genre: Soft rock
- Length: 5:09
- Label: Ode; A&M
- Songwriter: Carole King
- Producer: Lou Adler

Official audio
- "You've Got a Friend" on YouTube

"You've Got a Friend"

Single by James Taylor

from the album Mud Slide Slim and the Blue Horizon
- B-side: "You Can Close Your Eyes"
- Released: May 1971
- Genre: Folk rock; soft rock; pop
- Length: 4:29
- Label: Warner Bros.
- Songwriter: Carole King
- Producer: Peter Asher

James Taylor singles chronology
"Country Road" (1971)	"You've Got a Friend" (1971)	"You Can Close Your Eyes" (1971)

Audio sample
- "You've Got a Friend": file; help

"You've Got a Friend" is a 1971 song and single by American singer-songwriter Carole King. It was first recorded by King and included on her second studio album, Tapestry (1971). Another notable version, by James Taylor, appears on his album Mud Slide Slim and the Blue Horizon (1971). His version, which features backing vocals by Joni Mitchell, was released as a single in 1971, reaching number one on the Billboard Hot 100 and number four on the UK Singles Chart. The two versions were recorded simultaneously in 1971 with some shared musicians.

"You've Got a Friend" won Grammy Awards for both Taylor (Best Male Pop Vocal Performance) and King (Song of the Year) at the 14th Annual Grammy Awards in 1972. Dozens of other artists have recorded the song over the years, including Dusty Springfield, Michael Jackson, Anne Murray, and Donny Hathaway.

In 2001, Taylor's version was inducted into the Grammy Hall of Fame. King's version was inducted in 2002. In June 2026, Taylor's version was included in CBS News's list of the 250 most essential American songs of the past 250 years.

== History ==
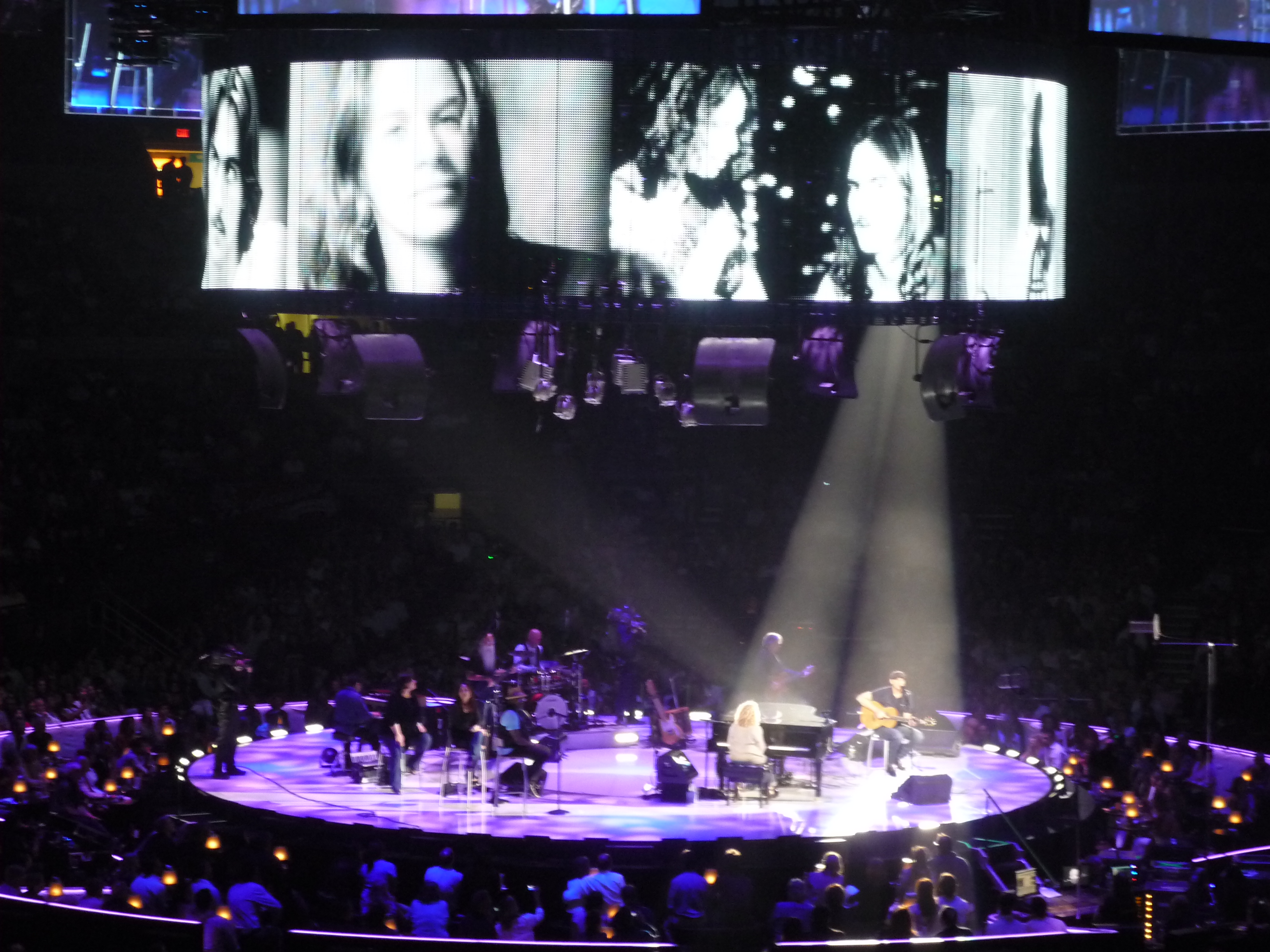
James Taylor and Carole King at the 2010 Troubadour Reunion Tour

Carole King wrote "You've Got a Friend" during the January 1971 recording sessions for her album Tapestry, when James Taylor was also recording his album Mud Slide Slim and the Blue Horizon. She has said that "the song was as close to pure inspiration as I've ever experienced. The song wrote itself. It was written by something outside myself, through me." According to Taylor, King told him that the song was a response to a line in his earlier song "Fire and Rain" ("I've seen lonely times when I could not find a friend"). King said in a 1972 interview that she "didn't write it with James or anybody really specifically in mind. But when James heard it he really liked it and wanted to record it". Both King and Taylor recorded the song for their respective albums, and Taylor and Danny Kortchmar perform on both versions.

Taylor's version was released as a single and reached number 1 on the Billboard Hot 100 (his only song to do so) and number 4 on the UK Singles Chart. Taylor's version also spent a week atop the Easy Listening charts. Billboard ranked it as the No. 16 song for 1971.

Taylor's Apple Records labelmate Mary Hopkin has said that he gave her a chance to record the song, which she declined, a decision she later regretted.

Taylor and King performed "You've Got a Friend" together in 2010 during their Troubadour Reunion Tour. In 2015, Taylor performed an acoustic rendition of the song at Hôtel de Ville, Paris, at the invitation of U.S. Secretary of State John Kerry and Paris mayor Anne Hidalgo in tribute to the victims of the January 2015 Île-de-France attacks. King performed the song at the 2021 Rock and Roll Hall of Fame Induction Ceremony.

== Reception ==
According to author James D. Perone, the song's themes include an expression of "a universal, sisterly/brotherly, agape-type love of one human being for another, regardless of gender." The "reassuring" lyrics have long made the song popular with lonely people needing a boost of self-confidence. The song's messages of friendship having no boundaries and a friend being there when you are in need have universal appeal. The lyrics had particular resonance for Taylor due to the depression he had recovered from shortly before hearing King play the song. The music moves between a major and minor key, which according to music critic Maury Dean gives it a "sympathetic mood".

In his review of Tapestry, Rolling Stone critic Jon Landau called "You've Got a Friend" King's "most perfect new song". He particularly praised how the melody and lyrics support each other and the "gorgeous, righteous rock melody" of the ending lyrics. Mojo called the song probably "the core of Tapestry". AllMusic critic Stewart Mason noted the "plainspoken intimacy" of King's performance, writing that the "shyness" of her voice gives her recording a sincerity that he finds Taylor's to lack. Mason also praises the "depth and shading" the string instruments provide on King's recording.

In his review of Mud Slide Slim and the Blue Horizon, Rolling Stone critic Ben Gerson called "You've Got a Friend" an "affirmative song" but suggested that Taylor's version was too similar to King's to have been worth including on his album. Music critic Maury Dean called Taylor's performance style on the song minimalist and folkish and noted his "star-spangled sincerity." Cash Box praised the "tasty material and Taylor's stunning interpretation". Record World said, "there's no way [Taylor] can miss with this gem."

== Charts (James Taylor single) ==
=== Weekly charts ===
Chart (1971)	Peak position
Argentina	16
Australia (Kent Music Report)	25
Canada Top Singles (RPM)	2
Canada Adult Contemporary (RPM)	12
Ireland (IRMA)	3
Netherlands (Dutch Top 40)	20
Netherlands (Single Top 100)	14
UK Singles (Official Charts)	4
US Adult Contemporary (Billboard)	1
US Billboard Hot 100	1
US Cash Box Top 100	1

=== Year-end charts ===
Chart (1971)	Rank
Canada Top Singles (RPM)	33
UK	32
US Billboard Hot 100	17
US Cash Box Top 100	27

== Certifications ==
=== Carole King version ===
Region	Certification	Certified units/sales
United States (RIAA)	Gold	500,000^{‡}
^{‡} Sales+streaming figures based on certification alone.

=== James Taylor version ===
Region	Certification	Certified units/sales
United Kingdom (BPI)	Silver	200,000^{‡}
United States (RIAA)	Gold	1,000,000^{^}
^{^} Shipments figures based on certification alone.^{‡} Sales+streaming figures based on certification alone.

== Personnel ==
=== Carole King version ===
- Carole King – piano, vocals
- James Taylor – acoustic guitar
- Danny "Kootch" Kortchmar – congas
- Charles Larkey – string bass
- Barry Socher – violin
- David Campbell – viola
- Terry King – cello

=== James Taylor version ===
- James Taylor – vocals, acoustic guitar
- Danny Kortchmar – acoustic guitar, congas
- Russ Kunkel – drums, congas, cabasa
- Leland Sklar – bass guitar
- Joni Mitchell – backing vocals

== Brand New Heavies version ==
"You've Got a Friend"

Single by the Brand New Heavies

from the album Shelter
- Released: October 6, 1997
- Genre: Acid jazz; house
- Length: 3:27
- Label: FFRR
- Songwriter: Carole King
- Producer: The Brand New Heavies

The Brand New Heavies singles chronology
"You Are the Universe" (1997)	"You've Got a Friend" (1997)	"Shelter" (1998)

Music video
- "You've Got a Friend" on YouTube

"You've Got a Friend" was covered by British acid jazz and funk group the Brand New Heavies for their fourth album, Shelter (1997), and released as the third single from the album in October 1997. It reached number nine on the UK Singles Chart and number 13 in Scotland in October 1997. The song also peaked within the top 10 in Hungary and was a top 30 hit on the Irish Singles Chart. The group performed the song on the music chart television program Top of the Pops.

=== Critical reception ===
Scottish Daily Record felt that here, "[the] London's soul funk band are back on form". A reviewer from Music Week gave it four out of five, declaring it as "a soulful cover", that "should have their usual specialist impact as well as crossover success." Alan Jones stated, "Recruiting Siedah Garrett has given the Brand New Heavies a new lease of life." Daisy & Havoc from the RM Dance Update named it "one of the best tracks on the recent BNH album (which either says something about their songwriting or our age), and now it appears with the compulsory remixes."

=== Track listings ===
CD single, UK and Europe (1997)

1. "You've Got a Friend" (radio version)
2. "You Are the Universe" (recorded live at The Forum)
3. "Midnight at the Oasis" (recorded live at The Forum)
4. "Sometimes" (recorded live at The Forum)

CD single, UK and Europe (1997)

1. "You've Got a Friend" (radio version) – 3:27
2. "You've Got a Friend" (Brooklyn Funk R&B mix) – 4:58
3. "You've Got a Friend" (Ballistic Brothers mix) – 5:00
4. "You've Got a Friend" (Brooklyn Funk club mix) – 4:54
5. "You've Got a Friend" (Tee's club mix) – 6:27
6. "You've Got a Friend" (original mix) – 3:48

=== Charts ===
Chart (1997)	Peak position
Europe (Eurochart Hot 100)	24
Germany (GfK)	77
Netherlands (Single Top 100)	79
Hungary (Mahasz)	7
Iceland (Íslenski Listinn Topp 40)	32
Ireland (IRMA)	25
Scottish Singles Sales (Official Charts)	13
UK Singles (Official Charts)	9

== McFly version ==
"You've Got a Friend"

Single by McFly

from the album Wonderland
- A-side: "All About You"
- B-side: "Room on the 3rd Floor"
- Released: March 7, 2005
- Length: 4:38
- Label: Island; Universal
- Songwriter: Carole King
- Producer: Hugh Padgham

McFly singles chronology
"Room on the 3rd Floor" (2004)	"All About You" / "You've Got a Friend" (2005)	"I'll Be OK" (2005)

In 2005, English pop rock band McFly released their version of the song as a double A-side single along with their original song "All About You". The band's first double A-side single, it was released on March 7, 2005, as the lead single from their second studio album, Wonderland (2005). The single was the official Comic Relief charity single for 2005, with all royalties being donated to the charity. The single was also used to promote Make Poverty History.

The single peaked at number one on the UK Singles Chart as well as in Ireland. Having sold over 536,000 copies in the UK, "All About You"/"You've Got a Friend" is McFly's best-selling single and received a platinum sales status certification from the British Phonographic Industry (BPI) for sales and streams exceeding 600,000 units.

=== Chart performance ===
The single debuted at number one on the UK Singles Chart, giving McFly their third UK number-one single, as well as their fifth top-five hit in less than a year. It debuted at number one, only to be knocked off the top spot the following week by the unofficial Comic Relief single "Is This the Way to Amarillo", by Tony Christie and (mimed by) Peter Kay.

=== Music video ===
The music video for "You've Got a Friend" was shot on location in Uganda. The band spent a week there in January 2005 for Comic Relief. The video sees McFly with the children of Uganda, playing with them, performing for them, and teaching them to sing. Towards the end of the video, McFly's vocals are removed for a chorus sung by the children.

=== Track listing ===
UK CD single

1. "All About You"
2. "You've Got a Friend"
3. "Room on the 3rd Floor"
4. "All About You" (orchestral version)
5. "All About You" (video)

=== Charts ===
==== Weekly charts ====
Chart (2005)	Peak position
Europe (European Hot 100)	2
Iceland (Íslenski listinn)	8
Ireland (IRMA)	1
Scottish Singles Sales (Official Charts)	1
UK Singles (Official Charts)	1

Chart (2010)	Peak position
South Korea (GAON)	64

==== Year-end charts ====
Chart (2005)	Position
UK Singles (OCC)	6

=== Certifications ===
Region	Certification	Certified units/sales
United Kingdom (BPI)	Platinum	536,000

== Other versions ==
Dusty Springfield recorded the song in early 1971 during the sessions for her third Atlantic Records album, Faithful. Her recording predates James Taylor's, but was shelved until 1999, when it was included as a bonus track on the 1999 Deluxe Edition of her first Atlantic album, Dusty in Memphis (which contains four Carole King compositions). Faithful went unreleased due to disputes between Springfield and Atlantic, but the sessions were issued as a standalone album in 2015.

The song (and two others from Tapestry: "Beautiful" and "Where You Lead") appear on Barbra Streisand's 1971 album Barbra Joan Streisand.

Johnny Mathis released an album with title track entitled You've Got a Friend in August 1971.

Lynn Anderson released a country version of the song on her 1971 studio album How Can I Unlove You.

The song was recorded by Roberta Flack and Donny Hathaway for their 1972 album Roberta Flack & Donny Hathaway and was released as the album's first single. The single was released a year before the album and, coincidentally, on the same date as Taylor's single, May 29, 1971. The Flack and Hathaway version reached No. 29 on the Billboard Hot 100 and No. 8 on the R&B chart.

Aretha Franklin recorded the song three times. The first and best-known was her 1972 live gospel performance Amazing Grace, as part of a medley with "Precious Lord, Take My Hand". She then recorded the song on Tapestry Revisited: A Tribute to Carole King in 1995 alongside BeBe & CeCe Winans, and in 2010 as a duet with Ronald Isley on his album Mr. I.

In 1973 or 1974, the Cambodian singer Pou Vannary covered the song with the lyrics translated into Khmer. Vannary's rendition is featured on the 2015 documentary film Don't Think I've Forgotten soundtrack.

The Israeli singer-songwriter Tzila Dagan recorded a Hebrew version of the song for her 1977 album Reunion with Carole King.

In 1988 the British group the Housemartins released a version on their compilation album Now That's What I Call Quite Good.

King, Celine Dion, Shania Twain, and Gloria Estefan performed "You've Got a Friend" at the VH1 Divas Live concert at the Beacon Theatre, New York, in 1998. It was released as a promotional single in selected countries, reaching number 74 on the Belgian Flanders Airplay Chart in December 1998.
