= Allabouthefunk =

Allaboutthefunk

Studio album by The Brand New Heavies
- Released: 18 October 2004
- Genre: Funk
- Length: 51:22
- Labels: TBNH; OneTwo; Edel
- Producers: Andrew Levy; Jan Kincaid; Mark Ralph; Nicole Russo; Simon Bartholomew

The Brand New Heavies chronology
We Won't Stop (2003)	Allaboutthefunk (2004)	Get Used to It (2006)

Singles from Allabouthefunk
- 1. "Boogie" Released: 11 October 2004; 2. "Surrender" Released: 14 March 2005

Professional ratings
Review scores
Source	Rating
AllMusic	2.5/5 stars

All About the Funk (stylised as Allabouthefunk) is a funk album released by the Brand New Heavies. After their most identifiable lead singer N'Dea Davenport left the band to pursue a solo career in the mid-1990s, the band rotated in several African-American singer/songwriters Siedah Garrett, Carleen Anderson, and Sy Smith as lead vocalists on previous projects. This independent follow-up release features British singer Nicole Russo on vocals for the entire project. The band covers Jimmy Cliff's "Many Rivers to Cross", as well as covering their own "What Do You Take Me For", which previously featured N'Dea Davenport on their 2003 album We Won't Stop.

Though Allabouthefunk was initially only released to UK and international territories, it is now available in the United States as a digital download.

== Track listing ==
Standard CD
No.	Title	Writer(s)	Length
1.	"Boogie"		3:52
2.	"Need Some More"		3:58
3.	"Waste My Time"		3:30
4.	"Keep On Shining"		4:21
5.	"What Do You Take Me For"		4:35
6.	"Surrender"		3:48
7.	"Many Rivers to Cross"	Jimmy Cliff	3:32
8.	"How Do You Think"	Eg White	3:49
9.	"It Could Be Me"		4:36
10.	"I Feel Right"		5:56
11.	"How We Do This"		5:55
Total length:			51:22

UK/Japanese bonus tracks
No.	Title	Length
13.	"Boogie" (Blacksmith R&B Rub 12")	4:45
14.	"Boogie" (The Andrew Love Levy Mix)	6:31

== Personnel ==
The Brand New Heavies

- Simon Bartholomew – guitar
- Jan Kincaid – drums, vocals
- Nicole Russo – vocals
- Andrew Levy – bass

== Charts ==
Chart performance for Allaboutthefunk
Chart (2004)	Peak position
French Albums (SNEP)	138
Swiss Albums (Schweizer Hitparade)	81
UK Albums (OCC)	122
