= Shelter (Brand New Heavies album) =

Studio album by The Brand New Heavies
- Released: 21 April 1997
- Genre: Acid jazz; funk
- Length: 57:55 (standard version)
- Label: Delicious Vinyl
- Producer: The Brand New Heavies

The Brand New Heavies chronology
Brother Sister (1994)	Shelter (1997)	Trunk Funk – The Best of The Brand New Heavies (2000)

Singles from Shelter
- 1. "Sometimes" Released: 31 March 1997; 2. "You Are the Universe" Released: 16 June 1997; 3. "You've Got a Friend" Released: 6 October 1997; 4. "Shelter" Released: 29 December 1997

Professional ratings
Review scores
Source	Rating
AllMusic	3/5 stars
Music Week	4/5 stars
Muzik	9/10
NME	7/10
People Magazine	(favorable)

Shelter is an album by The Brand New Heavies, released in 1997 on the Delicious Vinyl record label. It is the only album by the Brand New Heavies to feature singer-songwriter Siedah Garrett as a member of the band, joining them in 1996 and leaving in early 1998 to concentrate on her own songwriting.

== Single releases ==
With Garrett as part of the Brand New Heavies they enjoyed their only UK top 10 hit with a cover of the Carole King-penned song "You've Got a Friend", originally made famous by James Taylor. It reached number 9 when released as the third single from the album. Their cover did not appear on initial pressings of the US version of Shelter but was added to later pressings after the band's record label Delicious Vinyl secured distribution from Bertelsmann Music Group.

The album also contains the hit "Sometimes", which peaked at number 11 on the UK Singles Chart when released in 1997. One of the remixes of "Sometimes" featured the rap vocals of Q-Tip from A Tribe Called Quest. In 2015, production team Jimmy Jam and Terry Lewis revealed that the remix done by J Dilla which featured Q-Tip was the inspiration behind the sound of Janet Jackson's 1997 single "Got 'til It's Gone".

"You Are the Universe" and "Shelter" were the other singles from the album, reaching numbers 21 and 31 respectively in the UK Singles Chart.

== Track listing ==
Standard CD Version
No.	Title	Length
1.	"I Like It"	3:37
2.	"Sometimes"	4:00
3.	"Shelter"	5:02
4.	"You Are the Universe"	4:11
5.	"Crying Water"	4:17
6.	"Day by Day"	4:42
7.	"Feels Like Right"	4:21
8.	"Highest High"	4:28
9.	"Stay Gone"	4:56
10.	"You've Got a Friend" (Carole King)	3:09
11.	"Once Is Twice Enough"	3:59
12.	"After Forever"	5:23
13.	"Last to Know"	4:25

US CD Version
No.	Title	Length
1.	"I Like It"	3:37
2.	"Sometimes"	4:00
3.	"Shelter"	5:02
4.	"You Are the Universe"	4:11
5.	"Crying Water"	4:17
6.	"Day by Day"	4:42
7.	"Feels Like Right"	4:21
8.	"Highest High"	4:28
9.	"Stay Gone"	4:56
10.	"Once Is Twice Enough"	3:59
11.	"You Can Do It"	4:02
12.	"After Forever"	5:23
13.	"Last to Know"	4:25

Japan CD Version
No.	Title	Length
1.	"I Like It"	3:37
2.	"Sometimes"	4:00
3.	"Shelter"	5:02
4.	"You Are the Universe"	4:11
5.	"Crying Water"	4:17
6.	"Day by Day"	4:42
7.	"Feels Like Right"	4:21
8.	"Highest High"	4:28
9.	"Stay Gone"	4:56
10.	"Once Is Twice Enough"	3:59
11.	"After Forever"	5:23
12.	"Last to Know"	4:25
13.	"Never Gonna Let You Down"	4:47
14.	"Movin' On"	5:12

== Personnel ==
The Brand New Heavies

- Simon Bartholomew - Guitar
- Siedah Garrett – Vocals
- Jan Kincaid - Drums
- Andrew Levy - Bass

== Charts ==
Chart (1997)	Peak position
Australian Albums Chart	20
Dutch Albums Chart	41
French Albums Chart	39
German Albums Chart	55
Swedish Albums Chart	23
Swiss Albums Chart	38
UK Albums Chart	5
US Billboard 200	118
US Top R&B/Hip-Hop Albums	29

== Certifications ==
Region	Certification	Certified units/sales
United Kingdom (BPI)	Platinum	300,000^{^}
^{^} Shipments figures based on certification alone.
