= Get Used to It (Brand New Heavies album) =

Get Used To It

Studio album by The Brand New Heavies
- Released: 27 June 2006
- Genre: Funk
- Length: 50:43
- Label: Delicious Vinyl
- Producer: Michael C. Ross

The Brand New Heavies chronology
Allabouthefunk (2004)	Get Used To It (2006)	Live in London (2009)

Singles from Get Used To It
- 1. "I Don't Know Why (I Love You)" Released: 24 October 2006; 2. "Let's Do It Again" Released: 4 September 2007

Get Used To It: The Tom Moulton Mixes

Professional ratings
Review scores
Source	Rating
AllMusic	4/5 stars

Get Used to It is a funk album by the Brand New Heavies released 27 June 2006 via Starbucks and more traditional music retail outlets.

== Background ==
Get Used to It is the first album with lead singer N'Dea Davenport since she departed the band after the release of their 1994 album Brother Sister for a solo career. Following the band's reunion with Davenport. They also reunited with their former record label Delicious Vinyl. The album was recorded in New York and London. In early May, they released the lead single "I Don't Know Why (I Love You)," a cover of the Stevie Wonder song that was the B-side to his 1968 hit single "My Cherie Amour." The band toured at the end of 2006.

=== Tom Moulton mixes ===
"I Don't Know Why (I Love You)" was notable for being one of very few late releases to feature the trademarked A Tom Moulton Mix, as the legendary disco pioneer had been asked to contribute mixes. Impressed with the Heavies, the pioneering engineer eventually took on the task of remixing the entire Get Used To It. Unfortunately, the album's original mix was already finished and on its way to press. The new mixes were eventually re-released as Get Used To It: The Tom Moulton Mixes with a new cover featuring only Moulton's image. The digital re-release also made available instrumental mixes of each Tom Moulton mix.

== Track listing ==
Standard CD track listing
No.	Title	Writer(s)	Length
1.	"We've Got"	(Simon Bartholomew/N'Dea Davenport/Jan Kincaid/Andrew Levy)	4:43
2.	"I Don't Know Why (I Love You)"	(S. Wonder, P. Riser, D. Hunter, L. Hardaway)	3:31
3.	"Get Used To It"	(S. Bartholomew/N. Davenport/J. Kincaid/A. Levy)	3:26
4.	"Sex God"	(S. Bartholomew/N. Davenport/A. Levy)	4:54
5.	"Let's Do It Again"	(S. Bartholomew/N. Davenport/J. Kincaid/A. Levy)	5:08
6.	"We Won't Stop"	(S. Bartholomew/N. Davenport/A. Levy)	4:08
7.	"Right On"	(S. Bartholomew/N. Davenport/J. Kincaid/A. Levy)	4:05
8.	"Music"	(S. Bartholomew/J. Kincaid/A. Levy/Sy Smith)	3:35
9.	"I Just Realized"	(J. Kincaid/Jaz Rogers)	4:33
10.	"All Fired Up"	(S. Bartholomew/J. Kincaid/A. Levy)	4:12
11.	"Love Is"	(S. Bartholomew/J. Kincaid/A. Levy/Rudolph Riperton)	4:15
12.	"I've Been Touched"	(S. Bartholomew/N. Davenport/A. Levy/J. Rogers)	4:11
Total length:			50:49

Japan & Philippines CD Bonus Tracks
No.	Title	Length
13.	"50 Quid"	4:28
14.	"I Don't Know Why (I Love You)" (4Hero Electric Soul Mix)	5:00
15.	"I Don't Know Why (I Love You)" (Kenny Dope Mix)	7:31

== Personnel ==
The Brand New Heavies

- N'Dea Davenport – vocals, drums (4)
- Simon Bartholomew – guitar, background vocals
- Andrew Levy – bass guitar, programming, background vocals
- Jan Kincaid – percussion, drums, keyboards, vocals, background vocals

Additional Musicians

- Neal Evans – clavinet
- Anna Giddey – violin
- Dominic Glover – trumpet
- James A. Hunt – saxophone
- Ari Raskin – guitar
- Katherine Shave – viola
- Sy Smith – background vocals
- Nichol Thompson – trombone
- Lucy Wilkins – violin, leader
- Chris Worsey – cello

Technical personnel

- Gilbert Fuentes – engineer
- Mike Makowski – engineer
- Andy Marcinkowski – assistant
- Ari Raskin – engineer, mixing
- Mike Pelanconi – engineer, drum engineering
- Mark Ralph – programming, engineer, mixing
- Michael C. Ross – producer, executive producer, mixing
- Howie Weinberg – mastering

Additional personnel

- Dina Juntila – photography & art conception
