= Live in London (Brand New Heavies album) =

Live album by The Brand New Heavies
- Released: October 2009
- Recorded: October 16, 2008
- Venue: indigo at The O2 (London)
- Genre: Funk
- Length: 110:05
- Label: Delicious Vinyl

The Brand New Heavies chronology
Get Used to It (2006)	Live in London (2009)

Live in London is a live album by the Brand New Heavies released in October 2009.

It was rated three and a half stars by AllMusic, which noted, "The album makes a good souvenir of a veteran band playing most of its best-known material to its most faithful fans."

== Track listing ==
CD 1

1. "Intro" (This track later became the title track of their next studio album released in 2013, Forward)
2. "People Get Ready"
3. "BNH"
4. "All Fired Up" (S. Bartholomew/J. Kincaid/A. Levy)
5. "Never Stop"
6. "Dream On Dreamer" (N. Davenport/D. Austin)
7. "Midnight at the Oasis" (D. Nichtern)
8. "Sometimes"
9. "Back to Love"
10. "Sex God" (S. Bartholomew/N. Davenport/A. Levy)
11. "I Don't Know Why (I Love You)" (S. Wonder)
12. "Ride in the Sky"
13. "Day Break"

CD 2

1. "Brother Sister"
2. "Jump and Move"
3. "Let's Do It Again" (S. Bartholomew/N. Davenport/J. Kincaid/A. Levy)
4. "Spend Some Time" (A. Levy/A. Cheung)
5. "You Are the Universe"
6. "Forever"
7. "Stay This Way"
8. "Dream Come True"

== Personnel ==
The Brand New Heavies

- Jan Kincaid – vocals & drums
- N'Dea Davenport – vocals
- Simon Bartholomew – guitar & background vocals
- Andrew Love Levy – bass guitar & background vocals
- Hazel Fernandes – background vocals

Musicians

- Finn Peters – saxophone
- Dominic Glover – trumpet
- Nichol Thomson – trombone
- Matt Steele – keyboards
- Lascelles Gordon – percussion

Technical Personnel

- Matt Kemp – audio mixer
- Paul Nickson – audio mixer
- Will Shapland – audio mixer
- The Brand New Heavies – editor
- Will Shapland – engineering

Additional Personnel

- Andrew Love Levy – photographer
- The Brand New Heavies – additional photography
