= Don't Let It Go to Your Head (Jean Carn song) =

1978 song performed by Jean Carn

Single by Jean Carn

from the album Happy to Be with You
- Released: 1978
- Length: 4:52 (album version)
- Label: Philadelphia International
- Songwriters: Kenneth Gamble; Leon Huff
- Producers: Gamble & Huff

"Don't Let It Go to Your Head" is a song by American singer Jean Carn. It has spawned multiple cover versions.

== Brand New Heavies version ==
"Don't Let It Go to Your Head"

Single by the Brand New Heavies featuring N'Dea Davenport

from the album The Brand New Heavies
- Released: 1992
- Genre: Acid jazz; funk
- Length: 3:28
- Label: FFRR
- Songwriters: Kenneth Gamble; Leon Huff
- Producer: The Brand New Heavies

The Brand New Heavies singles chronology
"Never Stop" (1991)	"Don't Let It Go to Your Head" (1992)	"Dream On Dreamer" (1994)

Music video
- "Don't Let It Go to Your Head" on YouTube

English band the Brand New Heavies released their cover of "Don't Let It Go to Your Head" in 1992 as the fifth and last single from their first album, The Brand New Heavies (1990). It peaked at number 24 on the UK Singles Chart, as well as numbers one and 16 on the UK Dance Singles chart and the UK Club Chart.

=== Charts ===
Chart (1992)	Peak position
Australia (ARIA)	195
Europe (European Dance Radio)	9
UK Singles (Official Charts)	24
UK Airplay (Music Week)	32
UK Dance (Music Week)	1
UK Club Chart (Music Week)	16

== Brand Nubian sample ==
Brand Nubian sampled it for their second single, also titled "Don't Let It Go to Your Head", from their album Foundation. This version charted at number 3 on the Hot Rap Singles chart, number 24 on the Hot R&B/Hip-Hop Singles & Tracks chart, and crossed over to the Billboard Hot 100, peaking at number 54.

== Other covers ==
The 1979 Reggae/Lovers Rock version by British - Jamaican group Black Harmony was featured as part of the Grand Theft Auto: San Andreas soundtrack. This cover is also included on the popular compilation "Hustle! Reggae Disco" released in 2002 on Soul Jazz Records (SJR66)

Fat Larry's Band also released a cover version in 1983.
