= Never Stop (Brand New Heavies song) =

1991 single by the Brand New Heavies

Single by the Brand New Heavies featuring N'Dea Davenport

from the album The Brand New Heavies (re-release)
- Released: 23 September 1991
- Genre: Acid jazz; funk
- Length: 3:39
- Label: FFRR

The Brand New Heavies singles chronology
| "Dream Come True" (Brand New Mix) (1990) | "Never Stop" (1991) | "Stay This Way" (1991) |

Music video
- "Never Stop" on YouTube

"Never Stop" is a song by the English band the Brand New Heavies, included on the 1991 re-release of their eponymous debut studio album. A remixed version by David Morales featuring vocals by N'Dea Davenport was released as the third single from the album on 23 September 1991 by FFRR. The accompanying music video was directed by Douglas Gayeton and received heavy rotation on MTV.

The song's drum beat was sampled in George Michael's 1992 hit single, "Too Funky".

== Track listing ==
- 7-inch single, UK (1991)

A. "Never Stop"
B1. "Never Stop" (extended mix)
B2. "Never Stop" (Kincaid mix)

- 12-inch vinyl, US (1991)

A1. "Never Stop" (extended remix) – 6:53
A2. "Never Stop" (dub remix) – 5:20
A3. "Never Stop" (instrumental) – 5:32
A4. "Never Stop" (single edit remix) – 3:55
B1. "Never Stop" (extended version) – 5:38
B2. "Never Stop" (Heavy Beats mix) – 5:41
B3. "Never Stop" (single edit) – 4:03

- CD maxi single – David Morales mixes
1. "Never Stop" (single radio edit) – 3:39
2. "Never Stop" (Morales extended mix) – 6:49
3. "Never Stop" (Heavies extended mix) – 5:39
4. "Never Stop" (Kincaid mix) – 3:51

== Charts ==
Chart performance for "Never Stop"
| Chart (1991–1992) | Peak position |
|---|---|
| Australia (ARIA) | 140 |
| UK Singles (OCC) | 43 |
| UK Airplay (Music Week) | 23 |
| UK Dance (Music Week) | 2 |
| UK Club Chart (Music Week) | 19 |
| US Billboard Hot 100 | 54 |
| US Hot R&B Singles (Billboard) | 3 |
