= The Brand New Heavies (album) =

Studio album by The Brand New Heavies
- Released: 16 April 1990
- Recorded: 1989–1990
- Genre: Acid jazz
- Label: Acid Jazz Records; Delicious Vinyl Records; FFRR

The Brand New Heavies chronology
The Brand New Heavies (1990)	Heavy Rhyme Experience, Vol. 1 (1992)

Alternative cover
- North American cover

Alternative cover
- 1992 cover

Singles from The Brand New Heavies
- 1. "People Get Ready" Released: 1989; 2. "Dream Come True" Released: 13 August 1990; 3. "Never Stop" Released: 23 September 1991; 4. "Dream Come True '92" Released: 3 February 1992; 5. "Don't Let It Go to Your Head" Released: 20 July 1992; 6. "Stay this Way '92" Released: 30 November 1992

The Brand New Heavies is the debut album by British acid jazz group The Brand New Heavies. The album was originally released on 16 April 1990 on Acid Jazz Records. The album was reissued in 1991, featuring vocals by new group member N'Dea Davenport.

Following the reissue, the album became more successful than its original release, debuting on the UK Albums Chart at number twenty-five and earning a silver-certification by the British Phonographic Industry (BPI). The album spawned six singles: "People Get Ready", "Dream Come True", "Never Stop", "Dream Come True '92", "Don't Let It Go to Your Head", and "Stay this Way '92"; the latter three of which peaked in the Top 40 on the UK Singles Chart.

== Release and promotion ==
On 16 April 1990, The Brand New Heavies was released exclusively in the United Kingdom on Acid Jazz Records. Shortly after the release of the album, the group's lead vocalist Jaye Ella Ruth departed from the group and was replaced with American singer N'Dea Davenport. In March 1991, the group reissued the album in North America on Delicious Vinyl Records. The North American version featured an additional song titled "Never Stop". To promote the album, The Brand New Heavies appeared on various television shows from 1991 until late 1992. On 19 October 1991, The Brand New Heavies performed "Stay this Way" on American musical variety television show Soul Train. On November 9, 1991, the group performed "Never Stop" and "Stay this Way" on Showtime at the Apollo.

On 20 February 1992, the group performed "Dream Come True" on British music chart television programme Top of the Pops. On 2 March 1992, The Brand New Heavies was released internationally on Full Frequency Range Recordings (FFRR). The international version omitted the song "Shake Down" and included two new songs: "Got to Give" and a cover version of "Don't Let It Go to Your Head". An expanded edition of the album was released on BGP Records in 2007.

== Singles ==
In 1989, The Brand New Heavies released the single "People Get Ready", which failed to chart. "Dream Come True" was released as the album's second single on 13 August 1990. The song peaked at number sixty-three on the US Hot R&B Singles chart.

"Never Stop" was released as the first international single and third overall single from The Brand New Heavies on 23 September 1991. A commercial success, it peaked at number forty-three on the UK Singles Chart. The song became their first crossover hit, peaking at number fifty-four on the US Billboard Hot 100 and number four on the US Hot R&B Singles chart. The accompanying music video for "Never Stop" was directed by Douglas Gayeton.

"Dream Come True" was reissued with vocals by N'Dea Davenport and released as the second international single and fourth overall single on 3 February 1992. The song peaked at number twenty-four on the UK Singles Chart and number forty-two on the US Hot R&B Singles. "Don't Let It Go to Your Head", a cover version of Jean Carn's song, was released as the fifth single on 20 July 1992, peaking at number twenty-four on the UK Singles Chart. "Stay this Way" was released as the sixth and final single from the album on 30 November 1992. The song peaked at number forty on the UK Singles Chart and number nineteen on the US Hot R&B Singles.

== Critical reception ==
Professional ratings
Review scores
Source	Rating
AllMusic	4.5/5 stars
Chicago Tribune	2.5/4 stars
Entertainment Weekly	(favorable)
Select	3/5

AllMusic's Alex Henderson gave The Brand New Heavies a favourable review. He praised the album for its use of live instrumentation instead of synth instruments. Henderson commented, "Real horns -- not synthesizers made to sound like horns -- enrich those gems as well as the sweaty vocal funk of "People Get Ready" and "Put the Funk Back in It" and the jazz-influenced instrumental "BNH." Henderson also complimented group member N'Dea Davenport for her performance on "Stay this Way" and "Dream Come True". Marisa Fox of Entertainment Weekly rated the album two and a half stars out of four.

== Commercial performance ==
The Brand New Heavies debuted at number twenty-five on the UK Albums Chart on 14 March 1992. The album spent eighteen weeks on the chart, gradually falling back to number fifty-eight before dropping off the chart. On 1 January 1993, the album received a silver-certification by the British Phonographic Industry (BPI). In the United States, the album peaked at number seventeen on the US Billboard Top R&B Albums chart.

== Track listing ==
Original release
No.	Title	Vocalist	Length
1.	"BNH"		5:55
2.	"Gimmie One of Those"		3:43
3.	"Dream Come True"	Jay Ella Ruth	4:53
4.	"Put the Funk Back in It"		3:26
5.	"People Get Ready"		3:47
6.	"Ride in the Sky"	Jay Ella Ruth	3:20
7.	"Sphynx"		6:14
8.	"Stay This Way"	Jay Ella Ruth	4:14
9.	"Shake Down"		4:20

Deluxe edition 2007
No.	Title	Length
10.	"Never Stop (featuring N'Dea Davenport)"	4:11
11.	"Rest of Me"	4:22
12.	"Reality"	3:54
13.	"Mother's Tongue"	4:35
14.	"A Day at the Seaside"	3:36
15.	"Country Funkin'"	4:45
16.	"Never Stop (Jan Kincaid Version)"	4:44
17.	"Dream Come True" (Original 1988 Version)	5:22

International edition 1991
No.	Title	Vocalist	Length
1.	"BNH"		5:55
2.	"Dream Come True"	N'Dea Davenport	4:53
3.	"People Get Ready"	N'Dea Davenport	3:47
4.	"Never Stop"	N'Dea Davenport	4:13
5.	"Put the Funk Back in It"		3:19
6.	"Gimme One of Those"		3:42
7.	"Ride in the Sky"	N'Dea Davenport	3:24
8.	"Sphynx"		4:47
9.	"Stay This Way"	N'Dea Davenport	5:43
10.	"Shake Down"		4:19

Re-release international edition 1992
No.	Title	Vocalist	Length
1.	"Dream Come True"	N'Dea Davenport	7:47
2.	"Stay This Way" (The Heavy 7")	N'Dea Davenport	4:10
3.	"People Get Ready"	N'Dea Davenport	3:47
4.	"Never Stop" (Morales Remix Single Edit)	N'Dea Davenport	3:55
5.	"Put the Funk Back in It"		3:20
6.	"Don't Let It Go to Your Head"	N'Dea Davenport	3:49
7.	"B.N.H."		4:28
8.	"Ride in the Sky"	N'Dea Davenport	3:43
9.	"Gimme One of Those"		3:43
10.	"Sphynx"		6:11
11.	"Got to Give"	N'Dea Davenport, Jan Kincaid	4:26

== Personnel ==
The Brand New Heavies

- Simon Bartholomew – guitar, vocals
- N'Dea Davenport (1991) – vocals
- Lascelles Gordon (1991) – percussion, guitar
- Jan Kincaid – drums, keyboards
- Jaye Ella Ruth (1990) – vocals
- Andrew Levy – bass, keyboards, writer & producer
- Jim Wellman (1991) – tenor saxophone, soprano saxophone, keyboards

== Charts ==
Chart performance for The Brand New Heavies
Chart (1992)	Peak position
Australian Albums (ARIA)	139
UK Albums (OCC)	25
US Top R&B/Hip-Hop Albums (Billboard)	17

== Certifications ==
Region	Certification	Certified units/sales
United Kingdom (BPI)	Silver	60,000^{^}
^{^} Shipments figures based on certification alone.
