= Sometimes (Brand New Heavies song) =

1997 single by the Brand New Heavies

Single by the Brand New Heavies

from the album Shelter
- Released: 26 March 1997
- Genre: Funk; soul
- Length: 4:04
- Label: FFRR
- Songwriters: Jan Kincaid; Siedah Garrett
- Producer: The Brand New Heavies

The Brand New Heavies singles chronology
"Midnight at the Oasis" (1994)	"Sometimes" (1997)	"You Are the Universe" (1997)

Music video
- "Sometimes" on YouTube

"Sometimes" is a song by British acid jazz group the Brand New Heavies, released in March 1997 by FFRR Records as the lead single from their fourth album, Shelter (1997). The lead vocals are performed by American singer Siedah Garrett, who also co-wrote it. The song charted at number 11 in the United Kingdom and number 88 in the United States. The accompanying music video is a spoof of US TV-shows like Playboy's Penthouse and Playboy After Dark, and shows the band with Garrett performing at one of these TV-shows. It also features some small clips of Playboy magnate Hugh Hefner.

== Critical reception ==
Larry Flick from Billboard magazine named the song "a slinky sliver of soul that demands the immediate attention". He also complimented Garrett's performance and commented that "besides offering a performance that will give jeep kiddies a swift kick in the pants, she can craft solid hooks that add dimension to the band's acclaimed knack for weaving body-invading funk rhythms." Dominic Pride from Music & Media described it as "hooky" and "refreshingly downbeat". Music Week gave "Sometimes" a score of four out of five, declaring it as "laid down soul funk from the band that helped create the term acid jazz." The reviewer added, "Now with Siedah Garrett on vocals, they sound as if they're back to form." Ezra Gale of Salon opined that it "starts out with a promising bass and drums vamp, [and] instead turns into an overblown sing-along by the time it reaches the first chorus."

== Track listings ==
- 12-inch single, Italy (1997)
1. "Sometimes" (Brixton radio 12-inch mix)
2. "Sometimes" (Brixton rap mix)
3. "Sometimes" (Ditti's French Touch)
- CD single, UK and Europe (1997)
1. "Sometimes" (radio edit) – 4:04
2. "Sometimes" (MAW Smooth mix) – 7:28
3. "Sometimes" (Ummah remix) – 4:31
4. "Sometimes" (Nuyoricans Meet the Heavies) – 5:13
- CD single, US (1997)
1. "Sometimes" (radio edit) – 4:15
2. "Sometimes" (The Ummah remix) – 4:30

== Charts ==
=== Weekly charts ===
Chart (1997)	Peak position
Canada Top Singles (RPM)	71
Estonia (Eesti Top 20)	3
Europe (Eurochart Hot 100)	40
France Airplay (SNEP)	52
Iceland (Íslenski Listinn Topp 40)	20
Netherlands (Dutch Top 40 Tipparade)	19
Netherlands (Single Top 100)	83
Scottish Singles Sales (Official Charts)	16
Sweden (Sverigetopplistan)	57
Switzerland (Schweizer Hitparade)	40
UK Singles (Official Charts)	11
UK Hip Hop/R&B (Official Charts)	3
US Billboard Hot 100	88
US Hot R&B Singles (Billboard)	20

=== Year-end charts ===
Chart (1997)	Position
UK Singles (OCC)	199
UK Club Chart (Music Week)	42

== Certifications ==
Region	Certification	Certified units/sales
United Kingdom (BPI)	Silver	200,000^{^}
^{^} Shipments figures based on certification alone.

== Release history ==
Region	Date	Format(s)	Label(s)	Ref.
Japan	26 March 1997	CD	FFRR	
United Kingdom	31 March 1997	CD; cassette	FFRR	
United States	1 April 1997	Rhythmic contemporary radio	Delicious Vinyl; Red Ant Entertainment	
United States	15 April 1997	Contemporary hit radio	Delicious Vinyl; Red Ant Entertainment	
