= Brother Sister =

Album by Brand New Heavies

Studio album by The Brand New Heavies
- Released: 4 April 1994
- Recorded: 1993–94
- Genre: Acid jazz; funk
- Length: 58:07
- Label: Delicious Vinyl

The Brand New Heavies chronology
Heavy Rhyme Experience, Vol. 1 (1992)	Brother Sister (1994)	Shelter (1997)

Alternative cover
- UK/International cover

Singles from Brother Sister
- 1. "Dream On Dreamer" Released: 14 March 1994; 2. "Back to Love (UK only)" Released: 23 May 1994; 3. "Midnight at the Oasis (UK only)" Released: 25 July 1994; 4. "Spend Some Time" Released: 17 October 1994

Professional ratings
Initial reviews (in 1994)
Review scores
Source	Rating
Billboard	(favorable)
Entertainment Weekly	B−
Gavin Report	(favorable)
The Guardian	(favorable)
Knoxville News Sentinel	3/5 stars
Music & Media	(favorable)
Music Week	3/5 stars
NME	7/10
Orlando Sentinel	4/5 stars
Select	2/5 medals

Professional ratings
Retrospective reviews (after 1994)
Review scores
Source	Rating
AllMusic	3/5 stars

Brother Sister is an album by British acid jazz and funk group the Brand New Heavies, released on March 22, 1994, by Delicious Vinyl. It spawned several singles, including "Spend Some Time" which spent two weeks at number two on the American dance charts. A cover of Maria Muldaur's "Midnight at the Oasis" became popular in the UK, but was not included in the US version of the album.

Brother Sister was lead singer N'Dea Davenport's last album with the Brand New Heavies before leaving to complete her solo album (which she had put on hold to join the Heavies). She returned to join the band ten years later.

== Critical reception ==
The album received positive reviews from music critics. Larry Flick from Billboard wrote, "One of the absolute best albums we have heard in a real long time is Brother Sister by Brand New Heavies. Coming March 8 to a store near you on Delicious Vinyl/EastWest, the set weaves traditional jazz threads into a warm fabric of club-colored funk and R&B patterns. N'Dea Davenport is back in the house, putting her golden alto range to excellent use on sparklers like 'Dream On Dreamer', which has just been nicely retouched by The Angel, Dallas Austin, and David Morales. Gorgeous."

Pan-European magazine Music & Media commented, "Still punch drunk from the single 'Dream On Dreamer', the heavy weights of acid jazz hit you knock out with this 15-track album. It can be divided into three rounds--a strong opening and end with some shadow boxing inbetween. In "round 1" N'Dea Davenport powerlifts the title track with its electric piano to the level of '70s jazz funk outfit Deodato. When it really comes to hard hitting, in "round 3," she "kills" the 'Fake' opponent with a swing not heard from the UK since the heyday of the Average White Band."

Alan Jones from Music Week gave it three out of five, saying, "The Heavies turn in a professional but rather tepid album, and will probably have only a brief period of chart success, though their potential remains undimmed." Ian McCann from NME gave the album seven out of ten, writing, "Brother Sister is a fine album, as far as it goes. The upbeat vibe they're noted for floods out from the opening tune, 'Have a Good Time', a cool, chiefly instrumental groove, heavy on Maceo Parkerish sax. [...] If you're soulfully inclined, play Brother Sister on sunlit mornings as you walk to the dole office and it'll make perfect sense."

== Track listing ==
US release
No.	Title	Length
1.	"Have a Good Time"	3:12
2.	"Brother Sister"	4:46
3.	"Dream On Dreamer" (edit)	4:00
4.	"Ten Ton Take"	3:28
5.	"Mind Trips"	5:48
6.	"Fake"	4:34
7.	"Spend Some Time"	4:24
8.	"Los Burritos" (US only)	1:09
9.	"Back to Love"	4:38
10.	"Snake Hips"	2:03
11.	"Keep Together"	4:22
12.	"People Giving Love"	5:05
13.	"Forever"	5:10
14.	"Day Break"	5:25

UK/International release
No.	Title	Length
1.	"Have a Good Time"	3:12
2.	"Brother Sister"	4:46
3.	"Dream On Dreamer"	4:53
4.	"Midnight at the Oasis" (UK only)	4:05
5.	"Back to Love"	4:49
6.	"Ten Ton Take"	3:28
7.	"Mind Trips"	5:47
8.	"Spend Some Time"	4:24
9.	"Keep Together"	4:21
10.	"Snake Hips"	2:04
11.	"Fake"	4:34
12.	"People Giving Love"	5:06
13.	"Worlds Keep Spinning" (UK only)	5:08
14.	"Forever"	5:32
15.	"Day Break"	5:25

== Personnel ==
The Brand New Heavies

- N'Dea Davenport – lead and backing vocals, keyboards, percussion
- Simon Bartholomew – guitar, backing vocals, percussion
- Andrew Levy – bass, backing vocals, keyboards, percussion, string arrangements
- Jan Kincaid – drums, backing and lead vocals, percussion, keyboards

Musicians

- Maxton G. Beesley, Jr. – keyboards
- Brady Blade, Jr. – vocals (background), production coordination
- Mike Boito – keyboards, vocals (background)
- The Brand New Heavies – percussion, producer, engineer, art direction, mixing
- Amp Fiddler – keyboards
- Ray Gaskins – saxophone, vocals (background)
- John Thirkell - trumpet, flugelhorn (Solo on "Dream on Dreamer")
- Gerard Presencer – trumpet, flugelhorn
- Kevin Robinson – trumpet
- Dennis Rollins – trombone, trombone (Tenor)
- Eric Sarafin – strings, engineer, mixing
- Jeff Scantlebury – percussion
- Mike Smith – flute, saxophone
- Steve Williamson – saxophone
- Aaron Zigman – string arrangements

=== Production ===
- Matthew Donaldson – photography
- Brian Gardner – mastering
- Chris Jones – engineer
- John Laker – engineer
- Michael C. Ross – executive producer, mixing
- Martin Schmelze – engineer
- Yo-Yo – engineer

== Charts ==
Chart performance for Brother Sister
Chart (1994)	Peak position
Australian Albums (ARIA)	20
Dutch Albums (Album Top 100)	67
German Albums (Offizielle Top 100)	86
Japanese Albums (Oricon)	45
Scottish Albums (OCC)	17
Swedish Albums (Sverigetopplistan)	31
Swiss Albums (Schweizer Hitparade)	23
UK Albums (OCC)	4
UK R&B Albums (OCC)	2
US Billboard 200	95
US Top R&B/Hip-Hop Albums (Billboard)	26

== Certifications ==
Region	Certification	Certified units/sales
United Kingdom (BPI)	Platinum	300,000^{^}
^{^} Shipments figures based on certification alone.

== Remix album ==
Excursions: Remixes & Rare Grooves

Remix album by The Brand New Heavies
- Released: 1995
- Genre: funk, hip-hop, R&B
- Label: Delicious Vinyl

Singles from Excursions: Remixes & Rare Grooves
- 1. "Close to You (UK only)" Released: 27 February 1995; 2. "Mind Trips (US only)" Released: 7 November 1995

Excursions: Remixes & Rare Grooves was released in the United States by Delicious Vinyl Records. This album functions as a component to the US release of Brother Sister. Its cover art mimics the UK release of Brother Sister. Among its tracks are the two bonus tracks from the UK version of the album that were unavailable stateside. The UK hit "Close To You" was previously only available on the Prêt-à-Porter motion picture soundtrack. "Bang" and "O-Fa-Fu" were a pair of B-side instrumentals from the UK CD-single of "Stay This Way" in 1992. "Keep It Coming" is an extended version of a Jan Kincaid-penned B-side on The Heavies' "Don't Let It Go to Your Head" single.

=== Track listing ===
Excursions: Remixes & Rare Grooves
No.	Title	Previous Release	Length
1.	"Mind Trips" (BNH Remix)		4:58
2.	"Bang"	"Stay This Way" UK single	3:55
3.	"Brother Sister" (The Angel Remix)		5:04
4.	"Close to You"	Prêt-à-Porter soundtrack	4:08
5.	"Dream On Dreamer" (Angel Remix)		4:25
6.	"O-Fa-Fu"	"Stay This Way" UK single	2:45
7.	"Keep It Coming"	"Don't Let It Go to Your Head" UK single	6:14
8.	"Forever" (Soulpower Remix)	"Forever" UK single	5:09
9.	"Keep Together" (Jan Kincaid Version)		4:59
10.	"Country Funkin'"		4:45
11.	"Worlds Keep Spinning"	Brother Sister UK release	5:08
12.	"Midnight at the Oasis" (Ian Green Remix)	Brother Sister UK release	3:45
