= Dream On Dreamer (song) =

1994 single by the Brand New Heavies

Single by the Brand New Heavies

from the album Brother Sister
- Released: 14 March 1994
- Genre: Acid jazz; funk; soul
- Length: 3:33
- Label: FFRR
- Songwriters: N'Dea Davenport; Dallas Austin
- Producer: The Brand New Heavies

The Brand New Heavies singles chronology
"Don't Let It Go to Your Head" (1992)	"Dream On Dreamer" (1994)	"Midnight at the Oasis" (1994)

Music video
- "Dream On Dreamer" on YouTube

"Dream On Dreamer" is a song by British acid jazz and funk group the Brand New Heavies, released in March 1994 by FFRR Records as the lead single from the group's third album, Brother Sister (1994). It is written by group member N'Dea Davenport and Dallas Austin, and the radio version was mixed by Mark "Spike" Stent. The track received critical acclaim from music critics and became a top-10 hit on the UK Singles Chart and in Scotland, while in the US and Canada, it reached numbers 51 and 47 on the American Billboard Hot 100 and the Canadian RPM Top Singles chart. The accompanying music video was directed by Josh Taft. "Dream On Dreamer" is also featured on their remix album, Excursions: Remixes & Rare Grooves (1995), that was released in the US.

== Critical reception ==
Larry Flick from Billboard magazine described the song as "a rumbling bit o' retro-funk, fueled with the sultry vocal presence of Davenport. Song's immediately contagious chorus is the ticket to active play in pop and urban sectors." He added, "Not to be missed." Troy J. Augusto from Cash Box named it Pick of the Week, declaring it as an "infectious, groove-heavy jam". He complimented the singer as "a gifted, dynamic and quite flexible vocalist who evens lifts some of the Heavies' mediocre material out of the darkness. Luckily, this track isn't one of those lesser moments and is only guaranteed longer shelflife thanks to her presence." Cash Box editor Gil L. Robertson IV named it a standout track from the Excursions: Remixes & Rare Grooves album. Dave Sholin from the Gavin Report stated that the Heavies' soon-to-be released album Brother Sister, "will be a welcome sight and sound to the thousands of fans who have been waiting patiently for its release. Expect this first single to whet everyone's appetite that much more."

Caroline Sullivan from The Guardian described it as "sleek" and "mainstream". Chuck Campbell from Knoxville News Sentinel remarked that on the "hook-oriented" track, "the rich-voiced Davenport is the centerpiece around which bandmates Simon Bartholomew, Andrew Levy and Jan Kincaid swirl inviting music". Maria Jimenez from Music & Media named it a "soulful gem". Andy Beevers from Music Week gave it a score of four out of five and named it Pick of the Week in the category of Dance, saying, "London's purveyors of stylish jazz, soul and funk finally get around to releasing some brand new material. 'Dream On Dreamer' is a classy soul track with David Morales providing a suitably smooth mix." Paul Moody from NME wrote, "'Dream On Dreamer' comes on like the sassiest thing on the block, but somehow it's pure gloss." Another NME editor, Ian McCann, noted that "N'Dea swoops magnificently into a pool of delicious strings." Parry Gettelman from Orlando Sentinel said the song "show the right way to update disco." Ralph Tee from the Record Mirror Dance Update felt the group "are back in fine form on this extremely appealing new two step soul shuffler. The group's only version is naturally of acoustic orientation, with real drumming, keyboards and horns gelling very nicely on this soulful outing". James Hamilton complimented the "lovely delicate jogging 95bpm Morales [remix]" in his weekly Record Mirror dance column.

== Music video ==
The music video for "Dream On Dreamer" was directed by American director Josh Taft, featuring the group performing in an outdoor setting. There is a storyline of a young black man, rowing a little boat on the sea. He meets an old man in a hot air balloon and arrives at a castle, where lead singer N'Dea Davenport appears, wearing a crown and dressed in a white dress. The video has a sepia tone and was nominated for Best Clip of the Year in the category for Pop/AC at the 1994 Billboard Music Video Awards. "Dream On Dreamer" received "break out" rotation on MTV Europe and was B-listed on German music television channel VIVA in May 1994.

== Track listings ==
- 12-inch, UK (1994)
1. "Dream On Dreamer" (Angel Extended Mix) — 5:50
2. "Dream On Dreamer" (Bad Yard Dub Part 2) — 6:55
3. "Dream On Dreamer" (Heavies Motion Mix) — 8:35
4. "Dream On Dreamer" (New Degree Vocal Dub) — 6:37
- CD single, Europe (1994)
1. "Dream On Dreamer" (Heavies Radio Version) — 3:33
2. "Dream On Dreamer" (Morales 7-Inch) — 3:54
3. "Dream On Dreamer" (Heavies Motion Mix) — 8:45
4. "Dream On Dreamer" (T-Empo Dub Mix) — 7:25
- CD maxi, US (1994)
1. "Dream On Dreamer" (Dallas Austin Remix) — 4:49
2. "Dream On Dreamer" (Dallas Austin Instrumental) — 4:48
3. "Dream On Dreamer" (Morales Remix) — 7:30
4. "Dream On Dreamer" (Morales Reprise Instrumental) — 4:35
5. "Dream On Dreamer" (Heavies Mix) — 4:50
6. "Dream On Dreamer" (Heavies Mix Instrumental) — 4:49
7. "Snake Hips" — 2:04
8. "Dream On Dreamer" (The Angel Remix) — 5:54
9. "Dream On Dreamer" (The Angel Remix Instrumental) — 5:55

== Charts ==
=== Weekly charts ===
Chart (1994)	Peak position
Canada Top Singles (RPM)	47
Canada Contemporary Hit Radio (The Record)	29
Europe (Eurochart Hot 100)	39
Europe (European AC Radio)	24
Europe (European Dance Radio)	14
Europe (European Hit Radio)	39
Germany (Media Control)	56
Netherlands (Dutch Top 40 Tipparade)	13
Quebec (ADISQ)	27
Scotland (OCC)	19
UK Singles (OCC)	15
UK Club Chart (Music Week)	16
UK Dance (Music Week)	2
US Billboard Hot 100	51
US Hot R&B Singles (Billboard)	19
US Cash Box Top 100	31

=== Year-end charts ===
Chart (1994)	Position
US Hot R&B Singles (Billboard)	99

== Release history ==
Region	Date	Format(s)	Label(s)	Ref.
United Kingdom	14 March 1994	12-inch vinyl; CD; cassette	FFRR	
Australia	18 April 1994	CD; cassette	FFRR; Polydor	
