= The Brand New Heavies =

British jazz and funk band

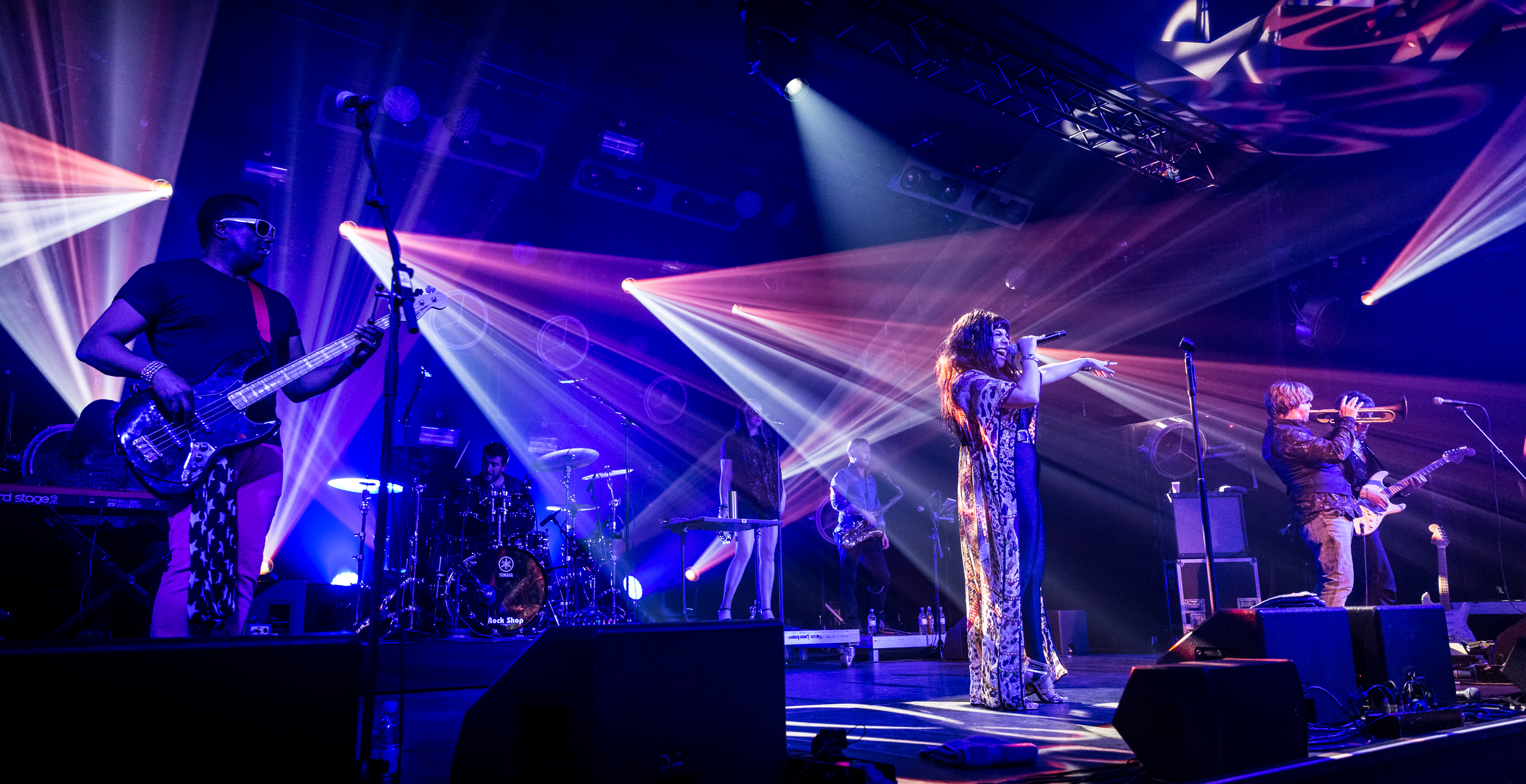
- The Brand New Heavies performing in 2016

Background information
- Origin: Ealing, London, England
- Genres: Acid jazz; jazz rap
- Years active: 1985–present
- Labels: Acid Jazz; Delicious Vinyl; FFRR; Chrysalis UK; EDEL
- Members: Simon Bartholomew; Andrew Levy; Angela Ricci
- Past members: Jaye Ella Ruth; Lascelles Gordon; Sunship; N'Dea Davenport; Siedah Garrett; Carleen Anderson; Sy Smith; Nicole Russo; Jan Kincaid; Dawn Joseph; Sulene Fleming; Honey Larochelle
- Website: the-brand-new-heavies.com

The Brand New Heavies are an English band formed in 1985, consisting of Simon Bartholomew, Andrew Levy, and Jan Kincaid. After the addition of N'Dea Davenport in 1990, the group experienced mainstream success and pioneered a new genre called acid jazz.

The Brand New Heavies released their debut self-titled album in June 1990. The album was reissued in 1991 with newly recorded vocals by American singer-songwriter N'Dea Davenport, a new addition to the lineup. The album's singles "Never Stop", "Dream Come True", and "Don't Let It Go to Your Head" became a success with the latter two charting in UK Top 25. Their breakthrough success came with the release of their third album Brother Sister in April 1994, which peaked at number 4 on UK Albums Chart and became certified platinum by the British Phonographic Industry (BPI). The album's lead single "Dream On Dreamer" charted in the top 20 in several different countries, including peaking at number 15 on the UK Singles Chart. Davenport departed from the group and was replaced with American singer-songwriter Siedah Garrett. The group released their fourth album Shelter in April 1997 to commercial success, achieved another certified platinum album by the British Phonographic Industry (BPI). Garrett departed from the group in 1998 and was replaced by Carleen Anderson.

After Anderson's departure in 2000, the group experienced a decline in mainstream popularity after being fronted by several session singers before Davenport's return in 2006. The group released Get Used to It in June 2006, followed by their live album Live in London in 2009. In April 2013, they released their album Forward, an album featuring vocals by Davenport and new addition Dawn Joseph. The group hired Dawn Joseph as their featured vocalist, ultimately releasing Davenport from the group. Following the release of the album Sweet Freaks (2014), Joseph and Jan Kincaid departed from the group. Sulene Fleming toured with the group from 2016 to 2018, before being replaced with Angela Ricci.

The Brand New Heavies have sold over 2.5 million records worldwide and regarded as one of the leading bands in the genre of acid jazz.

== History ==
=== 1985–1990: Formation and early years ===
In 1985, Simon Bartholomew, Jan Kincaid, and Andrew Levy formed a band originally called Brother International. The band recorded a demo which was played at a nightclub called The Cat in the Hat. After the demo received positive feedback in the club, the band was booked to perform at the club. In 1987, Brother International opened for James Brown at a concert at Wembley Arena. Shortly after their brief stint with Brown, the group changed their name to The Brand New Heavies, inspired by one of Brown's honorific titles "Minister of New Super Heavy Funk". In June 1988, The Brand New Heavies released a single titled "Got to Give" on Cooltempo Records. In 1989, the group moved to Eddie Piller's Acid Jazz Records and developed a new genre of music called acid jazz.

In mid-1989, The Brand New Heavies released their second single "People Get Ready". The group added female vocalist Jaye Ella Ruth to the lineup and began recording their first album. On 1 June 1990, The Brand New Heavies released their debut self-titled album. The album's lead single "Dream Come True" peaked at number sixty-three on the US Hot R&B/Hip-Hop Songs chart. Ruth departed from the group shortly after the release of single.

=== 1991–1999: Breakthrough success and lineup changes ===
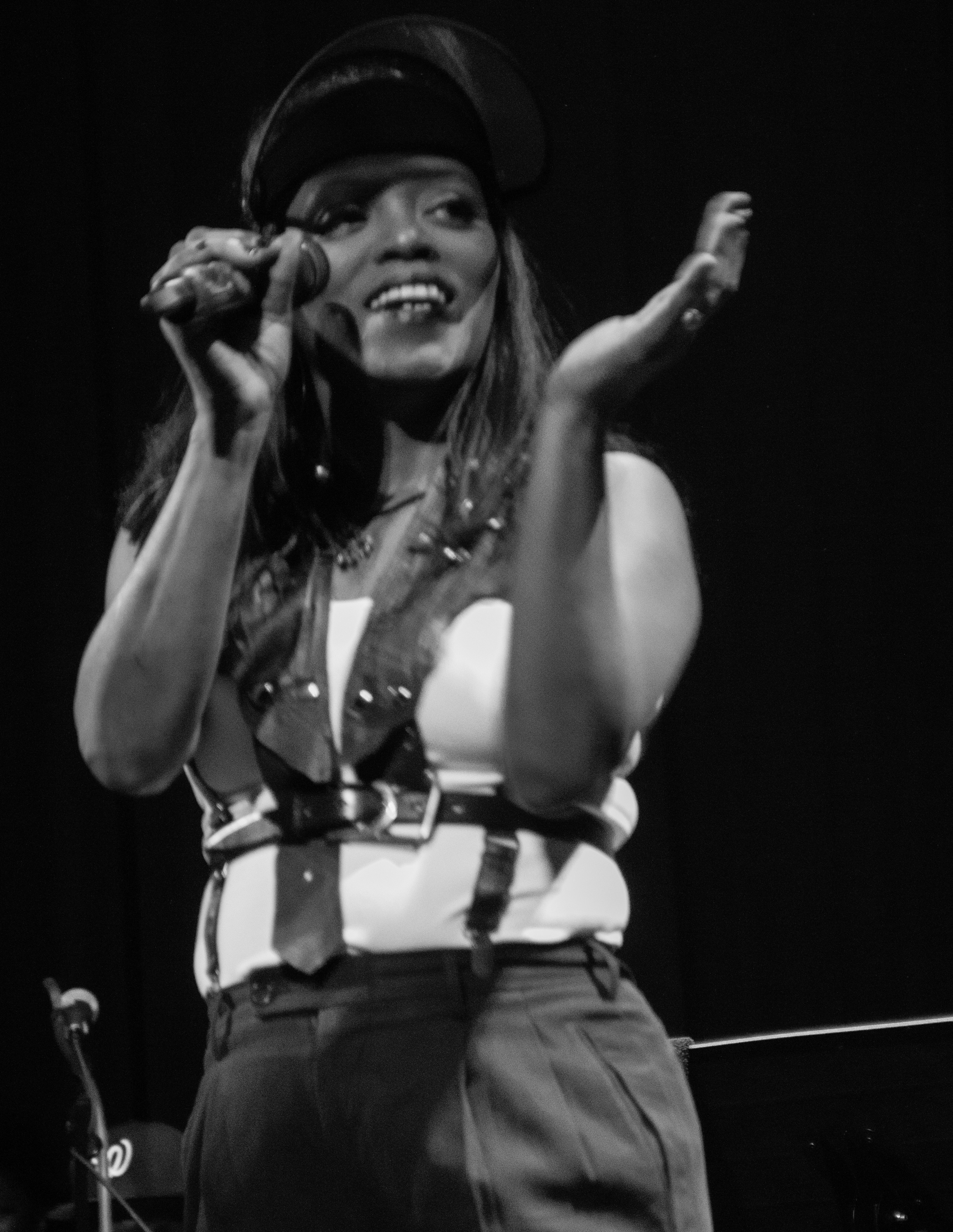
N'Dea Davenport was the most notable lead vocalist of The Brand New Heavies.

At the recommendation of their record label, American singer N'Dea Davenport was added to the lineup in 1990. The group re-recorded and released their first album on Delicious Vinyl with lead vocals by Davenport in 1991. The album peaked at number twenty-four on the UK Albums Chart and earned a silver-certification by the British Phonographic Industry (BPI). The group reissued their singles; "Dream Come True", "Stay This Way", and "Don't Let It Go to Your Head", all of which peaked in the top forty on the UK Singles Chart. The success of the album invited the group to perform on Soul Train, Showtime at the Apollo, and Top of the Pops. Their follow-up album Heavy Rhyme Experience, Vol. 1 was released in 1992.

In March 1994, they released their third album Brother Sister. Brother Sister peaked at number four on the UK Albums Chart and earned platinum-certification by the BPI. The album spawned the single "Dream On Dreamer" which became crossover hit, peaking within the top twenty on several international music charts. The music video of "Dream On Dreamer" also received a MTV Video Music Award nomination for "Best R&B Video". The album's follow-up singles "Back to Love" and a cover version of "Midnight at the Oasis" peaked in the top thirty on the UK Singles chart. At the Brit Awards in 1995, the group received a nomination for "British Dance Act". Davenport left the group due to irreconcilable differences in 1996 and was replaced with American singer-songwriter Siedah Garrett.

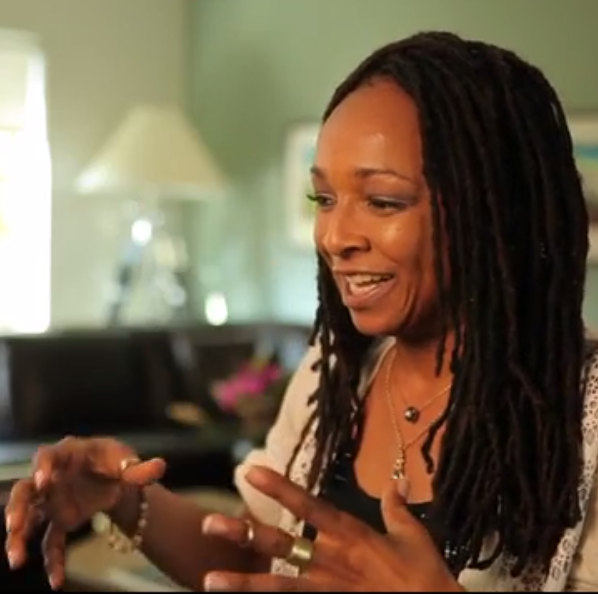
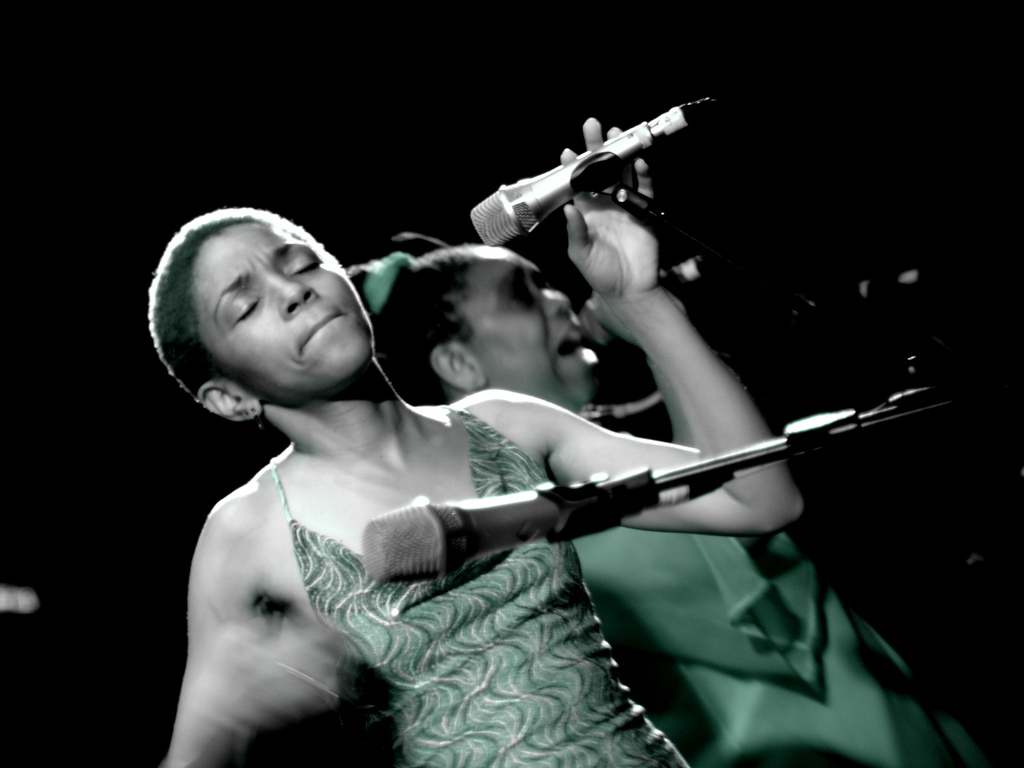
The group's lead singers included Garrett (left) from 1995-1998, and Anderson (right) from 1998-2000.

In April 1997, the group's third album Shelter was released. Like its predecessor, the album peaked in the top five on the UK Albums Chart and platinum-certification by the BPI. The album's lead single "Sometimes" peaked at number eleven on the UK Singles Chart and earned silver-certification by the BPI. The album's follow-up singles "You Are the Universe" and "You've Got a Friend" charted in the top twenty-five; with the latter peaking at number nine.

In 1998, Garrett departed from the group to continue her songwriting career. She was replaced by American singer Carleen Anderson. In the same year, they released a song called "More Love" which featured on the soundtrack to the comedy-drama film Sliding Doors. Anderson recorded a few songs with the group, most notably "Saturday Nite" and a re-recorded version of her song "Apparently Nothin'", which appeared on the group's compilation album Trunk Funk – The Best of The Brand New Heavies in September 1999. The album received silver-certification from the BPI. In 2000, Anderson departed from the group to record her third solo album.

=== 2000–2004: Declined success ===
In 2000, the group experienced a decline in mainstream popularity. They were dropped from their record deal with FFRR Records and Delicious Vinyl. In 2003, they released their fifth studio album titled We Won't Stop on Canyon International. The album failed to reach the success of their previous albums. The group returned to the studio to record another album. During the recording of their upcoming album, they were introduced to Nicole Russo by their management. Russo was invited to write and record on the album and soon became their featured vocalist. Their follow-up album Allabouthefunk was independently released in October 2004. The album yielded two singles; "Boogie" and "Surrender" which failed to reach the top forty on UK Singles Chart.

=== 2005–2013: Davenport's return ===
In 2005, Davenport accepted the group's invitation to rejoin the group. The group also reunited with Delicious Vinyl and began recording their forthcoming album in London. In June 2006, the group released their seventh album Get Used to It. The album's lead single was a cover version of Stevie Wonder's song "I Don't Know Why (I Love You)", which peaked at number twelve on the UK R&B Singles chart. The group headlined their concert tour from 2006 to 2008. They released two remix albums titled Elephantitis: The Funk + House Remixes (2007) and Elephantitis: The Funk + House Remixes 2 (2009). In October 2009, they released a live album titled Live in London, which features their concert performance at The O2 Arena on 16 October 2008, in London.

In November 2011, The Brand New Heavies released a instrumental album called Dunk Your Trunk. In April 2013, The Brand New Heavies released their album Forward. The album featured lead vocals by Davenport and new addition Dawn Joseph. Davenport however was not invited back to finish recording on the album and when the group released "Sunlight" (which features Davenport's vocals) as the album's lead single, Davenport was not featured in the music video. The group toured during the latter part of 2013, often using concert flyers with Davenport's image to market the tour. In a statement issued from Davenport's Facebook, she announced that she was not invited to rejoin the group on their concert tours and any shows marketed with her likeness would not include her. On 10 October 2013, The Brand New Heavies released a statement on their website stating that Dawn Joseph had officially joined the band as their full-time lead vocalist.

=== 2014–present: Subsequent releases ===
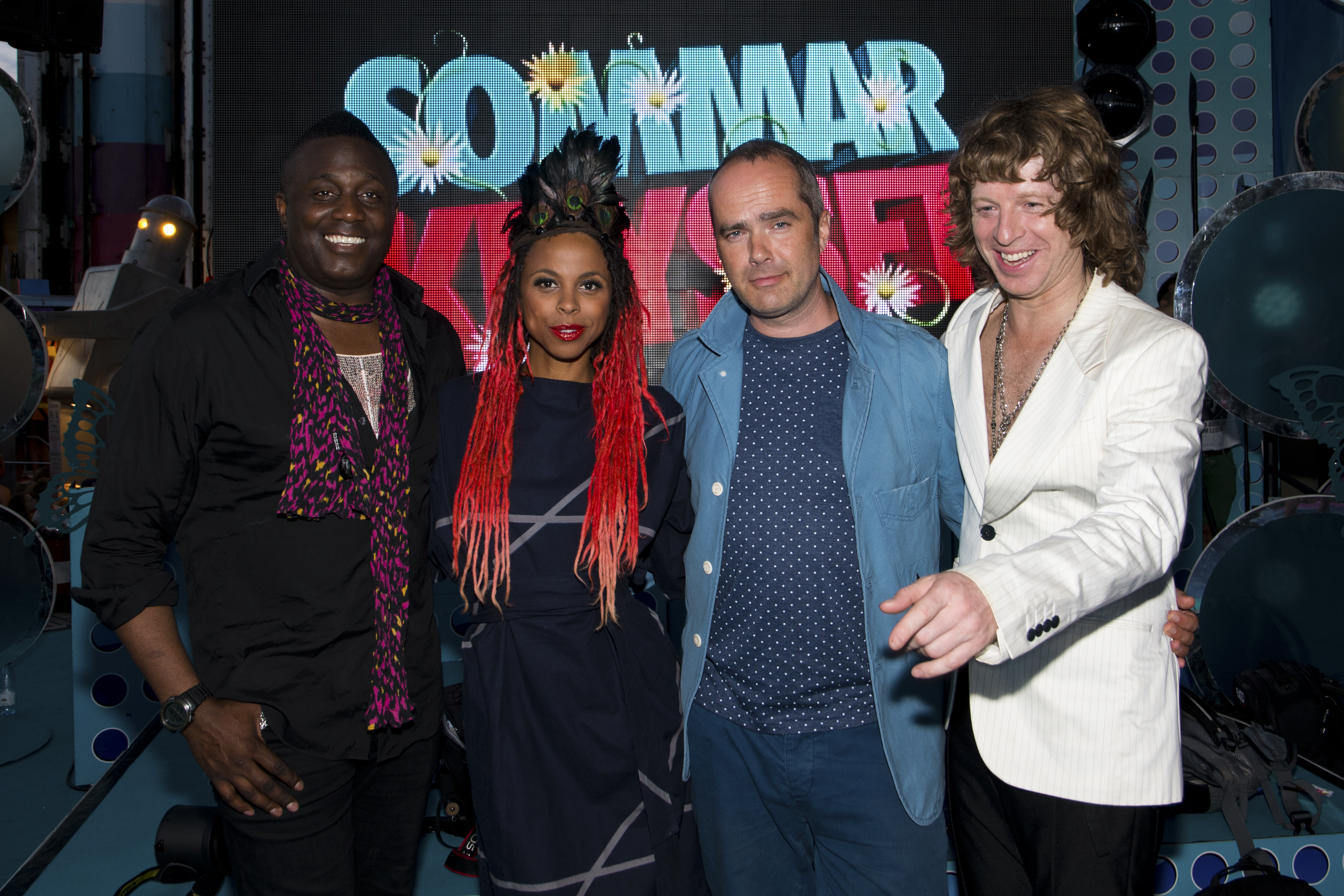
Dawn Joseph was lead vocalist for the band from 2013 to 2015.

In October 2014, The Brand New Heavies released their ninth studio album Sweet Freaks, with Dawn Joseph on lead vocals. Jan Kincaid and Dawn Joseph both left The Brand New Heavies in late 2015. In June 2016, Davenport briefly re-joined the band for a two-month tour and left again in August 2016. In July 2016, Sulene Fleming joined and toured with the group until 2018. In November 2018, the band started touring with Angela Ricci on vocals. In April 2019, The Brand New Heavies released "Getaway", a previously recorded unreleased song which featured N'Dea Davenport on vocals. The group released their studio album, TBNH, on 6 September 2019 on Acid Jazz Records. The album features unreleased songs recorded with Davenport, Siedah Garrett, Angie Stone, Beverley Knight, Angela Ricci, Jack Knight, Honey Larochelle, and Laville. In July 2024, The Brand New Heavies announced their plans to release a deluxe edition of their album Brother Sister titled Brother Sister 30th Anniversary Deluxe Edition. The group also announced their upcoming Brother Sister 30 UK Tour with Ricci as their featured vocalist.

== Legacy ==
The Brand New Heavies have been considered as one of the defining bands of the acid jazz, a genre mixture of jazz, funk, and hip-hop music. The group have sold over 2.5 million records worldwide. In 2020, the group was nominated for a Lifetime Achievement Award at the third annual Pop Magazine Awards.

In April 2021, an art exhibition called Brand New Heavies was curated by Racquel Chevremont and Mickalene Thomas. The exhibition featured the work of artists Abigail DeVille, Xaviera Simmons, and Rosa-Johan Uddoh. The curators also chose the name as the featured artists considered themselves the "New Heavies" of the artworld. The exhibition opened at Pioneer Works in Brooklyn, New York City on April 2.

== Members ==
Current members

- Simon Bartholomew – vocals, guitar, producer (1985–present)
- Andrew Levy – bass, keyboards, producer (1985–present)
- Angela Ricci – vocals (2018–present)

Former members

- Jan Kincaid – vocals, drums (1985–2015)
- Lascelles Gordon – percussion, keyboards (1985–1992)
- Ceri Evans – keyboards (1985–1992)
- Jaye Ella Ruth – lead vocals (1990)
- Rob Cremona – keyboards (1990–1991)
- Jim Wellman – saxophone (1990–1991)
- N'Dea Davenport – lead vocals, tambourine (1990–1995, 2005–2013, 2016)
- Mike Smith – saxophone (1994–1996)
- Dennis Rollins – trombone (1994–1996)
- John Thirkell – trumpet, flugelhorn (1994–1997)
- Siedah Garrett – lead vocals (1995–1998)
- Carleen Anderson – lead vocals (1999–2000)
- Sy Smith – session vocalist (2003)
- Nicole Russo – lead vocals (2003–2004)
- Dawn Joseph – lead vocals (2013–2015)
- Sulene Fleming – vocals (2016–2018)

== Discography ==
- The Brand New Heavies (1990)
- Heavy Rhyme Experience, Vol. 1 (1992)
- Brother Sister (1994)
- Shelter (1997)
- We Won't Stop (2003)
- Allabouthefunk (2004)
- Get Used to It (2006)
- Dunk Your Trunk (2011)
- Forward (2013)
- Sweet Freaks (2014)
- TBNH (2019)

== Awards and nominations ==
Year	Award	Category	Nominee/work	Result	Ref.
1994	MTV Video Music Award	Best R&B Video	"Dream on Dreamer"	Nominated	
1995	Brit Awards	British Dance Act	The Brand New Heavies	Nominated	
1998	Brit Awards	British Dance Act	The Brand New Heavies	Nominated	
2020	Pop Magazine Awards	Lifetime Achievement Award	The Brand New Heavies	Nominated	
