= Heavy Rhyme Experience, Vol. 1 =

Studio album by the Brand New Heavies
- Released: 3 August 1992
- Genre: Acid jazz, funk, hip hop
- Length: 35:27
- Label: Acid Jazz, Delicious Vinyl
- Producer: The Brand New Heavies

The Brand New Heavies chronology
The Brand New Heavies (1990)	Heavy Rhyme Experience, Vol. 1 (1992)	Brother Sister (1994)

Professional ratings
Review scores
Source	Rating
AllMusic	4/5 stars
Entertainment Weekly	B+
RapReviews	8.5/10
(The New) Rolling Stone Album Guide	2/5 stars

Heavy Rhyme Experience, Vol. 1 is a 1992 studio album by the Brand New Heavies. It includes collaborations with Main Source, Gang Starr, Grand Puba, Masta Ace, Jamalski, Kool G. Rap, Black Sheep, Ed O.G., Tiger, and the Pharcyde.

== Track listing ==
No.	Title	Length
1.	"Bonafied Funk" (featuring Main Source)	3:58
2.	"It's Gettin' Hectic" (featuring Gang Starr)	4:00
3.	"Who Makes the Loot?" (featuring Grand Puba)	3:25
4.	"Wake Me When I'm Dead" (featuring Masta Ace)	3:41
5.	"Jump 'n' Move" (featuring Jamalski)	3:18
6.	"Death Threat" (featuring Kool G. Rap)	3:22
7.	"State of Yo" (featuring Black Sheep)	3:36
8.	"Do Whatta I Gotta Do" (featuring Ed O.G.)	3:22
9.	"Whatgabouthat" (featuring Tiger)	3:07
10.	"Soul Flower" (featuring the Pharcyde)	3:41

== Personnel ==
- Simon Bartholomew – guitar
- Andrew Levy – bass guitar
- Jan Kincaid – drums
- Paul Daley – percussion
- Mike Smith – saxophone
- Martin Shaw – trumpet

== Charts ==
Chart (1992)	Peak position
US Billboard 200	139
US Top R&B Albums (Billboard)	49
