= Midnight at the Oasis =

1974 single by Maria Muldaur

Single by Maria Muldaur

from the album Maria Muldaur
- B-side: "Any Old Time"
- Released: November 1973
- Genre: Soft rock; jazz pop; soul
- Length: 3:49
- Label: Reprise
- Songwriter: David Nichtern
- Producers: Lenny Waronker; Joe Boyd

Maria Muldaur singles chronology
"Midnight at the Oasis" (1973)	"I'm a Woman" (1974)

Official audio
- "Midnight at the Oasis" on YouTube

"Midnight at the Oasis" is a song by the American singer Maria Muldaur from her 1973 debut album, Maria Muldaur. Written by David Nichtern, it is her best-known recording.

The song peaked at number six on the US Billboard Hot 100 and number 21 on the UK Singles Chart in 1974. Billboard ranked it as the No. 13 song for 1974. It was also nominated for both Record of the Year and Song of the Year at the 17th Annual Grammy Awards, held in 1975. In Canada, the song reached number two on the RPM singles charts and number 45 on the year-end chart.

== Description ==
The song is an offer of a desert love affair in a fantasy setting. AllMusic reviewer Matthew Greenwald describes the song as "so sensual and evocative that it was probably one of the most replayed records of the era and may be responsible for the most pregnancies from a record during the mid-'70s."

The song includes an instrumental section that features the guitar work of Amos Garrett.

In 2008, Muldaur recalled that she wanted to add the song to her album as an "afterthought" at the last minute. She has acknowledged that people do approach her at her concerts or events and claim that this song has inspired sexual encounters, loss of virginity, and pregnancy.

== Personnel ==
- Maria Muldaur – vocals
- David Nichtern – acoustic guitar
- Mark T. Jordan – piano
- Greg Prestopino – voices
- Freebo – bass
- Amos Garrett – electric guitar
- Jim Gordon – drums
- Nick DeCaro – string arrangements

== Charts ==
=== Weekly charts ===
Chart (1973/1974)	Peak position
Australia (Kent Music Report)	10
Canada Top Singles (RPM)	2
Canada Adult Contemporary (RPM)	1
UK Singles (Official Charts)	21
US Billboard Hot 100	6
US Adult Contemporary (Billboard)	7
US Cash Box Top 100	5

=== Year-end charts ===
Chart (1974)	Rank
Australia (Kent Music Report)	81
Canada Top Singles (RPM)	45
US Billboard Hot 100	13
US Cash Box Top 100	42

== Brand New Heavies version ==
"Midnight at the Oasis"

Single by the Brand New Heavies

from the album Brother Sister
- Released: July 25, 1994
- Genre: Acid jazz; funk
- Length: 4:05
- Label: FFRR; Delicious Vinyl
- Songwriter: David Nichtern

The Brand New Heavies singles chronology
"Back to Love" (1994)	"Midnight at the Oasis" (1994)	"Sometimes" (1997)

A version of "Midnight at the Oasis" was recorded by British acid jazz and funk group the Brand New Heavies, attributed to "Brand New Heavies featuring N'Dea Davenport". This version was released in July 1994 by FFRR and Delicious Vinyl and reached number 13 in the UK and number 11 in Scotland in August 1994. It was their biggest hit until the departure of Davenport, when "Sometimes" made number 11 in 1997 with new singer Siedah Garrett. "Midnight at the Oasis" was featured on their 1994 album Brother Sister.

=== Critical reception ===
Caroline Sullivan from The Guardian stated about N'Dea Davenport, her "...glistening voice glorifies even a lazy cover version of 'Midnight at the Oasis'." In his weekly UK chart commentary, James Masterton described it as a "faithfully rendered cover". A reviewer from Music & Media said, "Usually lite funky music is identified with garden parties and romantic restaurants at night by trendy clubbers, but not if marketed under the acid jazz banner. This is hip guys!" Alan Jones from Music Week gave it a score of four out of five and named it Pick of the Week, writing, "Stripped of the stretched jazzy gliding that typified Maria Muldaur's original, this 1974 hit is speeded up somewhat but adapts perfectly to the Acid Jazz treatment. More radical overhauls are also included for clubs, where the record is already going down a storm." Ian McCann from NME named it "a latinish cover". Tony Cross from Smash Hits said it "sounds suspiciously like a funked-up Barry Manilow song".

=== Music video ===
A music video was produced to promote the single. It was directed by directors Max Giwa and Dania Pasquini, known as just Max & Dania, and filmed in London. The video was B-listed on German music television channel VIVA in November 1994.

=== Track listing ===
- CD single, UK
1. "Midnight at the Oasis" (Radio Version) – (3:48)
2. "Midnight at the Oasis" (Rogers Brand New Radio Anthem) – (4:35)
- CD single, UK (BNHCD 05)
1. "Midnight at the Oasis" (Radio Version) – (3:48)
2. "Midnight at the Oasis" (Extended Version)
3. "Midnight at the Oasis" (Opaz 7" Version)
4. "Midnight at the Oasis" (Roger's Brand New Radio Anthem) – (4:35)

=== Charts ===
==== Weekly charts ====
Chart (1994)	Peak position
Europe (Eurochart Hot 100)	51
Europe (European Dance Radio)	8
Europe (European Hit Radio)	25
Germany (Media Control)	68
Netherlands (Dutch Top 40 Tipparade)	15
Netherlands (Dutch Single Tip)	8
New Zealand (RIANZ)	48
Scotland (OCC)	11
UK Singles (OCC)	13
UK Dance (OCC)	8
UK Airplay (Music Week)	3
UK Dance (Music Week)	8
UK Club Chart (Music Week)	19

==== Year-end charts ====
Chart (1994)	Position
UK Singles (OCC)	134
UK Airplay (Music Week)	34

=== Personnel ===
- Simon Bartholomew
- N'Dea Davenport – Vocals
- Jan Kincaid
- Andrew Levy

== Other covers ==
- Jazz versions of this song have been recorded by Hubert Laws on The Chicago Theme (1975), by Freddie Hubbard on the live album Gleam (1975) and the studio album Liquid Love (1975), and by Wayne Henderson on "Living On A Dream" (1978).
- Percy Faith recorded an easy listening version on Chinatown Feat. the Entertainer (1974), which features the guitar work of Larry Carlton.
- A cover version of the song appears on the album Dust Yourself Off (1975) by the funk band Pleasure.
- Saxophone instrumental version by Rudy Pompilli, player for Bill Haley & His Comets), was included on his 1976 album Rudy's Rock: The Sax That Changed the World.
- Betty Wright Live (1978), by Betty Wright, includes a medley version of "Clean Up Woman" that includes parts of "Midnight at the Oasis".
- The Sun City Girls released a version of the song on their album Midnight Cowboys from Ipanema (1986).
- The American jazz guitarist Steve Oliver released a version of the song on his album First View (1993).
- That Dog released a version of the song on the album Spirit of '73: Rock for Choice (1995).
- Jazz guitarist Martin Taylor included an instrumental version on his album Kiss and Tell (2000) with support from saxophonist Kirk Whalum.
- Actress and Broadway singer Valarie Pettiford of UPN's Half & Half covered the song on her album Hear My Soul (2004).
- Renee Olstead sings the song on her 2004 self-titled album.
- Marina Prior recorded the song for her album Both Sides Now (2012).
- Nicole Henry covered the song in her album “Time to Love Again” (2021).

== Remix version ==
In 2004, Muldaur's original version was featured on the CD What Is Hip: Remix Project 1, a compilation of pop songs remixed for the clubs. The single is billed as the "Cuica Remix", with the track extended from its 3:49 recording to 4:49, incorporating portions of the background vocal, strings, and instrumental break with semi-chilled out Ibiza-themed elements.

== In popular culture ==
- An instrumental version was used in the movie White Line Fever (1975), as was another David Nichtern song, "Drifting and Dreaming of You".
- It was performed in American Pie at the prom.
- The song is sung by the singer from the lounge band in Bob Harris's (Bill Murray) hotel room shower in Sofia Coppola's film Lost in Translation.
- In the film The First $20 Million Is Always the Hardest (2002), Andy (played by Adam Garcia) plays this song while sitting on the floor of his room, and Alisa (Rosario Dawson) comes in singing and dancing.
- In Whisper (2007), when Roxanne (Sarah Wayne Callies) lulls the kidnapped boy, David Sandborn (Blake Woodruff) to sleep.
- The song was frequently used as bumper music on Coast to Coast AM with Art Bell.
- Sheila and Ron Albertson (Catherine O'Hara and Fred Willard) perform the song as part of their audition in the 1996 Christopher Guest mockumentary Waiting for Guffman.
