= N'Dea Davenport =

American musician (born 1966)

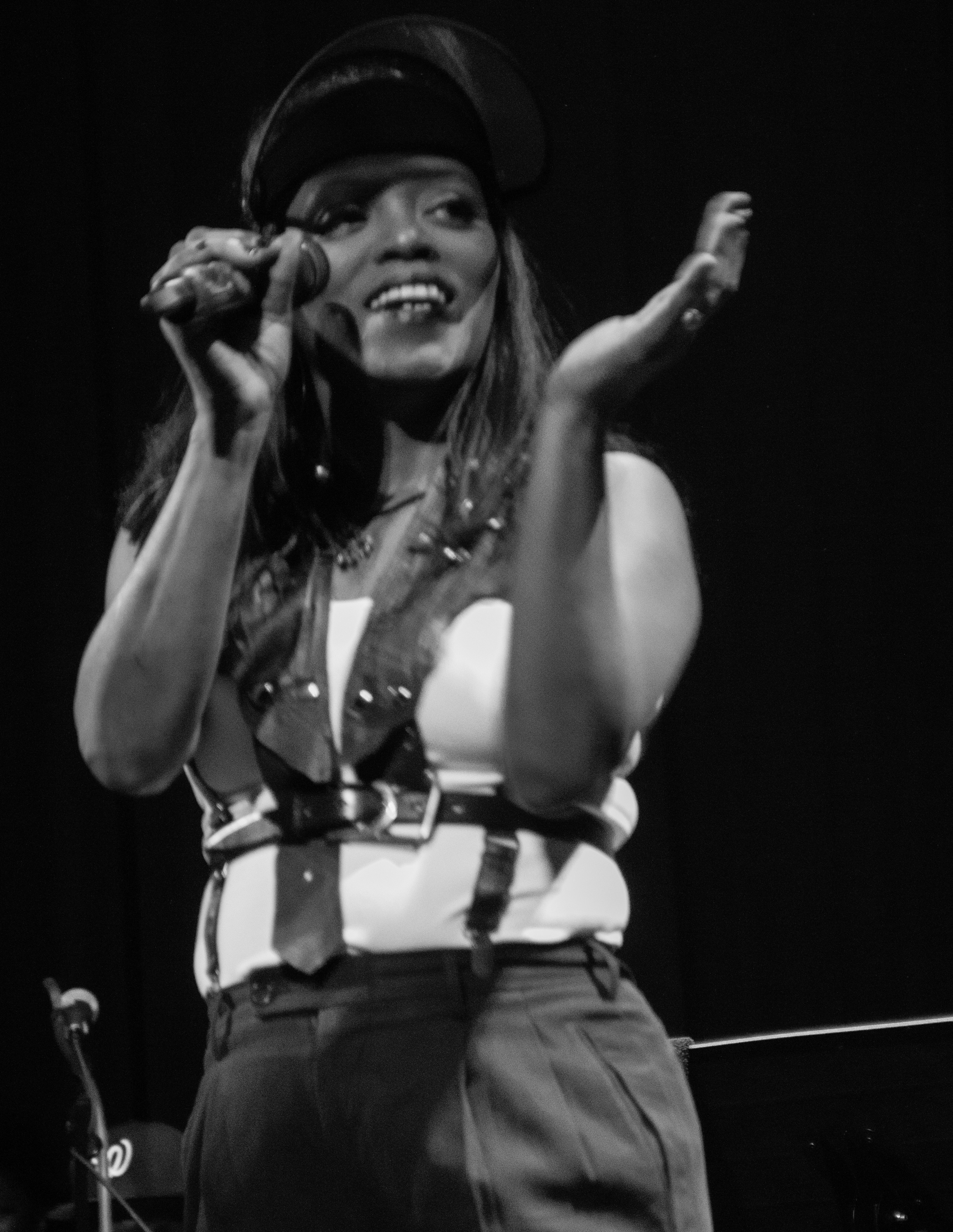
- Davenport performing in 2014

Background information
- Born: September 22, 1966 (age 60)
- Origin: Atlanta, Georgia, U.S.
- Genres: R&B; acid jazz; funk; soul; hip hop; dance
- Occupations: Singer; songwriter; record producer
- Instruments: Vocals; keyboard; drums
- Years active: 1988–present
- Labels: Delicious Vinyl; London; V2
- Formerly of: The Brand New Heavies

N'Dea Davenport (born September 22, 1966) is an American singer, songwriter, dancer and producer. She was the lead vocalist in the UK acid jazz band The Brand New Heavies and made pioneering contributions to the genre of acid jazz.

== Early life ==
She attended and graduated from Clark Atlanta University. After graduating from college, Davenport relocated to Los Angeles and engaged in theatrical productions and commercial music videos.

== Career ==
=== 1988–1989: Career beginnings ===
In 1988, Davenport began her career as a session vocalist and began performing background vocals for several singers. In January 1989, she made her debut as a guest lead vocalist on American rapper Tone Lōc's song "Cheeba Cheeba" for his album Lōc-ed After Dark. After appearing on Tone Lōc's album, Davenport secured a record deal with his record label Delicious Vinyl. In July 1989, she appeared "Algernon's Simply Awfully Good At Algebra", which was featured on Malcolm McLaren and The Bootzilla Orchestra's album Waltz Darling. Throughout the duration of 1989, she appeared several other albums including Def Jef's Just a Poet with Soul, Michael Paulo's One Passion, Robert Kraft's Quake City, and Belinda Carlisle's Runaway Horses.

=== 1990–1995: The Brand New Heavies ===
At the recommendation of Delicious Vinyl record label owners Matt Dike and Michael Ross, Davenport joined English band The Brand New Heavies who needed a lead female vocalist to replace their previous vocalist Jaye Ella Ruth in 1990. The Brand New Heavies re-recorded their first album to feature newly recorded vocals with Davenport. In 1991, the group released a re-recorded version of their debut self-titled album on Delicious Vinyl. The album became the band's first charting album and peaked at number twenty-four on the UK Albums Chart and earned a silver-certification by the British Phonographic Industry (BPI). The band reissued their singles; "Dream Come True", "Stay This Way", and "Don't Let It Go to Your Head" with Davenport's vocals, all of which peaked in the top forty on the UK Singles Chart. The success of the album invited the group to perform on Soul Train, Showtime at the Apollo, and Top of the Pops. Their follow-up album Heavy Rhyme Experience, Vol. 1 was released in 1992.

In March 1994, they released their third album Brother Sister. Brother Sister peaked at number four on the UK Albums Chart and earned platinum-certification by the BPI. The album spawned the single "Dream On Dreamer" which became crossover hit, peaking within the top twenty on several international music charts. The music video of "Dream On Dreamer" also received a MTV Video Music Award nomination for "Best R&B Video". The album's follow-up singles "Back to Love" and a cover version of "Midnight at the Oasis" peaked in the top thirty on the UK Singles chart. At the Brit Awards in 1995, the group received a nomination for "British Dance Act". By the end of 1995, Davenport left the group due to irreconcilable differences and was replaced with American singer-songwriter Siedah Garrett.

=== 1996–2004: Solo career ===
In 1996, Davenport returned to America and resumed her solo career. During the recording of her first album, Davenport signed a recording contract with V2 Music. In June 1998, Davenport released her debut self-titled album. Despite the positive reviews from music critics, the album did not perform well on the charts, only peaked at number fifty-six on the US Top R&B/Hip-Hop Albums chart, respectively. The album's lead single "Bring It On" peaked at number seventy-six on the US Hot R&B/Hip-Hop Songs chart. She toured extensively in support of the album with the concert series Lilith Fair. When the relationship at V2 came to an end, she continued musically primarily focusing on European dance music projects.

=== 2005–2013: Reunion with The Brand New Heavies and formation of Celectrixx ===
In 2005, Davenport accepted the group's invitation to rejoin the group. The group also reunited with Delicious Vinyl and began recording their forthcoming album in London. In June 2006, the group released their seventh album Get Used to It. The album's lead single was a cover version of Stevie Wonder's song "I Don't Know Why (I Love You)", which peaked at number twelve on the UK R&B Singles chart. The group headlined their concert tour from 2006 to 2008. In October 2009, they released a live album titled Live in London, which features their concert performance at The O2 Arena on 16 October 2008, in London.

In late 2009, Davenport formed an "acoustic electronic" musical duo with Japanese DJ and musician Katsuya Everywhere called Celectrixx. Celectrixx toured in several countries, performing various musical sets of remixed songs and newly recorded songs.

In April 2013, The Brand New Heavies released their album Forward. The album featured lead vocals by Davenport and new addition Dawn Joseph. Davenport however was not invited back to finish recording on the album and when the group released "Sunlight" (which features Davenport's vocals) as the album's lead single, Davenport was not featured in the music video. The group toured during the latter part of 2013, often using concert flyers with Davenport's image to market the tour. In a statement issued from Davenport's Facebook, she announced that she was not invited to rejoin the group on their concert tours and any shows marketed with her likeness would not include her. On 10 October 2013, The Brand New Heavies released a statement on their website stating that Dawn Joseph had officially joined the band as their full-time lead vocalist.

=== 2014–present: Current projects ===
In February 2016, Davenport was featured on Louie Vega's "Magical Ride (Wave of Love)" for his album Louie Vega Starring...XXVIII. In June 2016, Davenport reunited with The Brand New Heavies for a two-month tour. In October 2020, she appeared on Horse Meat Disco's song "Fight for Love" for their album Love and Dancing.

== Personal life ==
Davenport held residency in New Orleans but lived primarily in New York City. She relocated back to New Orleans after her apartment became unlivable due to the September 11 attacks; in which her apartment was two blocks away from the World Trade Centers.

== Discography ==
Solo album

- N'Dea Davenport (1998)

The Brand New Heavies albums

- The Brand New Heavies (1990)
- Heavy Rhyme Experience, Vol. 1 (1992)
- Brother Sister (1994)
- Get Used to It (2006)
- Live in London (2009)
- Forward (2013)
- Shibuya 357: Live in Tokyo 1992 (2021)
