= Cydeways: The Best of The Pharcyde =

Cydeways: The Best of the Pharcyde

Greatest hits album by the Pharcyde
- Released: January 16, 2001
- Genre: Hip-hop
- Label: Delicious Vinyl; Rhino
- Producer: The Pharcyde; J-Swift; Jay Dee; L.A. Jay

The Pharcyde chronology
| Plain Rap (2000) | Cydeways: The Best of the Pharcyde (2001) | Humboldt Beginnings (2004) |

Professional ratings
Review scores
| Source | Rating |
|---|---|
| Allmusic | 4/5 stars |
| RapReviews | 8/10 |

Cydeways: The Best of the Pharcyde is a greatest hits album by American hip-hop group the Pharcyde. It was released January 16, 2001. The album features songs by the four emcees; Fatlip, Slimkid3, Imani and Bootie Brown from their first two albums Bizarre Ride II the Pharcyde and Labcabincalifornia while they were signed to label Delicious Vinyl.

The original recordings on Cydeways were handled by J-Swift, L.A. Jay & Slimkid3, J Dilla (known then as Jay Dee) and Fatlip. Included on the album is a remix of the song "She Said" by Jay Dee and the previously unreleased song "Panty Raid".

== Track listing ==
| No. | Title | Length |
|---|---|---|
| 1. | "It's Jigaboo Time" | 1:28 |
| 2. | "Ya Mama" | 4:22 |
| 3. | "Oh Shit" | 4:29 |
| 4. | "Quinton's on the Way" | 2:10 |
| 5. | "Pack the Pipe" | 5:05 |
| 6. | "Return of the B-Boy" | 3:34 |
| 7. | "4 Better or 4 Worse (Interlude)" | 0:37 |
| 8. | "Passin' Me By" | 5:03 |
| 9. | "Otha Fish" | 5:23 |
| 10. | "Drop" | 5:38 |
| 11. | "Runnin'" | 4:56 |
| 12. | "Somethin' That Means Somethin'" | 3:29 |
| 13. | "Devil Music" | 4:14 |
| 14. | "She Said (Jay-Dee Remix)" | 4:25 |
| 15. | "Panty Raid" | 4:04 |
