= Runnin' (The Pharcyde song) =

Single by The Pharcyde

from the album Labcabincalifornia
- Released: October 7, 1995
- Recorded: 1995
- Genre: Hip-hop
- Length: 4:56
- Label: Delicious Vinyl Records
- Songwriters: Trevant Hardson; Emandu Wilcox; Derrick Stewart; James Yancey
- Producer: Jay Dee

The Pharcyde singles chronology
"Drop" (1995)	"Runnin'" (1995)	"She Said" (1996)

Audio sample
- file; help

Music video
- "Runnin'" on YouTube

"Runnin'" is a song performed by American hip-hop group The Pharcyde and produced by J Dilla. It was released as the first single from the group's second album, Labcabincalifornia, in 1995. "Runnin'" is The Pharcyde's best-selling song from this album. It peaked at fifty-five on the Billboard Hot 100, thirty-five on the U.S. R&B chart, and thirty-six on the UK singles chart. The track is included in their greatest hits compilation Cydeways: The Best of The Pharcyde. It is one of the group's most remembered songs, along with "Passin' Me By".

== Sampling ==
"Runnin'" contains samples from "Saudade Verm Correndo" (1963) by Stan Getz and Luiz Bonfá, "Flying Easy" (1969) by Woody Herman, "You Follow Me" (1978) by James Moody, and "Rock Box" (1984) by Run-DMC.

In turn, "Runnin'" has been sampled by a number of artists, including Mýa ("Fallen", 2003), Rocky Marsiano ("The Runaway Beat", 2005), Wiz Khalifa ("Name on a Cloud", 2009), The Roots ("Clock With No Hands", 2006), Limp Bizkit ("Full Nelson", 2000), and the rap band 1995 ("La Source", 1995), among others.

== Charts ==
Chart (1995–1996)	Peak position
New Zealand (Recorded Music NZ)	34
Scotland Singles (OCC)	59
UK Hip Hop/R&B (OCC)	7
UK Singles (OCC)	36
US Billboard Hot 100	55
US Hot R&B/Hip-Hop Songs (Billboard)	35
US Hot Rap Songs (Billboard)	5

== Certifications ==
Region	Certification	Certified units/sales
United Kingdom (BPI)	Silver	200,000^{‡}
^{‡} Sales+streaming figures based on certification alone.
