= Sold My Soul: The Remix & Rarity Collection =

Compilation album by the Pharcyde
- Released: November 8, 2005
- Genre: Hip-hop
- Label: Funky Chemist

The Pharcyde chronology
Instrumentals (2005)	Sold My Soul: The Remix & Rarity Collection (2005)	Timeless (2025)

Sold My Soul: The Remix & Rarity Collection is a compilation album by American hip-hop group the Pharcyde. It was released on November 8, 2005 and features a number of remixes and rare songs by the group.

The compilation contains various remixes such as those by the late hip-hop producer J Dilla, who was also responsible for the production of The Pharcyde's second album Labcabincalifornia, Rae & Christian, Matt Dike, Fuzz Face & tWank boy, L.A. Jay, Da Beatminerz and Kenny Dope.

It also features collaborations by Brand New Heavies and Buckwheat of The Wascals, as well as previously unreleased Delicious Vinyl singles and the song "Pandemonium" featured on Street Fighter: The Movie Soundtrack.

== Track listing ==
Disk One
No.	Title	Length
1.	"Soul Flower" (Brand New Heavies Version)
2.	"Ya Mama" (Matt Dike Remix)
3.	"Just Don't Matter"
4.	"Otha Fish" (L.A. Jay Remix)
5.	"She Said" (Mike Caren Remix)
6.	"Live @ Dodger Stadium"
7.	"Drop" (Da Beatminerz Remix)
8.	"Pandemonium"
9.	"Soul Flower" (Dogs B*ll*cks)
10.	"Y? (Be Like That)" (Jay Dee Remix)
11.	"Passin' Me By" (Fly as Pie Remix)
12.	"Otha Fish" (The Heavy Head O.G. Remix)

Disk Two
No.	Title	Length
1.	"Ya Mama" (Remix)
2.	"She Said" (Jay Dee Remix)
3.	"Soul Flower" (Wrong Tree)
4.	"Emerald Butterfly"
5.	"Otha Fish" (The Angle Mix)
6.	"Runnin'" (Rae & Christian Remix)
7.	"Passin' Me By" (Brixton Flavour)
8.	"Pork" (OG Version)
9.	"She Said" (Fuzz Face & tWank boy Remix)
10.	"Soul Flower" (2 tha 3 Mix)
11.	"Ya Mama" (Kenny Dope Remix)
12.	"My Soul"
