= Instrumentals (The Pharcyde album) =

Compilation album by the Pharcyde
- Released: September 13, 2005
- Genre: Hip-hop
- Label: Delicious Vinyl

The Pharcyde chronology
Humboldt Beginnings (2004)	Instrumentals (2005)	Sold My Soul: The Remix & Rarity Collection (2005)

Instrumentals is an album by American hip-hop group the Pharcyde. The album was released September 13, 2005 by Delicious Vinyl Records. It contains the instrumental tracks of songs found in their debut album Bizarre Ride II the Pharcyde and its follow up release Labcabincalifornia.

== Track listing ==
Instrumentals track listing
No.	Title	Length
1.	"Oh Shit!"	4:29
2.	"4 Better or 4 Worse"	4:17
3.	"I'm That Type of Nigga"	5:30
4.	"On the D.L."	4:27
5.	"Officer"	4:04
6.	"Ya Mama"	3:46
7.	"Passin' Me By"	5:02
8.	"Otha Fish"	4:13
9.	"Return of the B-Boy"	3:30
10.	"Bullshit"	4:27
11.	"Pharcyde"	4:29
12.	"Groupie Therapy"	4:22
13.	"Runnin'"	5:02
14.	"Somethin' That Means Somethin'"	3:33
15.	"Drop"	3:49
16.	"Devil Music"	4:18
17.	"The E.N.D."	4:21
Total length:		74:40
