= Plain Rap =

Studio album by the Pharcyde
- Released: November 7, 2000
- Genre: Hip-hop
- Length: 57:30
- Label: Delicious Vinyl; Edel America
- Producer: Bootie Brown; J-Swift; Showbiz; Slimkid3

The Pharcyde chronology
Labcabincalifornia (1995)	Plain Rap (2000)	Cydeways: The Best of The Pharcyde (2001)

Singles from Plain Rap
- 1. "Trust" Released: 2000

Professional ratings
Aggregate scores
Source	Rating
Metacritic	65/100
Review scores
Source	Rating
AllMusic	4/5 stars
Los Angeles Times	2/4 stars
Now	2/5 Ns
RapReviews	6.5/10
The Village Voice	(choice cut)

Plain Rap is the third studio album by American hip-hop group the Pharcyde. It was released on November 7, 2000 via Delicious Vinyl and Edel America Records. Production was handled by members Bootie Brown and Slimkid3, as well as J-Swift and Showbiz. It features contributions from Black Thought, Buck Jes, Schmooche Cat, Sizwe, Diana Brooks, Dina Rae and Scott Wilson. In the United States, the album peaked at number 157 on the Billboard 200, number 67 on the Top R&B/Hip-Hop Albums and number 8 on the Independent Albums charts. Its only single "Trust" made it to number 15 on the Hot Rap Songs and number 35 on the Hot R&B/Hip-Hop Singles Sales charts.

The album marks the first LP without former member Fatlip. Slimkid3 left the group after the release of the album.

== Track listing ==
No.	Title	Producer(s)	Length
1.	"Trust" (performed by Bootie Brown, Imani and Slimkid3)	Bootie Brown	4:43
2.	"Network" (performed by Imani, Bootie Brown, Slimkid3 and Black Thought)	J-Swift	5:08
3.	"L.A." (performed by Imani, Slimkid3 and Bootie Brown)	Bedie	3:24
4.	"Somethin'" (performed by Slimkid3, Imani and Bootie Brown)	Slimkid3	4:52
5.	"Misery" (performed by Slimkid3, Bootie Brown and Imani)	Slimkid3	5:09
6.	"Blaze" (performed by Schmooche Cat, Buck Jes, Imani, Sizwe and Bootie Brown)	J-Swift	3:31
7.	"Rush" (performed by Imani, Bootie Brown and Slimkid3)	Bootie Brown	3:12
8.	"Sock" (Skit)		1:18
9.	"Guestlist" (performed by Imani, Slimkid3 and Bootie Brown)	Bootie Brown	3:51
10.	"Evolution" (performed by Imani, Bootie Brown and Slimkid3)	Bootie Brown	4:00
11.	"Front Line" (performed by Bootie Brown, Imani and Slimkid3)	Showbiz	4:48
12.	"World" (performed by Imani, Slimkid3 and Bootie Brown)	Slimkid3; Bedie (co.)	5:44
13.	"Trust" (Remix)	J-Swift
Total length:			57:30

Notes

- Tracks 3 and 8 were excluded from the US version of the album.

== Charts ==
Chart (2000)	Peak position
US Billboard 200	157
US Top R&B/Hip-Hop Albums (Billboard)	67
US Independent Albums (Billboard)	8
