= Otha Fish =

Single by the Pharcyde

from the album Bizarre Ride II the Pharcyde
- B-side: "Passin' Me By"
- Released: September 16, 1993
- Genre: Alternative hip-hop
- Length: 5:22
- Label: Delicious Vinyl
- Songwriters: R. Robinson; T. Hardson; J. Barnes
- Producers: Slimkid3; Additional Production and Remix: L.A. Jay

The Pharcyde singles chronology
"4 Better or 4 Worse" (1993)	"Otha Fish" (1993)	"Drop" (1995)

Music video
- "Otha Fish" on YouTube

"Otha Fish" is a song by American hip-hop group the Pharcyde, released September 16, 1993 through Delicious Vinyl Records. The song was the fourth single released from the group's 1992 debut album Bizarre Ride II the Pharcyde. The single peaked at number 35 on the US Dance Sales chart.

The song, produced by Slimkid3 and L.A. Jay, was also sampled by the American band Lovage for their song "Everyone Has A Summer" on Music to Make Love to Your Old Lady By.

It sampled the song “Today” by the jazz flautist Herbie Mann on the 1966 album Today!.

== Music video ==
A music video for the song was released on December 3, 2006, by the official channel of Delicious Vinyl.

== Track listing ==
=== A-Side ===
1. Otha Fish (Video Edit)
2. Otha Fish (L.A. Jay Remix)
3. Otha Fish (Video Edit Instrumental)

=== B-Side ===
1. Otha Fish (The Angel Remix)
2. Passin' Me By (Fly As Pie Mix)

== Charts ==
Title	Year	US Dance Singles
Title	Year	35
"Otha Fish"	1993	35
