= She Said (The Pharcyde song) =

Single by The Pharcyde

from the album Labcabincalifornia
- Released: July 30, 1996
- Recorded: 1995
- Genre: Hip-hop
- Length: 5:16
- Label: Delicious Vinyl Records
- Songwriters: Trevant Hardson; Derrick Stewart
- Producers: Slimkid3; Jay Dee (Remix)

The Pharcyde singles chronology
"Runnin'" (1995)	"She Said" (1996)	"Trust" (2000)

"She Said" is a song by The Pharcyde featured on the group's second album Labcabincalifornia. The song contains two verses by Slimkid3 and Fatlip, Fatlip's verse in particular is highly regarded among fans and critics of the group for its conversational style delivery and easy flowing pace. Both verses address issues of love and relationships. Slimkid3 does his first verse in his trademark incorporation of both singing and rapping. He also sings the ending of the song.

A brief portion of the first verse is also sampled for Portishead's song "Only You", on their eponymous second album.

== Critical reception ==
Bia Michel of Spin considered "She Said" one of the few songs on Labcabincalifornia to "distinguish themselves from the mid-tempo muddle" of the album, calling it a "harmony-driven" track that "tips towards the new R&B/rap hybrids flooding the charts".

== Music videos ==
The original music video for the song finds the group sky diving out of a plane to land on an island resembling Fantasy Island. Each member eventually finds their own woman on the island, while Tre and Fatlip rap about their experiences of love, be it Tre's explanation of desire or Fatlip's attempted pick up of a woman who doesn't want to make love with him. By the video's ending, the plane the group arrived on leaves without them, leaving the four of them stranded.

Another video was made for the "She Said" remix (by Jay Dee). it uses footage of the group's visit to Amsterdam. The video, shown in black and white, features the group having fun, riding boats in Amsterdam's canals and smoking cannabis. The remix by Jay Dee (J-Dilla) includes a sample from the song "Sinnerman" by Nina Simone. The sample, which contains a second or two of heavy rhythmic breathing, can be heard during the opening of the song.

More footage of the group's visit to Amsterdam can be seen in the documentary Cydeways: The Best of The Pharcyde (which includes all of the group's music videos as well).

== Charts ==
Chart (1996)	Peak position
Scotland Singles (OCC)	99
UK Hip Hop/R&B (OCC)	7
UK Singles (OCC)	51
US Dance Singles Sales (Billboard)	46
US Hot Rap Songs (Billboard)	30
