= Amongst Friends (soundtrack) =

Soundtrack album by Various artists
- Released: August 31, 1993
- Recorded: 1993
- Genres: Alternative rock, Hip hop
- Label: Atlantic
- Producer: Mark Hirsch

Professional ratings
Review scores
Source	Rating
Allmusic	2/5 stars

Amongst Friends is the soundtrack to the 1993 film, Amongst Friends. It was released on August 31, 1993, through Atlantic Records and consisted of a blend of alternative rock and hip hop.

== Track listing ==
1. "Innocent Child"- 6:00 (Big Audio Dynamite)
2. "It's a Shame About Ray"- 3:07 (The Lemonheads)
3. "Passin' Me By"- 5:04 (The Pharcyde)
4. "Kid's Alright"- 4:20 (Bettie Serveert)
5. "Wild Thing"- 4:24 (Tone Lōc)
6. "Crawl"- 4:25 (Sweet Band)
7. "Brooklyn"- 4:04 (MC Lyte)
8. "All the Young Dudes"- 3:30 (Mott the Hoople)
9. "Confusion"- 4:24 (Act of Mercy)
10. "Da Hood"- 3:56 (Da Youngstas)
11. "Train Going Backwards"- 6:17 (Dramarama)
12. "Long Island"- 5:10 (Mick Jones)
13. "No Ennio"- 5:09 (Mick Jones)
14. "I Don't Know"- 5:28 (Mick Jones)
