= V discography =

V discography may refer to:

- Discography of V of the South Korean boy group BTS
- Discography of the British boyband V

== See also ==
- Discography of the hip hop duo V & Legacy
