= Drop (The Pharcyde song) =

Single by the Pharcyde

from the album Labcabincalifornia
- B-side: "Y? (Be Like That)"
- Released: August 10, 1995
- Recorded: 1995
- Genre: Alternative hip-hop
- Length: 5:36
- Label: Delicious Vinyl
- Songwriters: Romye Robinson; Trevant Hardson; Emandu Wilcox; Derrick Stewart; James Yancey
- Producer: Jay Dee

The Pharcyde singles chronology
"Otha Fish" (1993)	"Drop" (1995)	"Runnin'" (1995)

Audio sample
- file; help

Music video
- "Drop" on YouTube

"Drop" is a single by American alternative hip-hop group the Pharcyde, released on August 10, 1995, as the second single for the group's second album, Labcabincalifornia. The single contains a reversed sample of Dorothy Ashby's recording of "Django", originally by the Modern Jazz Quartet, as well as a vocal sample of the Beastie Boys song "The New Style", using the titular "mmm..... drop" line delivered during a drop to create its hook.

== Music video ==
The music video for "Drop" was directed by Spike Jonze and filmed in Los Angeles. The video features Ad-Rock and Mike D in a cameo, artwork by pro skater Mark Gonzales, and footage of the group performing the song backwards, played in reverse. To help the group lip sync, the production team hired a UCLA professor researching phonetics, who transcribed the backwards lyrics and held them up as cue cards.

== Track listings ==
A-Side

1. Drop (Beatminerz Remix) (4:15)
2. Drop (Radio Remix) (3:45)
3. Drop (Beatminerz Remix Instrumental) (4:15)

B-Side

1. Runnin' (Jay Dee Remix) (4:30)
2. Y? (Be Like That) (Jay Dee Remix) (4:45)
3. Y? (Be Like That) (LP Version) (4:50)
4. Y? (Be Like That) (Jay Dee Remix Instrumental) (4:45)

== Charts ==
Chart (1996)	Peak position
US Billboard Hot 100	93
US Dance Singles Sales (Billboard)	4
US Hot R&B/Hip-Hop Songs (Billboard)	73
US Hot Rap Songs (Billboard)	5
