= Sharkey's Machine =

Studio album by Sharkey
- Released: May 25, 2004
- Genre: Hip hop
- Length: 63:25
- Labels: Babygrande, CNR
- Producers: Sharkey, Mickey Petralia, Mario Caldato, Jr.

Sharkey's Machine is the 2004 debut album of Washington, D.C. DJ and producer Sharkey (Shaun Sharkey). Ranging across a variety of styles, this hip hop work features vocalists including Cannibal Ox, Cherrywine ("Butterfly" from Digable Planets), Jean Grae, Grand Puba of Brand Nubian, and The Pharcyde.

== Critical reception ==
Professional ratings
Review scores
Source	Rating
AllHipHop	2.5/5 stars
Allmusic	2/5 stars
Pitchfork	2.7/10
PopMatters	unfavorable
The Washington Post	favorable

Reviews were generally negative, with critics finding the album to be an unexciting take on influences such as RJD2, DJ Shadow, N.E.R.D., and Zero 7. An exception was for the universally-praised track with Jean Grae, "whose tightly delivered vision of a New York apocalypse on "Summer in the City (Lovin' It)" is the album's obvious highlight" (Rollie Pemberton, Pitchfork).

== Track listing ==
No.	Title	Lyrics	Music	Length
1.	"Warming Up for a Scissor Fight"	Sharkey	Sharkey	1:04
2.	"Fuzz" (featuring Cannibal Ox)	S. Gardner, T. Arrington, Sharkey	S. Cooper, Sharkey	4:36
3.	"Phone Sex" (featuring Cherrywine)	I. Butler, Sharkey	Sharkey, P. Michel	3:29
4.	"Little Cabin Song" (featuring Zooks from The Spark and Billy Moon)	M. Griffin, C. Hollingsworth	Sharkey, P. Flood	3:51
5.	"If It Fits" (instrumental)		Sharkey	4:20
6.	"Summer in the City (Lovin' It)" (featuring Jean Grae)	T. Ibrahim	Sharkey	3:59
7.	"Skateboarder's Blues" (featuring Zooks from The Spark)	C. Hollingsworth, Sharkey	Sharkey	3:30
8.	"A Typical Day in Sunny Washington, DC" (featuring The GrayKid)	S. Cooper, Sharkey	Sharkey	2:24
9.	"Slo-Mo in the Grotto"	Sharkey	Sharkey, P. Michel	4:25
10.	"Here We Are" (featuring Billy Moon)	M. Griffin	P. Flood, Sharkey	3:24
11.	"Icewater"	Sharkey	Sharkey	2:09
12.	"Meltdown" (featuring Zooks from The Spark and The GrayKid)	S. Cooper, C. Hollingsworth	Sharkey, S. Cooper	3:26
13.	"All for Nothing" (featuring Grand Puba)	W. Dixon, M. Griffin	Sharkey	3:19
14.	"Song 20" (featuring Billy Moon)	M. Griffin	Sharkey	3:01
15.	"Snobird" (featuring The Pharcyde)	R. Robinson, I. Wilcox, M. Griffin, C. Hollingsworth	Sharkey	3:48
16.	"Zooks Vs Connery"	C. Hollingsworth	Sharkey	2:03
17.	"Something's Got to Give" (featuring Billy Moon)	M. Griffin, Sharkey	Sharkey, Elias Anthan	10:47
18.	"All Good Things in Good Time" (hidden track, featuring Billy Moon)	M. Griffin	Sharkey, P. Flood	3:33

== Personnel ==
- Sharkey – vocals, keyboards, programming, turntables
- Anntoinette Silva – vocals on tracks 1, 7
- Zooks – vocals on tracks 1, 16
- Elias Anthan - guitar on track 17
- The GrayKid – co-producer on tracks 2, 8, 17, 18
- Mickey Petralia – co-producer on tracks 4, 15
- Billy Moon – vocals on track 13
