= Amerigo Gazaway =

American producer, emcee and DJ (born 1985)

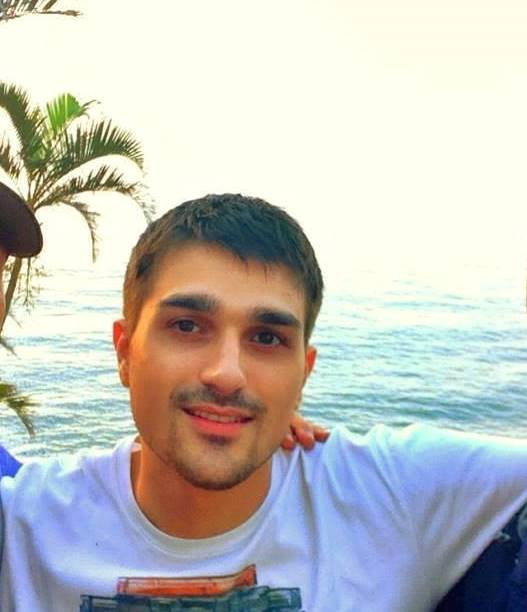

Background information
- Born: Amerigo Gazaway; November 9, 1985 (age 40)
- Origin: Nashville, Tennessee, U.S
- Genres: Mashup, Hip hop, Experimental
- Instruments: Keyboards, Turntables, Samplers
- Years active: 2010–present
- Label: Soul Mates
- Website: amerigomusic.com

Amerigo Gazaway (born November 9, 1985) is an American producer, emcee and DJ known for remixes, original instrumentals and digital sampling. He is best known for his documentary style conceptual collaboration albums which have incorporated the music of A Tribe Called Quest, The Pharcyde, Fela Kuti, De La Soul, Marvin Gaye, Yasiin Bey (a.k.a. Mos Def), James Brown and others. In 2014, his Yasiin Bey/Marvin Gaye remix "You Are Undeniable" was used in an Apple iPad commercial. and charted on Billboard's best-selling singles.

== Early life ==
Gazaway was born in Nashville, Tennessee on November 9, 1985. He is the son of internationally known jazz trumpeter Gary “El Buho” (the Owl) Gazaway from the Ozarks and Brazilian vocalist Tatiana Mindlin. Gazaway has said that he was influenced by radio growing up including the local WRVU radio station which introduced him to many old jazz tunes as well as hip hop. As a teen, Gazaway worked at computer shop which introduced him to programming. Gazaway senior took his son on tour when Amerigo reached 17, which further drew him to a life of music. After graduating from Middle Tennessee State University in 2011, Gazaway started 'The Soul Mates' project, a platform for his conceptual collaborations with his brother, Rickey Mindlin.

== Career ==
Under 'The Soul Mates' project, Gazaway's work has been called “legally iffy” and often uses more than a dozen unauthorized samples from different artists. Frequently facing legal challenges for his work, Gazaway has lectured on what he describes as "overly restrictive and unconstitutionally long copyright laws." at the University of Southern California and a Talks at Google interview: “Redefining the Remix”.

Gazaway's first full-length instrumental album, Selective Hearing Vol. 1, was released in 2010 on the Cold Busted label and charted on Beatport’s top-selling Chill-Out sales Chart.

Gazaway released his sophomore project, Fela Soul, in 2011. This was a mixture of the music of Afrobeat artist Fela Kuti and Hip-Hop group De La Soul. In December 2011, the album took a top 5 ranking on both NPR and Soul Train’s year-end “Best of 2011” list.

One year later, Gazaway released his third album, Bizarre Tribe: A Quest to the Pharcyde. Again, Gazaway mixed the music of two significant music acts – this time A Tribe Called Quest and The Pharcyde. Bizarre Tribe earned early praise from the Los Angeles Times, New York, and Okayplayer.

In 2014, Gazaway produced the album Yasiin Gaye, in which he presented an imaginary collaboration between Yasiin Bey (a.k.a. Mos Def) and Marvin Gaye. Gaining Marvin Gaye's original multi-tracks, Gazaway was able to deconstruct and rebuild the samples to re-orchestrate the instrumentation into new arrangements. The album earned Gazaway a five-star review from BET and praise from Marvin Gaye's widow, Janis Gaye.

As an emcee, Gazaway has released several singles, including "I Can't Get Off of the Facebook" in 2011.

== Style ==
Gazaway's mash-up style remixes are created from a process known as “reverse-engineering,” which heavily relies on a method of deconstructing and re-orchestrating original samples to bridge overlapping themes of two separate musician's catalogues. The resulting product has been described by the Los Angeles Times as “drawing a different design within a similar framework.”

In late 2019, Gazaway released a full album of new material with California R&B singer Xiomara called 1990. In his review of the album, Dan-O from Freemusicempire said "1990 does such a great job stretching out in all the trailblazing directions the decade explored."
