= One Stop Carnival =

Studio album by Brian Green
- Released: November 5, 1996
- Genre: Pop rap
- Length: 55:30
- Labels: Yab Yum Entertainment; 550 Music
- Producers: Michael McQuarn (exec.); Tracey Edmonds (exec.); BEIDE-2; Brian Green; Hakeem Abdulsamad; L.A. Jay; Slim Kid-3; Tikuwani Robinson; WILL 1X

One Stop Carnival is the debut and sole studio album of American rapper and actor Brian Green. It was released on November 5, 1996, by Yab Yum Entertainment and 550 Music (which was a subsidiary of Epic Records).

== Recording and production ==
The album's sound imitated other West Coast hip-hop acts from the era, including Souls of Mischief, The Pharcyde, and Ahmed. It was rumoured that several of Green's verses were ghostwritten by other artists. Green was known to be close friends with several of the album's guests, including slimkid3 and Kamau Holloway.

== Critical reception ==
Professional ratings
Review scores
Source	Rating
AllMusic	1.5/5 stars

One Stop Carnival was met with negative publicity, both inside and outside the hip-hop industry.

Green's music drew comparisons to A Tribe Called Quest, KRS-One and Vanilla Ice. The Onion and The A.V. Club both named the album as one of the least-essential of the 1990s.

AllMusic reviewer Jason Ankeny called the album "pallid, uninspired, and insufferably arrogant, with no acknowledgement that its very existence rests solely on Green's limited success as a secondary actor on a fading prime-time drama."

== Track listing ==
Credits adapted from Discogs.

One Stop Carnival standard edition
No.	Title	Writer(s)	Producer(s)	Length
1.	"The Closet"	Brian Green; Trevant Hardson; Anthony Walker; John Barnes III	Slim Kid-3; BEIDE-2; L.A. Jay	1:47
2.	"That's Right"	William Adams; Allan Pineda	WILL 1X	4:04
3.	"You Send Me"	Green; Hardson; Barnes	Slim Kid-3; L.A. Jay; Hakeem Abdulsamad	4:25
4.	"1-2-Threez"	Green; Hardson; Barnes; Kamau Holloway	Brian Green; Slim Kid-3; L.A. Jay	4:39
5.	"Style Iz It"	Green; Holloway	Green; Slim Kid-3; L.A. Jay	3:55
6.	"Music Business #@!$%" (interlude)	Green; Hardson; Barnes; Michael Alexander	Slim Kid-3; L.A. Jay	0:44
7.	"Didn't Have a Clue"	Green; Holloway; D.C. Thomas	Green; Slim Kid-3; L.A. Jay	4:24
8.	"Da Drama"	Green; Hardson; Barnes; Tikuwani Robinson	Green; Slim Kid-3; L.A. Jay; Tikuwani Robinson	4:47
9.	"Mind and Da Body"	Green; Holloway; Ralph Churchwell	Green; Slim Kid-3; L.A. Jay	4:00
10.	"Beauty and Da Beats"	Green; Holloway; Daniel Dumile; Alonzo Hodge	Green; Slim Kid-3; L.A. Jay	4:34
11.	"Hometown" (featuring Kamau)	Green; Hardson; Barnes; Holloway	Green; Slim Kid-3; L.A. Jay	4:16
12.	"You Send Me" (Jazz Mix)	Green; Hardson; Barnes	Slim Kid-3; L.A. Jay	4:51
13.	"Extacy" (featuring Will 1X)	Green; Hardson; Barnes; Adams	Slim Kid-3; L.A. Jay	3:14
14.	"Do What You Wanna Do"	Green; Hardson; Barnes; Holloway	Slim Kid-3; L.A. Jay	5:50
Total length:				55:30

Notes

- Slim Kid-3 provides backing vocals on tracks 1, 3, 4 and 10–14.
- Brian Green provides backing vocals on tracks 2–4 and 7–14.
- Will 1X provides backing vocals on track 2.
- Dawn provides backing vocals on tracks 3, 11 and 13.
- Tracey Moore provides backing vocals on tracks 3 and 13.
- L.A. Jay provides backing vocals on tracks 3, 5, 8 and 11.
- Kamau Holloway provides backing vocals on tracks 4, 5, 7 and 9.
- Mercedes Martinez provides backing vocals on track 10.
- BEIDE-2 provides backing vocals on track 11.
- Robert White provides backing vocals on track 11.

Sample credits

- "Style Iz It" contains samples from "My Philosophy", written and recorded by KRS-One
- "Didn't Have a Clue" contains samples from "Spinning Wheel", written by D. C. Thomas and recorded by Lonnie Smith
- "Beauty and Da Beats" contains samples from "Figure of Speech", written by Daniel Dumile and Alonzo Hodge and recorded by KMD
- "You Send Me" (Jazz Mix) contains samples from "Lament", written and recorded by Ahmad Jamal
- "Do What You Wanna Do" contains samples from "Feel Like Makin' Love" written by Eugene McDaniels and performed by Roberta Flack

== Personnel ==
Personnel adapted from Discogs.

Executive

- A&R – Kirdis Tucker, Zetra Smith
- A&R – Angelo Sanders
- A&R – Michael McQuarn
- Art direction, creative director – Bernard G. Jacobs
- Executive producer – Michael McQuarn, Tracey Edmonds
- Management – The Green Company
- Mastered by – Brian Gardner
- Photography by – F. Scott Schafer, Lonnie P. Parker

Technical

- L.A. Jay engineers on tracks 1, 6, 12 and 14; mixers on tracks 1 and 3–14; and scratches on tracks 5 and 12.
- BEIDE-2 engineers on track 1.
- George Ian Boxill engineers on tracks 2, 4, 5, 7 and 9–11.
- Rick Clifford mixers on tracks 2–14 and engineers on tracks 5, 7, 8, 10 and 11.
- WILL 1X mixers on track 2.
- Brian Green engineers on tracks 4, 5, 7 and 9–11.
- Brian Gardner mixers on track 6.
- Michael Alexander engineers on track 9.
- Chris Bolden engineers on tracks 12 and 14.

Instruments

- George Green plays drums on track 5.
- Ralph Churchwell plays electric Piano on track 5 and keyboards on track 9.
