= Humboldt Beginnings =

Studio album by The Pharcyde
- Released: July 13, 2004
- Genre: Hip-hop
- Length: 64:09
- Label: Chapter One
- Producers: The Pharcyde; 88-Keys; Spaceboyboogie X

The Pharcyde chronology
Cydeways: The Best of The Pharcyde (2001)	Humboldt Beginnings (2004)	Instrumentals (2005)

Professional ratings
Review scores
Source	Rating
AllMusic	2.5/5 stars
The Encyclopedia of Popular Music	3/5 stars
RapReviews	6.5/10

Humboldt Beginnings is the fourth studio album by the Pharcyde, released in 2004.

The group was down to two original members for the recording of Humboldt Beginnings: Bootie Brown and Imani. Two additional rappers, Spaceboyboogie X and "Greg" Smooche, appear on several tracks.

A music video was released for the track "Knew U".

== Critical reception ==
AllMusic wrote that "the frequent weed songs are interspersed with club thumpers ('The Uh-Huh'), smooth '80s-influenced lovers tracks ('Knew U,' 'Right B4'), and one of the most hilariously overblown gangsta tracks (perhaps humorous?) ever performed ('Bongloads II')." The Cleveland Scene wrote that "the ganjacentric album ... at least acknowledges the stoned-soul picnic that inspired the band's greatest moments." Phoenix New Times wrote that "tight, innovative production and clean, crisp flows contribute to a distinctly original nuance that helps separate the disc further from the group's previous efforts."

== Track listing ==
1. "Intro: Homegrown" (2:18)
  - Produced by The Pharcyde
2. "The Uh-Huh" (2:55)
  - Produced by 88-Keys
3. "Storm" (3:38)
  - Produced by Spaceboy Boogie X
4. "Skit" (0:11)
5. "Knew U" (3:11)
  - Produced by Spaceboy Boogie X
6. "Skit" (0:20)
7. "The Art of Sharing" (2:48)
  - Produced by The Pharcyde
8. "Bongloads II" (3:52)
  - Produced by Spaceboy Boogie X
9. "Skit" (0:11)
10. "Rules & Regulations" (4:38)
  - Produced by Spaceboy Boogie X
11. "Skit" (0:15)
12. "Illusions" (3:46)
  - Produced by the Pharcyde
13. "Mixedgreens" (4:05)
  - Vocals by Destani Wolf, Dee
  - Produced by Spaceboy Boogie X
14. "Right B4" (3:49)
  - Produced by Spaceboy Boogie X
15. "Clouds" (1:55)
  - Produced by Spaceboy Boogie X
16. "Skit" (0:41)
17. "The Bomb" (3:36)
  - Produced by Spaceboy Boogie X
18. "The Climb/Paranoia" (4:07)
  - Produced by The Pharcyde
19. "Skit" (0:41)
20. "Choices" (4:14)
  - Produced by 88-Keys
21. "Skit" (0:54)
22. "Dedication" (5:33)
  - Produced by The Pharcyde
23. "Outro: Praise" (2:10)/"Fastlife" (4:06)
  - Produced by Spaceboy Boogie X

== Personnel ==
Contributors
Producers
Producer(s)	The Pharcyde, 88-Keys, Spaceboyboogie X
Executive Producer(s)	Bootie Brown
Performers
Lead vocals and rapping	The Pharcyde
Additional and background vocals	Destani Wolf, Dee
Instrumentation	Juan Flores, Antonio Forbes, Tim Glum (bass guitar), Jason Thirteen (keyboard), Steven Kay (guitar), Stewart Killen (percussion), Sean Oshea (drums), Troy J. Parker, Sergio Rios (guitar), Alex Sylia, Eddie Turner
Technicians
Mixing	Claude "Swifty" Achille
Engineering	Steve Armstrong, Jason Powell
Mastering	Stephen Marsh

== Singles ==
Title	B-side	Release date
"Illusions"	"Illusions [Remix]" "Illusions [Remix][Instrumental]"	2004
"Knew U"		2004
