= Labcabincalifornia =

Studio album by the Pharcyde
- Released: November 14, 1995
- Recorded: 1994–1995
- Studio: Chung King Studios
- Genres: West Coast hip-hop; alternative hip-hop; jazz rap
- Length: 65:10
- Labels: Delicious Vinyl; Capitol
- Producers: Jay Dee; Bootie Brown; Diamond D; SlimKid3; M-Walk; Fat Lip

The Pharcyde chronology
Bizarre Ride II the Pharcyde (1992)	Labcabincalifornia (1995)	Plain Rap (2000)

Singles from Labcabincalifornia
- 1. "Drop" Released: August 10, 1995; 2. "Runnin'" Released: October 7, 1995; 3. "She Said" Released: July 30, 1996

Professional ratings
Review scores
Source	Rating
Allmusic	3/5 stars
Entertainment Weekly	B+
Los Angeles Times	2/4 stars
Muzik	5/5 stars
RapReviews	9/10
The Source	4/5 stars
Spin	5/10

Labcabincalifornia is the second album by American hip-hop group the Pharcyde, released on November 14, 1995, three years after their debut Bizarre Ride II the Pharcyde. The production was handled by The Pharcyde themselves and Jay Dee, with additional help from Diamond D and M-Walk. After Labcabincalifornia was released, Fatlip left the group to concentrate on his solo career.

== Content ==
The video for the album's first single, "Drop", was directed by Spike Jonze and used footage of the group performing the song backwards, replayed backwards, giving it a surreal quality. The song was a hit, as was the follow-up single "Runnin'," which peaked at #55 on the Billboard Hot 100. Overall, Labcabincalifornia is a more mellow and introspective affair than their debut and features more somber themes such as dealing with fame and success, drug abuse, and broken down relationships.

== Critical and commercial success ==
Album sales compared to Bizarre Ride did not fare as well; the group was not able to reach Gold status.

Influenced by the changes in their lives brought on by their rising popularity, Labcabincalifornia featured a completely different style from their first album. Largely produced by then-unknown J Dilla, it was panned by music critics on release, with some critics feeling that it fell victim to the sophomore jinx. However, over the years, Labcabincalifornia received critical acclaim, which the author Andrew Barker linked to the increased popularity of J Dilla.

== Track listing ==
Information is based on the album's liner notes

No.	Title	Writer(s)	Producer(s)	Length
1.	"Bullshit"	Trevant Hardson; Emandu Wilcox; Romye Robinson; James Yancey	Jay Dee	4:12
2.	"Pharcyde"	Hardson; Wilcox; Robinson; Derrick Stewart	Bootie Brown	4:20
3.	"Groupie Therapy"	Hardson; Wilcox; Robinson; Stewart; Joseph Kirkland	Diamond D	5:12
4.	"Runnin'"	Hardson; Wilcox; Stewart; Yancey	Jay Dee	4:56
5.	"She Said"	Hardson; Stewart	SlimKid3	5:15
6.	"Splattitorium"	Hardson; Wilcox; Yancey	Jay Dee	2:58
7.	"Somethin' That Means Somethin'"	Hardson; Robinson; Stewart; Yancey	Jay Dee	3:31
8.	"All Live" (Interlude)	Hardson; Stewart; Wilcox; Robinson; Yancey		0:51
9.	"Drop"	Hardson; Robinson; Wilcox; Yancey	Jay Dee	5:35
10.	"Hey You"	Hardson; Wilcox	SlimKid3	3:54
11.	"Y?"	Hardson; Robinson; Wilcox; Stewart; Yancey	Bootie Brown; Jay Dee^{[c]}	5:04
12.	"It's All Good!" (Interlude)			0:41
13.	"Moment In Time"	Hardson; L. Hackey; Mark Walker	M-Walk; SlimKid3^{[c]}	2:44
14.	"The Hustle" (featuring Big Boy, Schmooche Cat and Randy Mack)	Robinson; Kurt Alexander; Greg Campbell; Rich Shelton; John McDavid	Bootie Brown	5:34
15.	"Little D"			1:31
16.	"Devil Music"	Robinson; Hardson; Stewart	Fat Lip	4:12
17.	"The E.N.D."	Wilcox; Walker; Kamau Holloway	M-Walk	4:41
Total length:				65:11

European bonus tracks
No.	Title	Writer(s)	Producer(s)	Length
18.	"Emerald Butterfly"	Hardson; John Barnes III	SlimKid3; L.A. Jay	4:36
19.	"Just Don't Matter"	Wilcox; Hardson; Rahsaan Jackson	SlimKid3	5:58
Total length:				75:45

Notes

- ^{^[c]} indicates a co-producer.

== Sample credits ==
Unless otherwise indicated, information is based on the album's liner notes

- "Bullshit"
  - "Sing Me Softly of the Blues" as performed by The Gary Burton Quartet
  - "Get Up, Stand Up" as performed by Bob Marley & The Wailers
  - "What's Going On" by Les McCann
- "Pharcyde"
  - "Spinning Wheel" by Lonnie Smith
- "Groupie Therapy"
  - "Ladies First" as performed by Queen Latifah and Monie Love
  - "Inside Out" by Queen Latifah
  - "The Bilbao Song" by Cal Tjader
  - "Get Off...Come Here" by Ice Cube
  - "Lyrics to Go" by A Tribe Called Quest
- "Runnin'"
  - "Saudade Vem Correndo" as performed by Stan Getz & Luiz Bonfá
  - "Rock Box" as performed by Run-DMC
  - "You Follow Me" by James Moody
  - "Flying Easy" by Woody Herman
- "She Said"
  - "Down by the River" as performed by Buddy Miles
  - "Baby That's What I Need (Walk Tall)" as performed by Cannonball Adderley
  - Passin' Me By by The Pharcyde
- "Splattitorium"
  - "Fly Me to the Moon" by Vince Guaraldi Trio
- "Drop"
  - "Django" by Dorothy Ashby
  - "The New Style" by The Beastie Boys (vocal)
- "Hey You"
  - "In the Evening" as performed by Yusef Lateef
  - "Hey You! Get Off My Mountain" by The Dramatics
  - "Vitamin C" by Can
- "Y?"
  - "Why Is That?" by Boogie Down Productions
- "Moment in Time"
  - "Keep My Heart Together" by Mass Production
  - "You Can Fly" by Sons of Champlin
- "The Hustle"
  - "You Send Me" as performed by Roy Ayers & Carla Vaughn
  - "(I'm a) Fool for You" by Freddy Robinson
- "Devil Music"
  - "Eric B. Is President" as performed by Eric B. & Rakim
  - "Da Mystery of Chessboxin'" as written and performed by Wu-Tang Clan
- "The E.N.D."
  - "Sunny" as performed by Earl Grant
- "Emerald Butterfly"
  - "Anybody Needs a Big Man" by Cannonball Adderley Quintet

== Additional personnel ==
- Paul Arnold - Mix Engineer (2–4, 6, 8–12, 15–17)
- Big Boy - Additional Lead Vocals (14)
- Rick Clifford - Recording Engineer
- Bryan Davis - Mix Engineer (7), Recording Engineer
- Bob Durham - Keyboards (5)
- Jay Dee - Drums (8)
- Tim Latham - Mix Engineer (1, 13), Recording Engineer
- M-Walk - DJ Scratches
- James Mansfield - Mix Engineer (14), Recording Engineer
- Tim Nimitz - Mix Engineer (5)
- Randy Mack - Additional Lead Vocals (14)
- Farnando Pullum - Trumpet (17)
- Justin Reinhardt - Fender Rhodes (17), Organ played by (8)
- Schmooche Cat - Additional Lead Vocals (14)
- Madeline Smith - Sample Clearance Agent
- Mark Spier - Sample Clearance Agent
- Anthony "Biede" Walker - Recording Engineer
- Gary Wallis - Recording Engineer

== Charts ==
Chart (1995)	Peak position
US Billboard 200	37
US Top R&B Albums	17

=== Singles ===
Year	Title	Chart positions			
Year	Title	US Hot 100	US R&B	US Rap	US Dance Sales
1995	"Runnin'"	55	35	5	4
1995	"Drop"	93	73	5	4
1996	"She Said"	ー	ー	30	46
