= T-Love =

American rapper

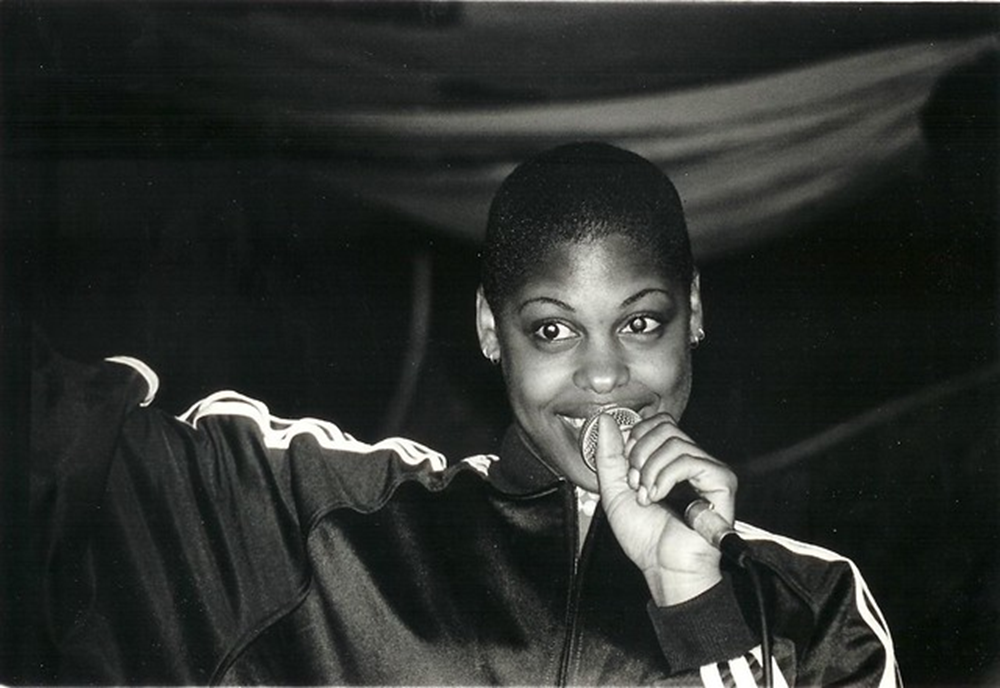

Background information
- Also known as: Taura Taylor, or Taura Love
- Born: Taura Taylor Mendoza; 1969 (age 56–57); Los Angeles, California
- Occupations: Rapper; Journalist
- Label: Pickininny Records
- Formerly of: Vidableu, Urban Prop
- Website: tauralove.com

Taura Taylor Mendoza, also known as Taura Taylor, or Taura Love, but most commonly known as T-Love, (born 1969) is an American rapper.

== Biography ==
T-Love, born as Taura Taylor Mendoza in Los Angeles, California, grew up in South Central Los Angeles with Dr. Dre. She began her career producing demos for Eazy-E and Jerry Heller's Ruthless Records and later recorded under the name Urban Prop at Capitol Records. At the age of 15, she made her debut on LA radio station KDAY. Simultaneously, she became a journalist, writing for magazines such as Vibe, URB, Hip Hop Connection, and The Source, and contributed to books such as It's Not About a Salary and Girl Power. During her journalism career, she interviewed film director Spike Jonze and musicians such as Beastie Boys, Run-DMC, Kool Keith, Snoop Dogg, Erykah Badu, Ultramagnetic MCs.

In 1998, after leaving Capitol, T-Love founded Pickininny Records. The label released music from Jurassic 5 and her EP, Return of the B-Girl. By the late 1990s, she engaged in international collaborations with DJ Ollie Teeba of The Herbaliser and members from the Ninja Tune label. Though she initially planned to end her music career with the EP, its success, especially in the UK, inspired her to continue.

Mendoza then relocated to London, where she found a more appreciative audience, even performing at the Glastonbury Festival. In 2003, she released a full-length album, Long Way Back, through Astralwerks. The album, which combined rap with elements of soul and jazz, included tracks that reflected personal experiences, heritage, and various musical influences. Apart from rapping, the album also highlighted her singing talents.

During her career, T-Love worked with music producers such as Jay Dee, Muddfoot aka The Alchemist, The Herbaliser, and Dwele. She also recorded vocals on commercially released songs for French hip-hop group Hocus Pocus.

In the 2023 West Adams Neighborhood Council election, Taura Taylor was elected as an At-Large Representative.

== Discography ==
=== EPs/LPs ===
- Return of the B-Girl (1998)
- Long Way Back (2003)
- Long Way Up: The Basement Tapes (2007)
- No Apologies: Best of T-Love (2008)

== Bibliography ==
- It's Not About a Salary
- Girl Power
