= V & Legacy =

American hip hop group

- Origin: Los Angeles, United States
- Genres: Hip hop
- Years active: Late 1990s–mid-2000s
- Labels: X-Ray / Cleopatra
- Members: V (Vlad Radovanov) (David) Legacy

V & Legacy were a hip hop duo who released the album 2000MG in 1999.

== History ==
The duo comprised Vlad Radovanov (aka V, born c. 1971) and David Legacy. V originated from Chicago where he had been a member of the hip hop group East of the Rock, and travelled to Los Angeles in 1995, determined to succeed as a rapper. He began performing regularly at the Galaxy Gallery, where he met David Legacy, a local rapper from South Central Los Angeles. United in their dislike of the predominant gangsta rap, they joined forces and began working together, influenced by the likes of Pharcyde and The Freestyle Fellowship. They recorded demos while working their day jobs as a bank teller (Legacy) and cigarette shiller (V). They were finally rewarded with a deal by Flip Records, although they moved to X-Ray Records/Cleopatra Records for their debut release, the "Lunatic Derelict" 12-inch in 1999. This was followed by their debut album 2000MG later the same year, which featured guest appearances from George Clinton, DJ Lethal, and Sen Dog and BoBo of Cypress Hill. 2000MG was reissued on CD the following year, but proved to be their final release, although three tracks from the album appeared on the 2004 compilation Cypress Thrill (2004). An extended version of their track "Monkey Mittens" with George Clinton was included on the 2004 album A Tribute to Cassidy. V made a guest appearance on Free Murda's 2007 album RZA Presents Free Murda: Let Freedom Reign.

Radovanov later worked as an attorney and co-founded the Universal Records-distributed Cobra Music label in 2006. He has also been involved in film, acting as executive producer for Interloper Films on titles such as We Live in Public, which won the 2009 Grand Jury Prize for Best Documentary at the Sundance Festival.

== Discography ==
- "Lunatic Derelict" 12-inch (1999), X-Ray/Cleopatra
- 2000MG (October 12, 1999), X-Ray/Cleopatra
