= The Pharcyde =

American hip-hop group

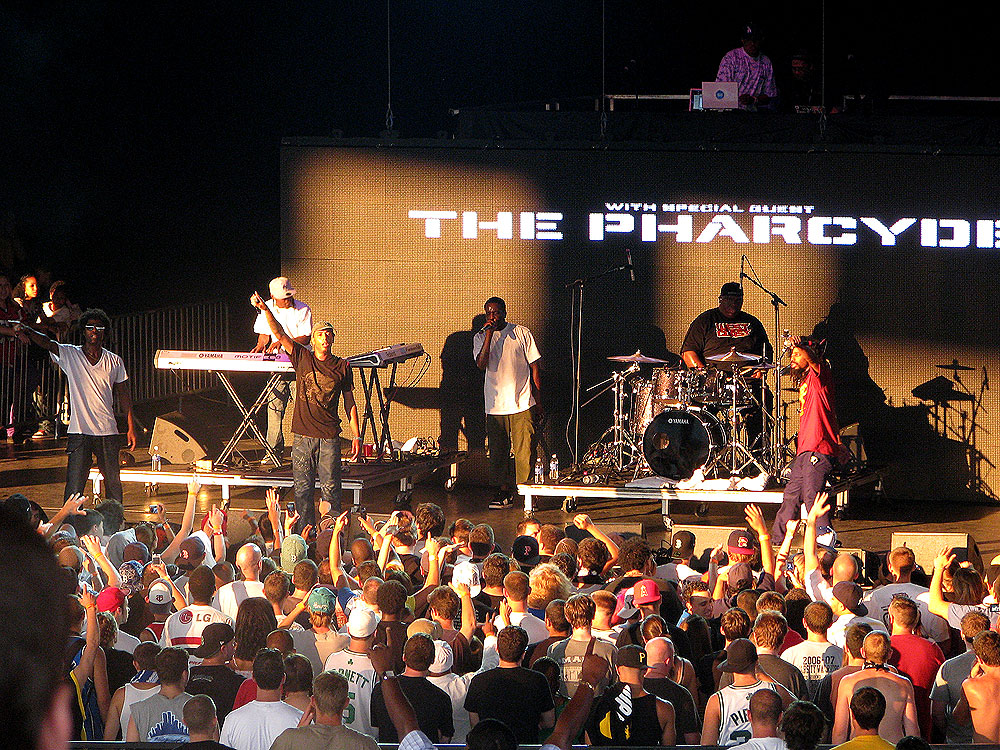
- The Pharcyde performing together at the Rock the Bells festival in 2008

Background information
- Also known as: The Far Side; The Pharcyde Lives
- Origin: Los Angeles, California, US
- Genre: Alternative hip-hop
- Years active: 1991–present
- Labels: Delicious Vinyl; Chapter One; Concord; EastWest; Capitol; Edel America; Four Music
- Members: Fatlip (1991–1997, 2020–present); Slimkid3 (1991–2000, 2020–present); Imani (1991–present)
- Past members: Bootie Brown (1991–2020)
- Website: www.thepharcyde.com

The Pharcyde is an American hip-hop group, formed in South Central Los Angeles in 1991. The original four members of the group are Imani (Emandu Wilcox), Slimkid3 (Trevant Hardson), Bootie Brown (Romye Robinson), and Fatlip (Derrick Stewart). DJ Mark Luv was the group's first disc jockey (DJ), followed by producer J-Swift and then J Dilla.

The group's debut album Bizarre Ride II the Pharcyde (1992), featuring the crossover hit single "Passin' Me By", was highly acclaimed and has gone on to be cited as one of the greatest albums in alternative hip-hop. In 1995 the group released second studio album Labcabincalifornia to further commercial success, featuring successful singles "Drop" and "Runnin'". Labcabincalifornia received mixed critical reception upon its initial release, but has since achieved retrospective critical acclaim. After Fatlip exited the group in 1997, the remaining members released the Pharcyde's follow-up album, Plain Rap (2000). Following the release of Plain Rap, Slimkid3 also departed the group. Imani and Brootie Brown continued on and released Humboldt Beginnings in 2004. The group never again regained its former commercial or critical success.

In 2008, all four members of the group temporarily reunited for performances at that year's Rock the Bells festival. After the 2008 reunion, legal disputes over The Pharcyde name led to various combinations of the four members touring under various names for the next several years. The group reformed as a trio in the 2020s and returned to touring and releasing new music, with Bootie Brown declining to participate.

== History ==
=== 1989–1990: early years ===
Pharcyde group members Slimkid3 from Inglewood, Bootie Brown from Altadena, and Imani from Compton met as dancers in high school in 1989. Dancing was their main ambition as late as 1990, as Imani, Slimkid3 and Romye were in a dance group called "242" alongside their friend Robert Vincent, who later left the group to pursue a career of his own. The dance group was featured in music videos for Michael Jackson's "Remember the Time", Herb Alpert, Tone Loc, and appeared as "Fly Guys" in the TV show In Living Color. Imani and Slimkid3 were childhood friends, who were also good friends with Bootie Brown. Brown knew Fatlip, which was his introduction into the group. Around this time, Imani and Slimkid3 were in a group called "Two for Two", later in a group called "As Is" and then a group called the "Play Brothers", while Bootie Brown was a backup dancer for Fatlip, with Fatlip being the last member to join the group. Bootie Brown recalls that their earlier dancing careers influenced their rapping – "sometimes the way I rap is almost like the way I used to dance". The group met Reggie Andrews, a local high-school music teacher who worked with the Dazz Band and Rick James, and who was a major musical influence on their debut album. The group also met producer J-Swift around this time at SCU (South Central Unit), as he was Reggie Andrews's "star pupil" according to the book Check the Technique. Before group settled on the name "The Pharcyde", they were almost called "The Rappers" and "True Jiggaboo", with the latter serving as inspiration for their interlude "It's Jiggaboo Time".

=== 1991–1994: Bizarre Ride II the Pharcyde ===
The Pharcyde recorded their first demo in 1991, which contained the songs "Passin' Me By", "Ya Mama", and "Officer", and hired a manager, Paul Stewart, who had worked for Cypress Hill, De La Soul, and House of Pain. Mike Ross of Delicious Vinyl heard the demo and the group was signed to the label in the summer of 1991. They were first featured on the British jazz and punk band's Brand New Heavies's album Heavy Rhyme Experience, Vol. 1, on the song "Soul Flower", released by Delicious Vinyl in August 1992. That became their first ever released song.

The group, along with producer J-Swift, recorded their first album Bizarre Ride II the Pharcyde, which was released in November 1992. The album was certified Gold by the RIAA in 1996. The album was highly acclaimed, and became one of the most praised and influential alternative hip-hop albums of the 1990s. Their second single "Passin' Me By" became a Billboard hit, peaking at No. 52 on the Hot 100. The song was later featured in the hit movie Big Daddy and is often critically acclaimed for being one of the best hip-hop songs of all time. The album featured a couple of guest MCs, including Buckwheat (formerly of the hip-hop group The Wascals) on the tracks "On The DL" and "I'm That Type of Nigga". The album consisted a new updated version of "Soul Flower". Problems between the group and producer J-Swift began during the recording of the debut, with infighting and "personality conflicts". That led to J-Swift being dropped as their producer before the album even came out. The album appeared on the best hip-hop albums lists of outlets Rolling Stone, Billboard, and Hip Hop Golden Age.

About the group's sense of humor, Imani was quoted in a 1993 interview saying, "We find humor in things other people don't. Everyday situations. People might look at things around here and say, like, 'Damn!' We say, 'Hah, hah, hah.' We just chill out." Before the success of Bizarre Ride, the group moved to Inglewood, California, where they shared a home dubbed the Pharcyde Manor. Lew of Dirt magazine reports of the Manor, "...you can tell their laid-back style meeting rapid-fire rhyme delivery is a product of the virtual telepathic rapport that only comes from eating, sleeping and breathing under the same roof." The group is widely known for not using profanity and swearing in their works. Bootie Brown explained that Delicious Vinyl pushed them into not using it for radio play aspects, but that the members tried to push it as far as they could go. The four members are known for their different kinds of flows and styles. Fatlip is known for having an unusually deep voice while Bootie Brown is known for having a very light and high voice.

The group released the song "Pork" as a B-side release on a "Passin' Me By" single in March 1993. After the Bizarre Ride album was released, the group began touring with A Tribe Called Quest and De La Soul, culminating with an appearance at the Lollapalooza show in 1994. In 1994, Pharcyde appeared on the Red Hot Organization's compilation album, Stolen Moments: Red Hot + Cool. The album, meant to raise awareness and funds in support of the AIDS epidemic in relation to the African American community, was heralded as "Album of the Year" by Time. They were also featured on the song "Phat-T" on the On Anotha Level album by Anotha Level in April 1994. In November 1994, the Pharcyde appeared with their new song "The Rubbers Song" on the album Stolen Moments: Red Hot + Cool. As well in December 1994, the group did a soundtrack to the film Street Fighter, with the song "Pandemonium".

In a contemporary 2020 review for Pitchfork, Ross Scarano wrote [link added]:

At a time when Los Angeles hip-hop was typified by gangsta rap as heard on Straight Outta Compton and The Chronic, Bizarre Ride is fearlessly quotidian and relatively low-stakes. Even "Officer," their irreverent homage to Public Enemy's "Black Steel in the Hour of Chaos," turns the real peril of operating a motor vehicle as a Black male into a comic escapade.

and went on to conclude [link added]:

... on Bizarre Ride, humor was a way of processing anxiety and pain; a tool to show self-deprecation isn't always the inverse of self-aggrandizement. Like their hero Pryor, it was a way to make themselves the larger-than-life center of attention, to give their struggles and fears their due.

=== 1995–1997: Labcabincalifornia ===
By 1995, the group's producer was the critically acclaimed J Dilla (a.k.a. Jay Dee). In November 1995, the Pharcyde released their second album, Labcabincalifornia. The album was originally going to be called Revelations. Prior to the that, in August 1995, the group released the first single for the album, "Drop" which peaked at number 93 on the Billboard Top 200 and at number 5 for the US Hot Rap Songs. The second single for the album, "Runnin'" released in October 1995, peaked at number 55 on the Billboard Hot 100. The album received mixed to positive reviews upon release, perhaps due to a different musical direction from the light-hearted playfulness of their debut. The album included another big crossover hit, "Runnin'", peaking at No. 35 on the Billboard Hot 100. This single was later featured in the movie 8 Mile, as well as the More Music from 8 Mile soundtrack. Labcabincalifornia featured production from Jay Dee, who handled the majority of the production. Member Slimkid3 has stated that the group met Jay Dee by way of Q-Tip of A Tribe Called Quest, who handed them the tape that contained some of the production that would end up on the LP. This album generated lower sales, not reaching gold status. The group also released a deluxe version of the album which featured additional songs "Just Don't Matter" and "Emerald Butterfly". A third additional song for the deluxe version, "Heart & Soul" only appeared on the Australian version of the album. A music video for the critically acclaimed J Dilla beat song, "Drop" was directed by Spike Jonze. The music video, which was filmed in backwards has gotten a lot of praise and has been called the best music video of all time. Rolling Stone called the music video the 14th best rap music video of all time. Slimkid3 said in a 2020 interview they respected Dilla a lot and said that he was a "calm, cool, collected guy". In the same interview, Tre said that they didn't want to change anything Dilla created, even though Dilla said that they should do it however they wanted and called the Pharcyde his favourite band. During the recording of "Runnin'", Fatlip erased Dilla's unpredictable kick drum track and replaced it with a kick set to a standard time grid while the others were out of the studio. On their return Tre confronted Fatlip about the change leading to a fist fight. J Dilla re-recorded his version of the kick drum which ended up on the album. Both "Runnin'" and "Drop" are often regarded as hip-hop classics today, and some of Dilla's best ever work. The album is today considered a cult classic.

In November 1996, the group appeared with the song "Gotcha Lookin" on the album NFL Jams, which was featured with wide receiver Raghib "Rocket" Ismail.

Problems grew between Fatlip and the other members, especially Slimkid3, after this album resulting in his leaving the group in 1997. His leaving the group also had something to do with his frequent drug use and erratic behaviour, alongside the fact that he wanted to spend time in the studio over performing. In the documentary Cydeways: The Best of the Pharcyde, while the group is performing in shows they still offer their support to Fatlip, telling the crowd that if they support Fatlip on his solo career, then they support the Pharcyde and vice versa.

=== 1997–2000: Plain Rap and Testing the Waters ===
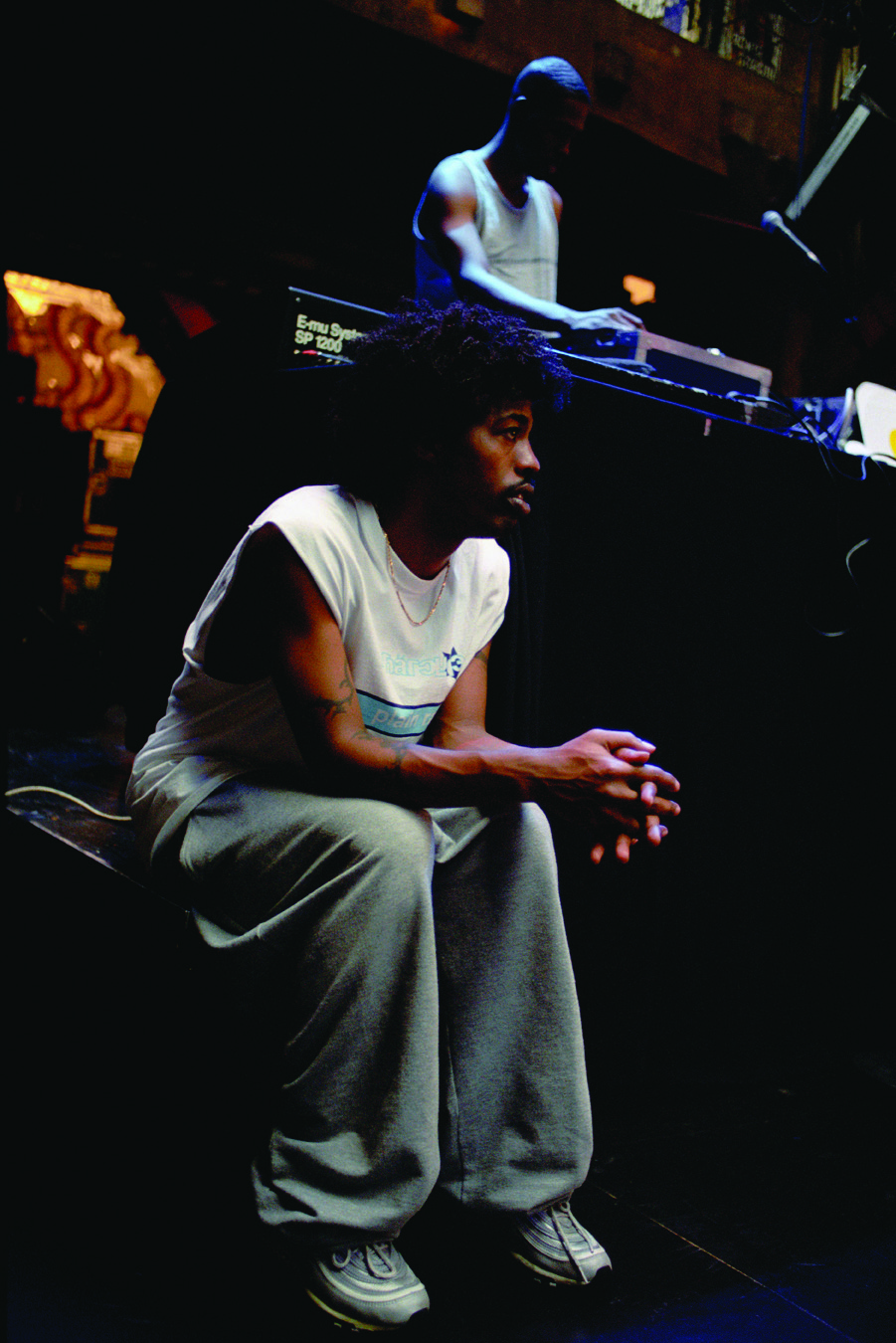
The Pharcyde performing in 1999

The group was largely missing from the hip-hop scene between 1997 and 1999. The group was going to drop an EP titled "Karma" around the time after Fatlip's departure, which was scrapped due to Delicious Vinyl not having the funds available to distribute it. According to an interview with Imani the album was already recorded when it was scrapped, and according to Bootie Brown's Reddit ask-me-anything thread in 2020 he said that the song "Shame", which was performed in a concert in Switzerland in 2011 was "possibly" an unreleased song from the EP. In March 1997, the group appeared with a song in the film "The 6th Man" called "Tasty" and in July 1997, the group appeared with their original song "Keep On" on the Good Burger film soundtrack. In August 1997, the group appeared with the song "Funny Style Pt. 1" on the album Beats & Lyrics. They were also featured on the song "Westcyde 242" on The Lawhouse Experience, Volume One collaborative album in August 1997. In November 1997, the group appeared on a Marshall Arts B-side remix of the Sublime song "Doin' Time" which was released as a single. In September 1998 they released the song "Manifest" on the Beats & Lyrics 2 collaborative album. They were also featured on the song "Bloody Murder (Diamond D Mix)" in 1999 alongside Channel Live, Chuck D, Wise Intelligent, Tragedy Khadafi, Zack de La Rocha and D.B.X. As well in 1999, the Pharcyde were featured on a single with their new song "Technical Difficulties". In November 1999, the Pharcyde were featured on two songs on the V & Legacy album 2000 MG with the songs "Captain Caveman" and "Time – Remix".

The three remaining members returned in March 2000 with an EP titled Chapter One: Testing the Waters, which consisted of six new songs. An unreleased song from that time, "Nasty Habits", featured by Ralph Tresvant and Bobby Brown of Boston R&B group New Edition, didn't release until it appeared on a DJ Spinna mixtape in 2015. The Pharcyde also released the song "Jealousy" on the album Delicious Vinyl Presents Prime Cuts, Volume 1 in February 2000, a month before Testing the Waters came out.

The group released their third full studio album later in 2000 titled Plain Rap. The album received lukewarm reception, although it was praised by some critics and fans. J Dilla had left the group by that time due to being busy on multiple project and instead of having a single sole producer, all three Pharcyde members took turns in being credited for producing the songs alongside J-Swift, who produced Bizarre Ride and Showbiz. They also released a single for the album, "Trust (Remix)" which was a diss track on Fatlip, dissing his solo career, who had released the popular single and EP "What's Up, Fatlip" earlier that year in 2000. In the animated music video for the song, Fatlip is presented as a clown and Slimkid3 is in the video, seen riding away on a phoenix, a reference to his first EP, although Imani claimed that he asked them not to appear. The album consisted of 13 songs, two of which were only available on the European version of the album. Two music videos were released for the album, "Trust (Remix)" and one for the song "Frontline". Imani explained in an interview that the making of the album was hard and that they did not want to release the album, after Tre left the group but that Delicious Vinyl pressured them into it.

Before the album was even fully recorded and before Plain Rap was even released in November 2000, member Slimkid3, left the group to pursue a solo career. At the time, Tre had been vacillating between staying in the group or pursuing his solo career for a few years, even though the Pharcyde's contract with Delicious Vinyl did allow the leeway to do solo projects while still being a part of the group. This did come as a surprise as the song "Trust (Remix)" on the Plain Rap album dissed Fatlip harshly for leaving the group and it was said that "the Pharcyde was 2000 and beyond". About Tre's breakup with the group Imani said "The press tries to make us [Imani and Bootie Brown] out to be the bad guys and Tre to be the good guy. The only people who are really suffering are the fans". Imani also said that Tre's departure was difficult as they had been childhood friends, and that Tre was the main reason for Fatlip's departure, with Tre saying that Fatlip leaving would help the group creatively. Imani also explained that Tre was coming late in studio sessions and "acted like he was Dalai Lama". Imani said that he no longer held any grudge against Fatlip, unlike for Tre, whom he called stubborn in an interview from around 2001. In 2000, Tre released his first EP The Legend of Phoenix and in 2002, Tre released his first solo album titled Liberation.

=== 2000–2004: Almyghty Myghty Pythons and Humboldt Beginnings ===
With only two members remaining, Bootie Brown and Imani continued with the group name, saying that Tre and Fatlip were setbacks. In late 2000, the Pharcyde launched the new hip-hop group Almyghty Myghty Pythons where the Pharcyde and hip-hop group Souls of Mischief collaborated into one. The group released a three-song EP titled AMP in 2002. Imani and Bootie Brown explained in a 2013 interview that the project got ahead of itself and that the hype killed the project, saying that everybody thought an entire album was coming but, instead only a three-song EP came. The project ended due to scheduling conflicts between all members. Opio from Souls of Mischief was featured on the song "The Bomb" on Humboldt Beginnings in 2004.

In January 2001, they released the previously unreleased song "Panty Raid" on the compilation album Cydeways: The Best of The Pharcyde, originally made for Bizarre Ride. The Pharcyde were featured on two songs, "It Ain't Nothing Like" and "Let it Go" on the Rae & Christian album Sleepwalking in February 2001. In 2002, a documentary was directed by Spike Jonze who directed the Drop music video alongside the documentary What's Up Fatlip? following Fatlip two years prior in 2000. The documentary was about the Pharcyde and titled Cydeways: The Best of The Pharcyde. In April 2002, the Pharcyde released the new song "Sticky Green" which appeared on the High Times Presents: T.H.C. (The Hip-Hop Collection, Vol. 1). As well in 2002, they had four different versions of their new song "Can’t Give In" a collaborative single project. In 2002, the Pharcyde were featured with the song "Fresh & Hot" on the Pachecos album Beat Hustlers. As well in 2002, the Pharcyde were featured on the song "Soul Unit" on an EP titled The Soul Unit. In 2002, the Pharcyde released the song "Hard Times" on a single. A remix version of the song appeared on the collaborative EP titled Peacock Series Vol. 1 in 2003. The EP consisted as well of four new Pharcyde songs, "Intro", "Still Got Love", "Bonus Track" and "Outro". As well the EP featured songs from the Soul Unit and the Pitch Hitters, Bootie Brown's other short lived musical project alongside Spaceboy Boogie X also known as Savona Fran. The Pharcyde also appeared on the song "Medieval" which appeared on the Danger Mouse and Jemini collaborative album Ghetto Pop Life in November 2003. In May 2004, the Pharcyde appeared on the Sharkey album, Sharkey's Machine being featured on the song "Snobird". As well in 2004, they also released the two song single "Skammin' / Baby Sit" featuring those two new songs. As well in 2004, the Pharcyde were also credited for appearing on the Super Cat song "Girls Town" from 2004, because the song uses a sample from "Passin' Me By". Imani also released his first solo album, Dosier Vol 1. in 2004.

In July 2004, the Pharcyde finally released their fourth and final to date studio album, Humboldt Beginnings. The album was the first album featuring only Imani and Bootie Brown. The album received even less attention critically and commercially than their last effort, Plain Rap although it was praised by many critics and has gained some cult following. Spaceboy Boogie X became the group's new producer for the album. He alongside Schmooche Cat also made appearances on some songs. The songs "Knew U" and "Illusions" from the album was released as a single beforehand, with "Knew U" getting a music video. The album contained seventeen songs and was released on the group's own independent record label, Chapter One Entertainment, after the guys left Delicious Vinyl after some ongoing drama.

In November 2004, Fatlip appeared with the Pharcyde on a A Tribe Called Quest concert, with many speculations ongoing towards Fatlip rejoining the Pharcyde, as Tre was biggest reason for his departure, but that however did not happen. A compilation of the Pharcyde was released in 2005, titled Sold My Soul: The Remix & Rarity Collection, featuring a number of remixes and rare songs, including the song "Pork".

=== 2004–2020: numerous performances, tours and legal issues ===
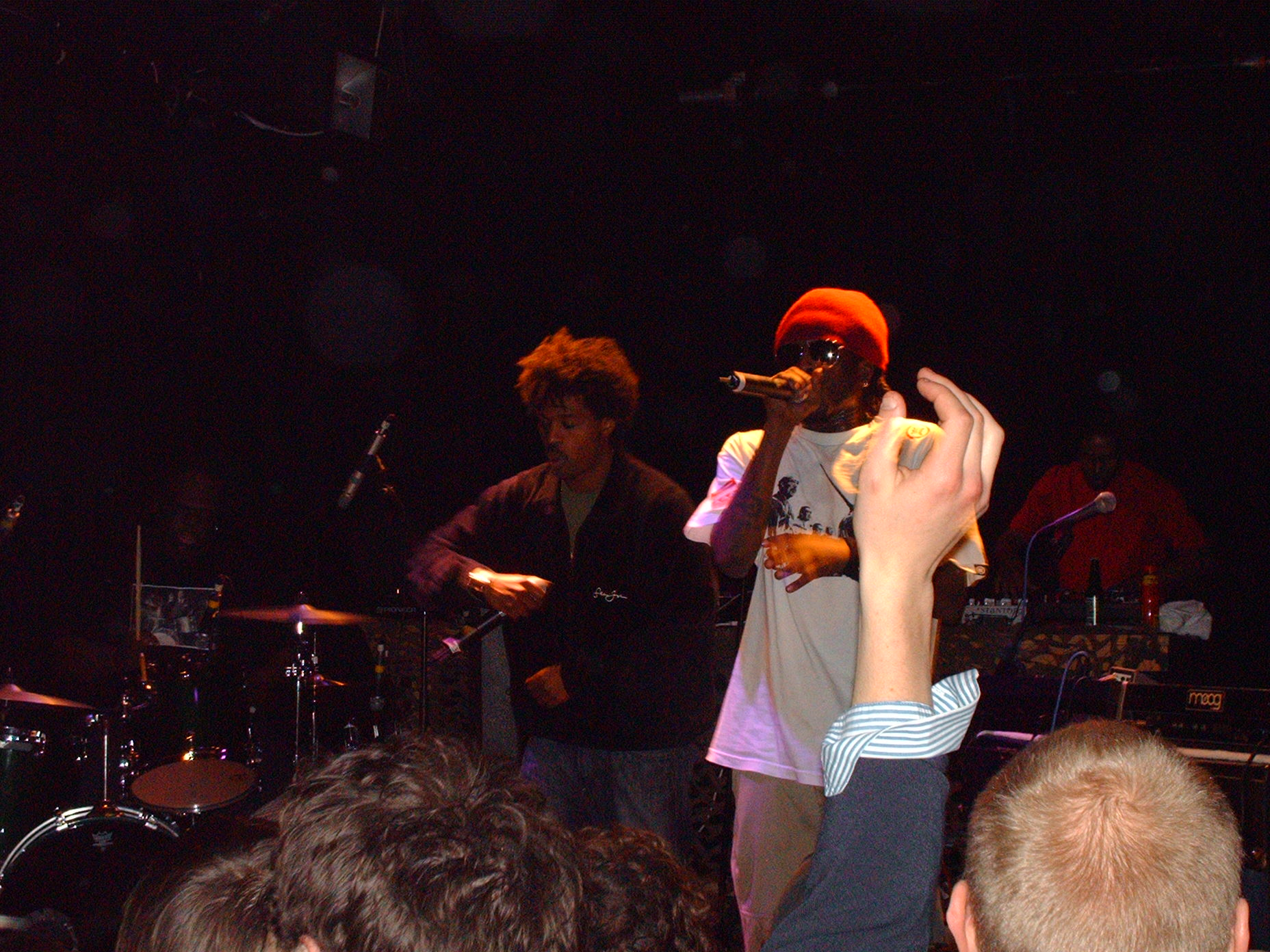
Bootie Brown and Imani performing together in Dublin in 2006

Former member Fatlip released his solo debut in 2005, titled The Loneliest Punk, and Tre Hardson's second full-length solo album "SLIMKID3's Cafe" was released in April 2006. In late 2007, Tre toured with L.A. Latin-funk-hip-hop band Ozomatli on their Winter Tour throughout the United States. In 2005, Bootie Brown made a guest appearance on Gorillaz' single "Dirty Harry", from the album Demon Days and on a remix of another Gorillaz song "Clint Eastwood" in 2006. Fatlip and Slimkid3 made up in the years following Tre's departure, although Tre was the main reason behind Fatlip's departure in the first place. The two released the song "All I Want for Christmas (Is Somebody Else)" and was produced by J-Swift for Delicious Vinyl records in 2007, although it is not formally a Pharcyde song, as the two were not members of the Pharcyde at the time. A big reason for Imani and Brown's departure from Delicious Vinyl was due to the label still working with Fatlip and Tre. In October 2006, Bootie Brown and Imani were featured on the album Too Stoned for TV with their original song "I Smoke". In 2006, the Pharcyde announced the compilation project Eclectic Compassion for a 2007 release. The album was set to feature music across all genres, including rap and jazz, but never came out. Imani's EP Blackdust, originally titled Black Stardust which came out in 2009, started out as what was going to be Eclectic Compassion originally, before being worked as an album and then came out as an EP.

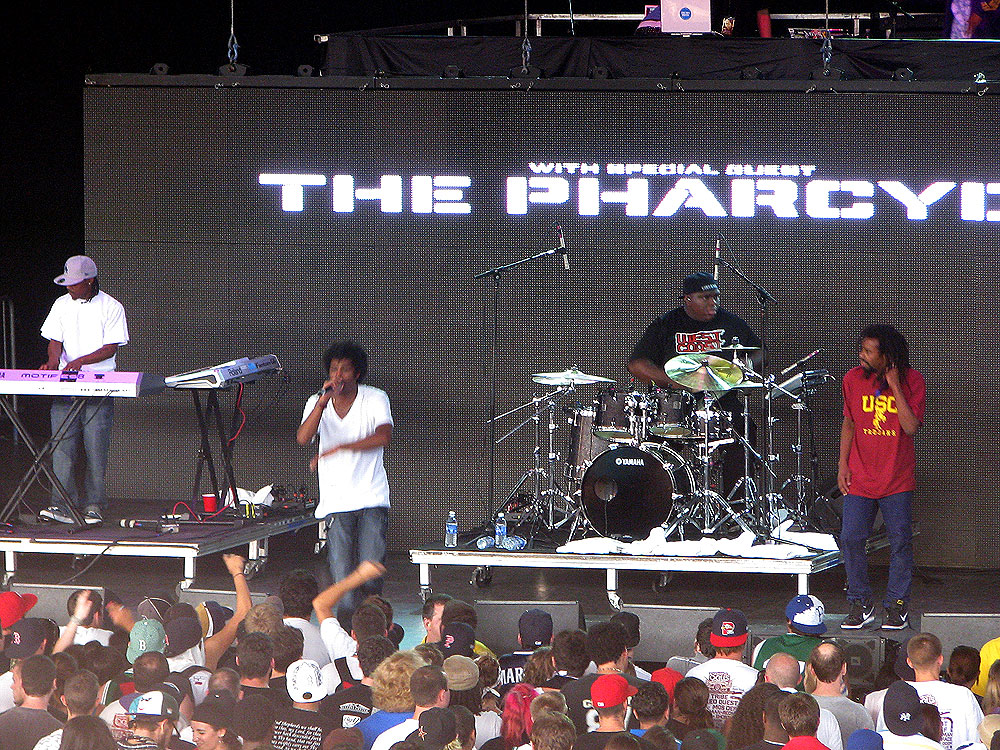
Bootie Brown and Fatlip at the Rock the Bells festival in 2008

From 2008 to 2009 all four members performed together three different times. On April 22, 2008, it was announced that all four members of the Pharcyde would be reuniting for the first time since 1997, for the annual Rock the Bells Festival Series. This was due to all four members getting paid one million dollars for the gig. The first performance was Saturday, July 19 in Chicago. The Pharcyde also reunited at Rhymesayers Entertainment's Soundset '09, Memorial Day Weekend in May 2009, and were the co-headliners of the festival, which was also headlined by Atmosphere. They also headlined at the All Points West Festival in Liberty State Park, NJ on July 31, 2009. That remains the last time all four members came together and performed together. Imani and Bootie Brown toured Australia in February 2009 as part of the Good Vibrations Festival.

The remaining Pharcyde members, Imani and Bootie Brown were featured on the song "Keep On" on the album Enter by DJ Kentaro in April 2007, although the song is not the same "Keep On" song as the Pharcyde recorded for Good Burger. The Pharcyde were also featured on the songs "Don't Be Fooled" and "Back And Forth" on the self-titled album Spaceboy Boogie X in March 2008. They were also featured on the Diesel Compilation: Sickbay Records album in July 2008, with their new songs "Mary Jane" and "Get That Doe". In June 2009, the Pharcyde were featured on the song "Happy Hunting" on an album of the same name by Speech Defect. Later in June 2009, the Pharcyde were featured on the song "Classic" which appeared on the Ancient Astronauts album We Are to Answer. In February 2010, the Pharcyde were featured on the song "Get Down" by Jern Eye, with the song releasing in four different versions on a single titled Get Down. In January 2012, they were featured on the Souls of Mischief rapper Tajai's album Machine Language with the song "Future". In April 2013, they were featured on the song "Firstborn" on the Cookin' Soul and Mc Melodee album My Tape Deck. In July 2013, Imani and Bootie Brown released the song "1st Place" under the Pharcyde name, featuring rapper Moka Only, which became the first self published Pharcyde material since Humboldt Beginnings. In September 2014, they were featured on the song "Hard Days" on the Diamond D album The Diam Piece. At the same time, Bootie Brown was working on his solo musical project Frank Friction. Under that title, he released the album Bird Talk in 2013. Slimkid3 was also working on multiple projects at the time. He and Fatlip released the album Love in 2012, and Tre released an album in 2014 alongside DJ Nu-Mark titled Slimkid3 & DJ Nu-Mark. In 2019 he joined the collaborative project TRDMRK, alongside DJ Nu-Mark and Austin Antoine and released an album of the same name that year.

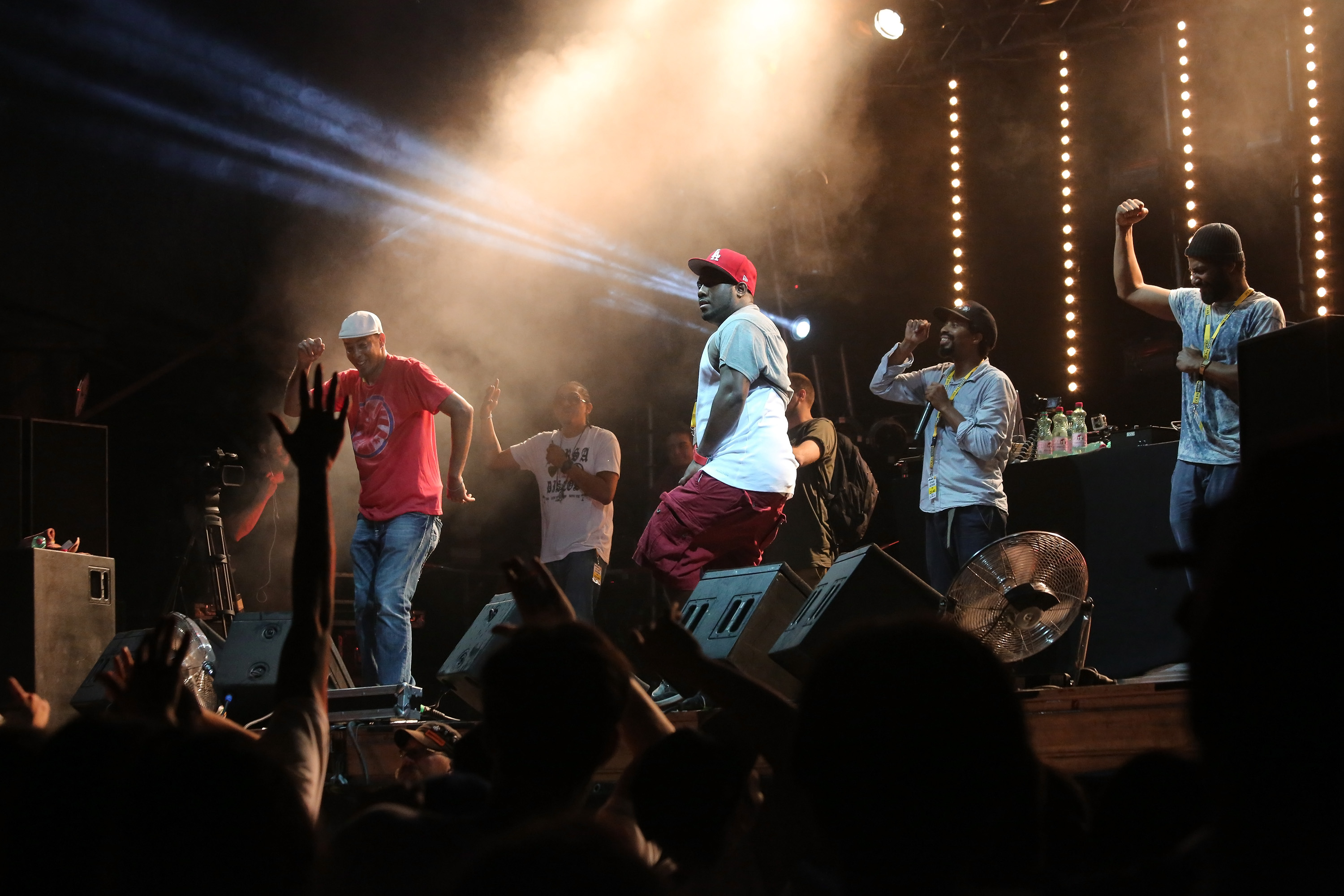
Slimkid3 and Fatlip performing at the Donauinselfest festival in Vienna, Austria, in 2013

In 2012, the Pharcyde's debut Bizarre Ride II the Pharcyde had its twentieth anniversary, and to mark the event Fatlip and Slimkid3 teamed up with the album's producers, J-Swift and L.A. Jay, as well as record label Delicious Vinyl, to play the album in its entirety at a tribute show at The Roxy Theatre in Los Angeles. The performance was intended to be a one-off, but due to an overwhelming success and reception, the two of them began touring the show "Bizarre Ride Live", and, along with MC K-Natural, working on original music under the moniker The Bizarre Ride. In December of that year, the Pharcyde released the Amerigo Gazaway-produced "Still Got Love (Bizarre Tribe Megamix)" garnering significant praise. In 2013, Fatlip and Tre Hardson reunited to perform on 'The Over 30, Dirty Old Men Tour'. Due to Fatlip and Tre's tour the following year, legal battles took place as Imani and Bootie Brown sued Fatlip and Slimkid3 over using the name "The Pharcyde", as the two were no longer members of the group. They won the case in 2013, granting Romye Robinson (Bootie Brown) legal ownership of the Pharcyde name. The year 2015 marked the twentieth anniversary of Labcabincalifornia, resulting in a similar tour through Europe and Japan, with Bootie Brown and Imani touring. The remaining two members of the group continued touring Europe through 2017. In April 2015, Imani and Bootie Brown released the song "Sins" featuring Spaceboy Boogie X, now referred to as SBBX, with a music video released in April 2015. In October 2016, the Pharcyde were featured on Moka Only's album Milky State with the song "Picture Clear". The Pharcyde teamed up with SBBX again in March 2017 for the song "A Way", with both songs being released by The Record Jungle and released limited on vinyl. Bootie Brown and Imani continued doing performances all over America, and even self-released the song "Phantasy" in April 2018 alongside Rozzi Daime. In July 2019, they were featured on the song "Play That Song" on the Connie Price & The Keystones album Lucas High. As well, Fatlip and Slimkid3 continued performing concerts. In January 2020, Imani and Bootie Brown appeared in an interview in the fourth season of the Netflix documentary series Hip-Hop Evolution. In April 2020, the remaining Pharcyde members suspended all of their future concerts because of COVID-19.

The downfall of the Pharcyde was named the 26th (out of 30) worst fall-offs in hip-hop history by Complex magazine in December 2012.

=== Since 2020: revival ===
Imani explained in a 2025 podcast interview that over the years he started to feel weird over doing Fatlip's and Tre's verses on stage when he was doing concerts with Bootie Brown due to the fact that they were "still alive and should be doing these verses themselves with us". In around 2020, Imani attended a Fatlip and Slimkid3 Pharcyde concert and after it, attempted to reunite with the two after not having seen them in a long time. Due to this, he and Romye Robinson (Bootie Brown) had "long talks" about the future of the Pharcyde. Brown felt like going to work with Fatlip and Tre again would be a step back, so he left the group as Fatlip and Slimkid3 rejoined it. In a 2021 Instagram post, Imani explained that Bootie Brown was now the sole owner of all things named after the Pharcyde, and that he didn't consider him a part of the group anymore. This ended a long beef inside the group, with the members even saying that "for years it was Bootie and Imani vs. Fatlip and Tre".

In May 2022, the Pharcyde reunited for the 30th anniversary concert tour of Bizarre Ride II the Pharcyde. Due to the fact that Romye Robinson owned the Pharcyde name, the members decided to call themselves "The Far Side (Formerly Known as the Pharcyde)". In October 2021, a music video was released for the song "Let's Talk" by Lunar Heights and featuring the Pharcyde. The song was eventually released in February 2022 and appeared on the Lunar Heights album G O D P A R T I C L E the same month. In early 2022, the Pharcyde dropped a mixtape, with ten songs recorded by the three members, originally to see if they could rap together again, after they got back together. The mixtape was titled "Imani, Fatlip, & Slimkid3" and became available to the public through Apple Music and Spear of the Nation in February 2022. In May 2022, the Pharcyde were featured on the K-Natural song "Slhick Tawlk", which later appeared on the K-Natural album I Am Ready in 2024, alongside another Pharcyde feature song which came out earlier in 2024, "Feeling Myself". In late 2022, the Pharcyde released the previously unreleased song "My Man", which was originally made to be closing track to Bizarre Ride II the Pharcyde, with a new verse with J-Swift appearing on the track. In October 2023, the Pharcyde were featured on the EMPRS song "Million Miles Away". In November 2023, the Pharcyde released a new song with Spear of the Nation titled "PHR DAH PPL". In 2024, the Pharcyde was featured on the song "Movie Star" with rock band Tropidelic.

In February 2022, it was reported that there would be a reunion of all four members of Pharcyde on Fatlip's upcoming album Torpor, with two Pharcyde tracks confirmed. The song was released on August 1, 2022. "Torpor" was officially released via bandcamp on July 29, 2022, on CD, with the album released on August 23 and on February 3, 2023, on vinyl. The song saw all four members apologising to one another over their past transgressions. When the song released, Bootie Brown, who was in Australia on a tour performing his song "New Gold" with the Gorillaz and Tame Impala. Bootie Brown claimed that he had no part in doing the song, saying that he sent the voice verses used in the song for a different project that he didn't remember what was, with these verses eventually being used on "My Bad", with Brown claiming that he did not approve of the song and that he had nothing to do with it. The song remains the last song featuring all four members of the Pharcyde.

By that time, they started to call themselves either "The Pharcyde Lives" or just "The Pharcyde". In May 2025, the Pharcyde dropped the EP Timeless consisting of four new songs, produced by NBA 2K song track artist, 1999 WRITE THE FUTURE. Rick Rock and JPEGMafia became one of the few new Pharcyde producers working on the EP. This was after the title track "Timeless" had been released as a single a month before, on April 4. In a 2025 interview with Imani and Tre, they said that the group was working on fifth album amongst other project, with the new album set to finish off a trilogy consisting of Bizarre Ride II the Pharcyde and Labcabincalifornia. They said that when they started doing music, they always pictured doing a trilogy of well-known albums and that they were yet to produce the third one. In October 2025, the group was featured on the track "Gang Bang" on the album God Takes Care Of Babies & Fools by rappers Myka9 and Blu.

== Legacy ==
The Pharcyde were described by Steve Huey on AllMusic as an alternative rap group whose first two albums were "eccentric" and "warped". Author Lain Ellis wrote that they "exhibited the kind of relief humor that was popular among the progressive rappers of the 1990s" in their 2010 book Rebels wit Attitude: Subversive Rock Humorists. In their 2022 list of "200 Greatest Rap Albums", Mosi Reeves for Rolling Stone described Bizarre Ride II the Pharcyde as "[bustling] with crunchy soul-jazz, Meters-styled funk, and marijuana-infused psychedelia". Damien Scott wrote for Billboard's 2024 "Best Rap Albums of All Time" review of Bizarre Ride:

Back in the early '90s when N.W.A was dominating the charts with its brand of visceral gangster rap, there didn't seem to be much room for anything else. But else where a movement was brewing. A movement that valued novelty over realism and fun over pathos. A leading project of that movement was the Pharcyde's debut...

In 2025, "Passin' Me By" went platinum with 1,000,000 copies sold, as well as the song going silver in the United Kingdom. The song peaked at number 1 on the US Hot Rap Songs chart when it released as a single in 1993, as well as it peaked at 55 at the US Billboard Hot 100. "Drop" peaked at 5 for the US Hot Rap Songs in 1995 alongside "Runnin'" who also peaked at the number five. Bizarre Ride II the Pharcyde peaked at 23 at the Top R&B/Hip Hop Albums list and Labcabincalifornia peaked at number 17 on the US Top R&B Albums. Plain Rap peaked at 157 for the US Billboard 200 and went 67 for Top R&B/Hip-hop albums. In 2024, Billboard put Bizarre Ride II the Pharcyde on number 90 on the Best Rap Albums of All Time list. "Trust" peaked at number 15 on Hot Rap Tracks. The music video for "Drop" which was filmed in backwards has gotten a lot of praise and has been called the best music video of all time. Rolling Stone called the music video the 14th-best rap music video of all time. In 2023, Billboard named the Pharcyde as the 35th-best rap group of all time.

In 2010, critically acclaimed rapper Kanye West named Bizarre Ride II the Pharcyde his favorite album of all time. On the praise from West, Imani said in a 2017 interview "Just cause Kanye came out and said, 'Pharcyde is my favorite record,' people heard that like, 'shit, I like Kanye, he said Pharcyde is his favorite shit, I must like 'em too'. They’re not experiencing the Pharcyde thing for themselves." The 2013 Pusha T and Kendrick Lamar song "Nosetalgia" sampled the Pharcyde's "Pack the Pipe". In 2022, Imani said in an interview that rapper Ice Cube was talking about the Pharcyde on his 2012 album Jackin' for Beats. In 2023, rapper Tyler, the Creator said in an interview that he just started diving into the Pharcyde and said that their music "sounded like the idea of California". The 2023 Kanye West and Ty Dolla Sign song "Back to Me" sampled "Runnin'". In January 2025, Ice Cube said in an interview that Tyler the Creator reminded him of the Pharcyde, saying that he salutes the way they stayed with their own styles. In 2025, Imani said in an interview with Big Boy that Tupac Shakur, also known as 2Pac, told the Pharcyde once that "they were greater than they realised and that their record company was not being truthful with them".

Songs by the Pharcyde have appeared in multiple films and TV shows. "Passin' Me By" was featured in the games NBA 2K9 and Aggressive Inline. The song appeared during the opening credits of the Adam Sandler film Big Daddy. As well in the movies Fast X and mid90s, and TV shows Atlanta, Atypical, Friends from College, Last Chance U: Basketball and Kenan. The song "Runnin'" is featured in the Eminem film 8 Mile, in the opening and closing scenes in the comedy Tag, and in the movie The Sitter, as well in TV shows Entourage and New York Undercover. "Ya Mama" appeared in the TV show Black-ish, "Otha Fish" appeared in the film CB4, "Oh Shit" appeared in The Gentlemen, Thanksgiving, Killing It, Reboot, Life & Beth, Whiskey Tango Foxtrot, Get Hard, Ballers, 21 & Over and Above the Rim, "The Bomb" appeared in Veronica Mars and "4 Better or 4 Worse" appeared in Rectify.

== Discography ==
=== Studio albums ===
List of studio albums, with selected chart positions
Title	Album details	Peak chart positions			Certifications
Title	Album details	US	US R&B	UK	Certifications
Bizarre Ride II the Pharcyde	Released: November 24, 1992; Label: Delicious Vinyl; Formats: LP, CD, cassette	75	23	58	RIAA: Gold; BPI: Silver
Labcabincalifornia	Released: November 14, 1995; Label: Delicious Vinyl, Capitol Records; Formats: LP, CD, cassette	37	17	46	
Plain Rap	Released: November 7, 2000; Label: Delicious Vinyl; Formats: LP, CD, cassette	157	67	—	
Humboldt Beginnings	Released: July 13, 2004; Label: Chapter One; Formats: LP, CD	—	—	—	
"—" denotes a recording that did not chart or was not released in that territory.

=== Compilations ===
List of compilation albums
Title	Album details
Cydeways: The Best of the Pharcyde	Released: January 16, 2001; Label: Rhino
Instrumentals	Released: September 13, 2005; Label: Delicious Vinyl
Sold My Soul: The Remix & Rarity Collection	Released: November 8, 2005; Label: Funky Chemist

=== EPs and mixtapes ===
List of EPs
Title	Release details
Chapter One: Testing the Waters	Released: February 15, 2000; Label: Chapter One
AMP (as Almyghty Myghty Pythons)	Released: 2002; Label: Hiero Imperium
Imani, Fatlip, & Slimkid3 (mixtape)	Released: February 4, 2022; Label: Spearitwurx
Timeless	Released: May 2, 2025; Label: 88rising

=== Singles ===
List of singles, with selected chart positions, showing year released and album name
Title	Year	Peak chart positions						Certifications	Album
Title	Year	US	US Dance Sales	US R&B	US Rap	NZ	UK	Certifications	Album
"Ya Mama"	1992	—	—	— (Note: "Ya Mama" did not enter the Hot R&B/Hip-Hop Songs chart, but peaked at number six on the Bubbling Under R&B/Hip-Hop Singles chart.)	—	—	—		Bizarre Ride II the Pharcyde
"Passin' Me By"	1993	52	6	28	1	—	55	RIAA: Platinum; BPI: Silver	Bizarre Ride II the Pharcyde
"4 Better or 4 Worse"	1993	—	—	—	—	—	—		Bizarre Ride II the Pharcyde
"Otha Fish"	1993	—	35	—	—	—	—		Bizarre Ride II the Pharcyde
"Pandemonium"	1994	—	—	—	—	—	—		Street Fighter (soundtrack)
"Runnin'"	1995	55	—	35	5	34	36	RIAA: Gold; BPI: Silver	Labcabincalifornia
"Drop"	1996	93	4	73	5	—	—		Labcabincalifornia
"She Said"	1996	—	46	— (Note: "She Said" did not enter the Hot R&B/Hip-Hop Songs chart, but peaked at number four on the Bubbling Under R&B/Hip-Hop Singles chart.)	30	—	51		Labcabincalifornia
"Trust"	2000	—	—	— (Note: "Trust" did not enter the Hot R&B/Hip-Hop Songs chart, but peaked at number three on the Bubbling Under R&B/Hip-Hop Singles chart.)	15	—	—		Plain Rap
"Frontline"	2000	—	—	—	—	—	—		Plain Rap
"Skammin' / Baby Sit"	2004	—	—	—	—	—	—		—
"Knew U"	2004	—	—	—	—	—	—		Humboldt Beginnings
"Illusions"	2004	—	—	—	—	—	—		Humboldt Beginnings
"1st place"	2013	—	—	—	—	—	—		—
"Sins"	2015	—	—	—	—	—	—		—
"A Way"	2017	—	—	—	—	—	—		—
"Phantasy"	2018	—	—	—	—	—	—		—
"My Bad"	2022	—	—	—	—	—	—		Torpor
"My Man"	2022	—	—	—	—	—	—		—
"Timeless"	2025	—	—	—	—	—	—		Timeless (EP)
"—" denotes a recording that did not chart or was not released in that territory.

=== Guest appearances ===
Song	Year	Album
"Soul Flower"	1992	Heavy Rhyme Experience, Vol. 1 with Brand New Heavies
"Phat-T"	1994	On Anotha Level with Anotha Level
"The Rubbers Song"	1994	Stolen Moments: Red Hot + Cool
"Gotcha Lookin"	1996	NFL Jams
"Doin' Time" (Remix)	1996	Sublime with Sublime
"Tasty"	1997	The 6th Man (soundtrack)
"Keep On"	1997	Good Burger (soundtrack)
"Funny Style Pt. 1"	1997	Beats & Lyrics
"Westcyde 242"	1997	The Lawhouse Experience, Volume One
"Manifest"	1998	Beats & Lyrics 2 with Schmooche Cat
"Bloody Murder (Diamond D Mix)"	1999	Bloody Murder with Channel Live, Chuck D, Wise Intelligent, Tragedy and Zack
"Technical Difficulties"	1999	Technical Difficulties / Underground Sound
"Captain Caveman"	1999	2000 Mg
"Time – Remix"	1999	2000 Mg
"Jealousy"	2000	Prime Cuts
"It Ain't Nothing Like"	2001	Sleepwalking with Rae & Christian
"Let It Go"	2001	Sleepwalking with Rae & Christian
"Sticky Green"	2002	High Times Presents: T.H.C.
"Can't Give In"	2002	Can't Give In / Food for Thought
"Hard Times"	2002	Hard Times / Verbal Murder
"Fresh & Hot"	2002	Beat Hustlers with Pachecos
"Soul Unit"	2002	The Soul Unit
"Intro"	2003	Peacock Series Vol. 1
"Still Got Love"	2003	Peacock Series Vol. 1
"Bonus Track"	2003	Peacock Series Vol. 1
"Outro"	2003	Peacock Series Vol. 1
"Medieval"	2003	Ghetto Pop Life with Danger Mouse and Jemini the Gifted One
"Girls Town"	2004	Girls Town / Get Impeccable with Super Cat
"Snobird"	2004	Sharkey's Machine with Sharkey
"I Smoke"	2006	Too Stoned for TV
"Keep On"	2007	Enter with DJ Kentaro
"Don't Be Fooled"	2008	Sanova Fran with Spaceboy Boogie X
"Back And Forth"	2008	Sanova Fran with Spaceboy Boogie X
"Mary Jane"	2008	Diesel Compilation: Stickbay Records with Soul Unit and Schmooche Cat
"Get That Doe"	2008	Diesel Compilation: Stickbay Records with Soul Unit and Schmooche Cat
"Happy Hunting"	2009	Happy Hunting with Speech Defect
"Classic"	2009	We Are Here to Answer with Ancient Astronauts
"Get Down"	2010	"Get Down" Official Pharcyde Remix / CALI – SINGLE with Jern Eye
"Future"	2012	Machine Language with Tajai
"Firstborn"	2013	My Tape Deck with Cookin' Soul, Mc Melodee and Feliciana
"Hard Days"	2014	The Diam Piece with Diamond D
"Picture Clear"	2016	Milky State with Moka Only
"Play That Song"	2019	Lucas High with Connie Price & the Keystones
"Let's Talk"	2022	G O D P A R T I C L E with Lunar Heights
"Slhick Tawlk"	2022	I Am Ready with K-Natural (2024)
"Million Miles Away"	2023	EMPEREURS with EMPRS
"Feeling Myself"	2024	I Am Ready with K-Natural (2024)
"Movie Star"	2024	Royal Grove with Tropidelic
"Gang Bang"	2025	God Takes Care Of Babies & Fools by Myka 9 and Blu

=== Music videos ===
Title	Year	Album
"Ya Mama"	1992	Bizarre Ride II the Pharcyde
"Passin' Me By"	1993	Bizarre Ride II the Pharcyde
"4 Better or 4 Worse"	1993	Bizarre Ride II the Pharcyde
"Otha Fish"	1993	Bizarre Ride II the Pharcyde
"It's Jiggaboo Time"	1993	Bizarre Ride II the Pharcyde
"Pandemonium"	1994	Street Fighter (1994 film)
"Runnin'"	1995	Labcabincalifornia
"Drop"	1995	Labcabincalifornia
"She Said"	1996	Labcabincalifornia
"She Said (Jay-Dee Remix)"	1996	Cydeways: The Best of the Pharcyde
"Trust (Remix)"	2000	Plain Rap
"Frontline"	2000	Plain Rap
"Knew U"	2004	Humboldt Beginnings
"Sins"	2015	Sins
"Let's Talk"	2021	G O D P A R T I C L E
"Million Miles Away"	2023	EMPEREURS
"Timeless"	2025	Timeless (EP)
