= Bizarre Ride II the Pharcyde =

Studio album by the Pharcyde
- Released: November 24, 1992
- Recorded: 1991–1992
- Studios: Hollywood Sound, Hollywood
- Genres: Alternative hip-hop; jazz rap; boom bap
- Length: 56:41
- Label: Delicious Vinyl
- Producers: J-Swift; L.A. Jay; SlimKid3

The Pharcyde chronology
Bizarre Ride II the Pharcyde (1992)	Labcabincalifornia (1995)

Singles from Bizarre Ride II the Pharcyde
- 1. "Ya Mama" Released: June 1992; 2. "Passin' Me By" Released: March 18, 1993; 3. "4 Better or 4 Worse" Released: 1993; 4. "Otha Fish" Released: 1993

Bizarre Ride II the Pharcyde is the debut album by the American hip-hop group the Pharcyde. It was released on November 24, 1992, through Delicious Vinyl. The album was produced by J-Swift, and features Buckwheat of the Wascals on two tracks. In the years after its release, Bizarre Ride has been hailed by music critics and alternative hip-hop fans as a classic hip-hop album and has appeared in numerous publications' "best albums" lists.

Released during the dominant gangsta rap era of West Coast hip-hop, Bizarre Ride was described as "refreshing" due to its playful, light-hearted humor and lush, jazzy production. Along with albums such as To Whom It May Concern... by Freestyle Fellowship, and I Wish My Brother George Was Here by Del tha Funkee Homosapien, Bizarre Ride helped establish a new alternative scene on the West Coast, followed by artists such as Hieroglyphics, the Coup and Jurassic 5. Despite its wide critical acclaim, the album produced only moderate sales, peaking at No. 75 on the Billboard 200 album chart in 1993. However, on the strength of the second single, "Passin' Me By", the album was certified gold in sales by the Recording Industry Association of America (RIAA) on March 28, 1996.

== Conception ==
=== Background ===
High school friends "Slimkid3" (Tre Hardson), "Imani" (Emandu Wilcox) and "Bootie Brown" (Romye Robinson) began their career in the entertainment industry as dancers and choreographers under the moniker "Two For Two", making numerous appearances in music videos. Their most notable exposure came with a short stint on the television show In Living Color. While working on the show, the group met their future manager Suave, then a road manager for Candyman and Tone Loc. The trio met Derrick "Fatlip" Stewart and producer John "J-Swift" Martinez at an after-school music program called South Central Unit. The program's teacher, Reggie Andrews, taught the group about essential elements of the music industry, and later oversaw the group's writing and recording sessions. While attending SCU, the group recorded their first demo tape, which included the track "Ya Mama". In 1991, the group signed a deal with Delicious Vinyl Records, following a performance of the track "Ya Mama" at an artist showcase. Soon after, the group made their first notable appearance, with the track "Soul Flower", released on the Heavy Rhyme Experience album by the Brand New Heavies.

=== Recording ===
The four emcees, along with producer J-Swift, began recording Bizarre Ride II the Pharcyde in late 1991. The first sessions were held at Paramount Recording Studios, which the group disliked as they found it too large for their needs. Additionally, they had to leave frequently because renting the studio full-time was too costly. To solve this, Delicious Vinyl's founder and the album's executive producer Mike Ross rented a smaller studio, Hollywood Sounds, where the group could work on the album without interruptions. J-Swift produced 10 songs and five interludes—15 of the album's 16 tracks. Before the completion of the album, Swift had a falling-out with the group over internal problems. He claimed that he was not properly compensated for his work, and that the other group members had tried to take production credit, when he had crafted all the beats himself. Upon leaving, he recommended them a school friend, John "L.A. Jay" Barnes. L.A. Jay helped the group with the production on the final song, "Otha Fish".

Accounts differ on the duration of the recording process, with Slimkid3 saying it took nine months, while Mike Ross says it was six or seven months. The group left a song off the album called "My Man", due to it being unfinished and the label deciding to wrap the album because of inner group conflicts. According to Bootie Brown, the group intended to record four or five other songs for the album. "It wasn't a complete project", says the artist.

== Music ==
=== Lyrical content ===
Much of the album's acclaim was due to the eccentric, comedic content provided by the four emcees, who were described as a "pack of class clowns set loose in a studio" by Rolling Stone. The album's wacky storytelling and light-hearted playfulness provided an alternative to the pessimistic, hardcore hip-hop that had ruled the scene at the time. Due to its light lyrical content, the album has been described as an extension of the "Daisy Age", established by De La Soul and the Native Tongues Posse. AllMusic described the group's rapping as "amazing", and stated, "The L.A.-based quartet introduced listeners to an uproarious vision of earthy hip-hop informed by P-Funk silliness and an everybody-on-the-mic street-corner atmosphere that highlights the incredible rapping skills of each member." Instead of focusing on the troubles of the inner city, the quartet use their verses to provide humorous first-person narratives, with varying topics. On the album opener "Oh Shit", SlimKid, Imani and Fatlip trade embarrassing tales about drunken antics, unusual sex partners and transsexuals. SlimKid, Imani and guest rapper Buckwheat use the song "On the DL" to vent personal stories that they'd like to be kept "on the down-low", with topics including masturbation and murder. On the single "4 Better or 4 Worse", Fatlip dedicates an entire verse to prank calling, in which the rapper spouts insane and psychotic threats while a confused female victim continually threatens to call the police. The group's debut single "Ya Mama", described by the Rolling Stone Album Guide as the album's most memorable track, calling it a "marathon game of the dozens", sees the four rappers trading comical insults towards each other's mothers.

While the majority of the album has a focus on comedic stories, the song "Officer" touches on the topic of racial profiling. "Otha Fish" finds the group rising up and moving on from their past hang-ups as described in the previous track, "Passin' Me By", the album's hit single. On the song, the four recount heartbreaking tales of school-boy crushes that had eluded them.

=== Production ===
Bizarre Ride also featured the acclaimed production work of J-Swift, who provides the album with a lush, jazzy soundscape through use of live instrumentation and sampling. Swift relied on a large number of samples, by artists including James Brown, Donald Byrd, Sly & the Family Stone, the Meters, Quincy Jones, Jimi Hendrix, Roy Ayers and Marvin Gaye. Aside from the samples, Swift also provided piano, bass and rhodes on the album, and fellow producer JMD provided drum arrangements.

== Release ==
Bizarre Ride II the Pharcyde was released on November 24, 1992, through Delicious Vinyl. The album had a moderate commercial success; it debuted at number 175 on the Billboard 200 chart, eventually peaking at number 75. It was certified gold by Recording Industry Association of America in 1996, for selling 500,000 copies in the US.

In 2017, to celebrate its 25th anniversary, Craft Recordings re-released Bizarre Ride II the Pharcyde in multiple formats: vinyl, cassette, a double CD with bonus materials, and a five-disc vinyl set that included the album's singles.

=== Singles ===
Bizarre Ride II the Pharcyde featured four singles, all of which were accompanied by music videos. The group's debut single, "Ya Mama", originally from their 1991 demo, was released by Delicious Vinyl in June 1992, along with a low-budget music video. Though the song landed the group their record deal, it failed to reach any Billboard singles chart. Their first major exposure came with the release of the album's second single, "Passin' Me By". Utilizing a sample from Quincy Jones' "Summer in the City", the song became the group's biggest crossover hit, peaking at No. 52 on the Billboard Hot 100 chart, and No. 1 on the Hot Rap Singles chart. The song was later featured on the soundtrack to, and in Adam Sandler's 1999 film Big Daddy. The song is now considered a classic hip-hop single. The album's third single, "4 Better or 4 Worse", was released in mid-1993, and featured the stoner song "Pack the Pipe" and the throwback track "Return of the B-Boy" as its B-Side. The single did not reach any Billboard chart. The final single, the SlimKid solo track "Otha Fish", was released in late 1993. The song became the second charting single from the album, though not as highly placed as "Passing Me By", reaching only the Hot Dance Music/Maxi-Singles Sales chart. In 2012, all four singles were re-released in a limited edition box set.

A number of tracks from the album were later remixed. "Ya Mama", "Soul Flower", "Otha Fish", and "Passing Me By" all featured a number of remixes, which were later included on the 2005 Pharcyde compilation album Sold My Soul: The Remix & Rarity Collection.

== Critical reception ==
Professional ratings
Review scores
Source	Rating
Entertainment Weekly	B
The Philadelphia Inquirer	4/4 stars
Q	4/5 stars
Select	4/5
The Source	3.5/5 stars

At the time of its release, Bizarre Ride II the Pharcyde received mostly positive reviews. Entertainment Weekly's James Bernard called the album a "freewheeling hip-hop cabaret", commending it for being humorous. Similarly, a reviewer for Q magazine described the album as a combination of De La Soul's "daffy [...] invention" and the accessible humor of the Fresh Prince. Dennis Romero of The Philadelphia Inquirer also drew comparisons to De La Soul and compared the Pharcyde to the comedian Richard Pryor. "These rappers become instruments as they perform a wide range of styles", wrote the journalist. Adam Higginbotham of Select highlighted the variety of styles employed on the album. Summarizing the album, he wrote: "They are deeply unconventional and stupid in the best possible way". Describing the Pharcyde as an "unholy amalgam and simultaneous parody of America's black entertainers", David Bennun of Melody Maker praised the album. "[T]hey rap like they were a vocal harmony group who learned to talk instead of sing", he wrote.

The Source's Brett Johnson saw the Pharcyde as a combination of the "off-beat charm" of De La Soul and the "intense enthusiasm and energy" of Leaders of the New School. He commended the instrumentals, which he described as a blend of "soulful pianos and organs" with "head-nodding basslines", as well as the group's vocal performance, but also thought the group might struggle to gain acceptance among the hardcore hip-hop audience. "The question many will have to answer for themselves is whether a trip to the Pharcyde is a step backwards or a leap into the future?", concluded the writer. The Source later named it one of the best albums of 1993. NME thought the Pharcyde created "their own sonic Utopia, a world that's by turns riotously funny, twisted, mostly right-on and brooding with noir-ish cool". The magazine placed Bizarre Ride II the Pharcyde at number 39 on their 1993 year-end list of best albums, calling it a "cartoon-strip of blunt-smoking antics, sexual innuendo and unashamed political incorrectness, crammed with infectious funky beats". Charles Aaron, in his review for Spin, named Bizarre Ride II the Pharcyde "one of the most musically vivid hip-hop records of the year", but added that "it's hard to hype a group so confused and amused about itself". Rolling Stone placed the album on their list of the best recordings on 1993, calling it a "fusion of punchy rhythm and loopy rhyme".

=== Retrospective ===
Retrospective reviews
Review scores
Source	Rating
AllMusic	5/5 stars
The Encyclopedia of Popular Music	4/5 stars
Pitchfork	9.3/10
RapReviews	9.5/10
Record Collector	5/5 stars
The Rolling Stone Album Guide	4/5 stars

In the years since its release, numerous publications have recognized Bizarre Ride II the Pharcyde as a hip-hop classic. AllMusic's John Bush hailed the album for the "amazing rapping and gifted productions", "easily some of the tightest and most inventive of any hip-hop record of the era", but thought it might be challenging for new listeners due to a lack of catchy elements. Colin Larkin described it as a "multi-layered comic masterpiece" in The Encyclopedia of Popular Music. Ross Scarano, in his review for Pitchfork, called it "one of the most boisterous and creative acts of adolescent knuckleheadedness and confession in hip-hop history". Comparing it to other contemporaneous West Coast hip-hop albums, he called Bizarre Ride II the Pharcyde "fearlessly quotidian and relatively low-stakes", adding that the group used humor to deal with anxiety and pain. RapReviews's Jordan Selbo thought the group employs "style and a viewpoint deliciously and profoundly contradictory", "[s]imultaneously subtle and brazen, overtly celebratory yet deeply dark and twisted, both ephemeral and timeless in scope". He viewed Bizarre Ride II the Pharcyde as a historic document that captures the experience of Black people in the US. Paul Bowler of Record Collector praised the album for its uniqueness, for being "a rare but joyous example of rap without ego".

Various publications placed Bizarre Ride II the Pharcyde on their best-of lists. Rolling Stone added it to the 2020 edition of their The 500 Greatest Albums of All Time list. It was featured in the 2005 book 1001 Albums You Must Hear Before You Die, in which its author Robert Dimery called it "a true classic", commending the trio for "keep[ing] it original" and J-Swift for bringing "greater depth and a lush, soulful sound".

=== Accolades ===
(*) designates lists which are unordered.

Publication	Country	Accolade	Year	Rank
About.com	USA	The Greatest Hip-Hop Albums of all Time	2006	73
About.com	USA	Best Rap Albums of 1992	2006	4
Billboard	USA	Best Rap Albums of All Time	2024	90
Ego Trip	USA	Hip Hop's 25 Greatest Albums by Year 1980–1998	1999	6
Paste	USA	The Greatest Debut Albums of the 1990s	2023	21
Pitchfork	USA	Top 100 Favorite Records of the 1990s	2003	80
Robert Dimery	USA	1001 Albums You Must Hear Before You Die	2005	*
Rolling Stone	USA	The 500 Greatest Albums of All Time	2020	482
Rolling Stone	USA	Chris Rock's Top 25 Hip-Hop Albums	2005	5
The Source	USA	100 Best Rap Albums	1998	*

== Legacy ==
Released at the time when West Coast was dominated by gangsta rap of N.W.A and G-funk sound of Dr. Dre and Snoop Dogg, Bizarre Ride II the Pharcyde offered an alternative to these styles, while embracing a jazz-influenced style of East Coast groups like A Tribe Called Quest. Despite its moderate commercial success, the album was hailed as a hip-hop classic by both journalists and listeners. Kanye West named Bizarre Ride II the Pharcyde his favorite album. The album was also a formative influence on the Beta Band, whose Steve Mason also cites it as a favourite.

== Track listing ==
All tracks produced by J-Swift, except "Otha Fish", produced by L.A. Jay and SlimKid3. Track listing and production information is taken from the album's liner notes.

No.	Title	Writer(s)	Performer(s)	Length
1.	"4 Better or 4 Worse" (Interlude)	Juan Martinez	Instrumental	0:38
2.	"Oh Shit"	Martinez; Trevant Hardson; Emandu Wilcox; Derrick Stewart	Slimkid3; Imani; Fatlip	4:30
3.	"It's Jiggaboo Time" (Skit)	Stewart; Wilcox; Rahsaan Jackson; Hardson; Romye Robinson; Martinez	Skit	1:28
4.	"4 Better or 4 Worse"	Hardson; Wilcox; Stewart; Martinez	Slimkid3; Imani; Fatlip	5:07
5.	"I'm That Type of Nigga"	Stewart; Wilcox; Jackson; Hardson; Robinson; Martinez	Fatlip; Imani; Buckwheat; Slimkid3; Bootie Brown	5:21
6.	"If I Were President" (Skit)	Stewart; Wilcox; Hardson; Robinson; Martinez	Skit	1:06
7.	"Soul Flower" (Remix)	Jan Kincaid; Simon Bartholomew; Andrew Levy; Robinson; Wilcox; Hardson; Stewart	Bootie Brown; Imani; Slimkid3; Fatlip	4:23
8.	"On the DL"	Hardson; Jackson; Wilcox; Martinez	Slimkid3; Buckwheat; Imani	4:32
9.	"Pack the Pipe" (Interlude)	Martinez	Instrumental	0:25
10.	"Officer"	Stewart; Robinson; Wilcox; Hardson; Martinez	Fatlip; Bootie Brown; Imani; Slimkid3	4:04
11.	"Ya Mama"	Stewart; Robinson; Wilcox; Hardson; Martinez	Fatlip; Bootie Brown; Imani; Slimkid3	4:22
12.	"Passin' Me By"	Robinson; Hardson; Wilcox; Stewart; Martinez	Bootie Brown; Slimkid3; Imani; Fatlip	5:01
13.	"Otha Fish"	Hardson; John Barnes III; Robinson	Slimkid3	5:23
14.	"Quinton's on the Way" (Skit)	Hardson; Robinson; Stewart; Wilcox; Quinton Howze; Martinez	Skit	2:10
15.	"Pack the Pipe"	Hardson; Robinson; Stewart; Wilcox; Howze; Martinez	Slimkid3; Bootie Brown; Fatlip; Imani; Quinton	5:08
16.	"Return of the B-Boy"	Robinson; Wilcox; Hardson; Stewart; Martinez	Bootie Brown; Imani; Slimkid3; Fatlip	3:32
Total length:				56:41

== Personnel ==
All information is taken from the album's liner notes.

- The Pharcyde – Co-Producer, Background Vocals, Creative Direction
- Fatlip – Lead Vocals, Scratching
- SlimKid 3 – Lead Vocals, Producer
- Imani – Lead Vocals
- Bootie Brown – Lead Vocals
- J-Swift – Producer, Piano, Bass, Rhodes, Background Vocals, Scratching
- L.A. Jay – Producer
- Buckwheat – Vocals
- Quinton – Vocals
- Rahsaan – Background Vocals
- Greg Padilla – Background Vocals
- Brandon Padilla – Background Vocals
- Cedra Walton – Background Vocals
- Eric Sarafin – Engineer, Mix Engineer
- Joe Primeau – Mix Engineer
- Al Phillips – Additional Engineer
- Doug Boehm – Additional Engineer
- James Mansfield – Additional Engineer
- Jim Ervin – Additional Engineer
- JMD – Drums
- Michael Ross – Executive Producer
- Lamarr Algee – A&R
- Leslie Cooney – A&R Coordinator, Background Vocals
- PMP Mgt. – Management
- Paul Stewart – Management
- Street Knowledge – Management
- Slick K2S/ Fuct – Art Direction, Artwork
- Mark Heimback-Nielsen – Package Design
- Block – Photography

== Charts ==
=== Album ===
Year	Album	Chart positions		
Year	Album	Billboard 200	Top R&B/Hip-Hop Albums	Top Heatseekers
1993	Bizarre Ride II the Pharcyde	75	23	3

=== Singles ===
Year	Song	Chart positions			
Year	Song	Billboard Hot 100	Hot R&B/Hip-Hop Singles & Tracks	Hot Rap Singles	Hot Dance Music/Maxi-Singles Sales
1993	"Passing Me By"	52	28	1	6
1993	"Otha Fish"	—	—	—	35

== Certifications ==
Region	Certification	Certified units/sales
United Kingdom (BPI)	Silver	60,000^{‡}
United States (RIAA)	Gold	500,000^{^}
^{^} Shipments figures based on certification alone.^{‡} Sales+streaming figures based on certification alone.
