= Passin' Me By =

Single by the Pharcyde

from the album Bizarre Ride II the Pharcyde and Amongst Friends: Original Motion Picture Soundtrack
- B-side: "Pork"
- Released: March 18, 1993
- Recorded: 1991 at Hollywood :v Sounds, California
- Genre: Progressive rap; jazz rap
- Length: 5:03
- Label: Delicious Vinyl
- Songwriters: Romye Robinson; Trevant Hardson; Emandu Wilcox; Derrick Stewart; Juan Martinez-Luis
- Producers: J-Swift; Additional Production and Remix: L.A. Jay

The Pharcyde singles chronology
"Ya Mama" (1992)	"Passin' Me By" (1993)	"4 Better or 4 Worse" (1993)

Audio sample
- file; help

Music video
- "Passin' Me By" on YouTube

"Passin' Me By" is a song by American hip-hop group the Pharcyde, released on March 18, 1993, through Delicious Vinyl Records. The song was the second single released from the group's 1992 debut album Bizarre Ride II the Pharcyde.

== Composition ==
The song was produced by J-Swift, and contains samples of "Summer in the City" by Quincy Jones, "125th Street Congress" by Weather Report, "Hill Where the Lord Hides" by Eddie Russ, and "Are You Experienced?" by the Jimi Hendrix Experience.

== Lyrics ==
The group's four emcees, Bootie Brown, Slimkid3, Imani, and Fatlip recount schoolboy crushes which all eventually led to heartbreak, with the chorus featuring Fatlip singing, "She keeps on passin' me by" against a soprano saxophone riff.

== Music video ==
The music video (directed by Sanji) is shot in black and white. The rappers are seen riding in the back seat of a car or rapping behind a fence. Throughout the video, the group is seen upside-down in comparison to the rest of the world.

== Track listing ==
A-side

1. "Passin' Me By" (video remix)
2. "Passin' Me By" (video instrumental)
3. "Passin' Me By" (a capella)

B-side

1. "Pork" (original version)
2. "Pork" (Cosby edit)
3. "Pork" (instrumental)

== Reception ==
The song peaked atop the Hot Rap Singles chart, number 52 on the Billboard Hot 100, and number 28 on the Hot R&B/Hip-Hop Singles & Tracks chart.

Pitchfork included the song at number 41 on their "Top 200 Tracks of the 90s".

== Other media ==
"Passin' Me By" was sampled by Joe for his number one single "Stutter".

The song was featured in the soundtrack for the video game NBA 2K9 as well as in the game Aggressive Inline. An instrumental clip of the song was used in the opening of the 1999 film Big Daddy. The song was remixed and titled "Rinsing Quince" by Aphrodite in 2003.

The line "There she goes again, the dopest Ethiopian" is quoted in the song "Bang Bang" from K'naan's second studio album, Troubadour.

In the single "Blurred Lines" by Robin Thicke (featuring Pharrell and T.I.), T.I. raps, "In a hundred years, not dare would I / Pull a Pharcyde, let you pass me by."

In 2017, the song was featured in the Netflix original TV series Atypical in the second episode of season one, "A Human Female".

The song appeared in the FX series Atlanta in the episode "FUBU" (season two, episode ten).

In January 2019, "Passin' Me By" was featured in the Netflix original comedy series Friends from College in the episode "Storage Unit" (season two, episode two).

In October 2018, the song was featured in the film mid90s as well as the independent film Anthem of a Teenage Prophet.

In March 2021, the song was featured in Last Chance U: Basketball, in the first season second episode "Hooper".

In 2022, the song was featured in Kenan, in the second-season episode "Moving Violations".

In 2023, the song appeared in the film Fast X, in a scene with Jakob and Little Brian.

== Charts ==
Chart (1993)	Peak position
UK Singles (Official Charts)	55
US Billboard Hot 100	52
US Dance Singles Sales (Billboard)	6
US Hot R&B/Hip-Hop Songs (Billboard)	28
US Hot Rap Songs (Billboard)	1

== Certifications ==
Region	Certification	Certified units/sales
United Kingdom (BPI)	Silver	200,000^{‡}
United States (RIAA)	Platinum	1,000,000^{‡}
^{‡} Sales+streaming figures based on certification alone.
