= Slimkid3 =

American rapper (born 1970)

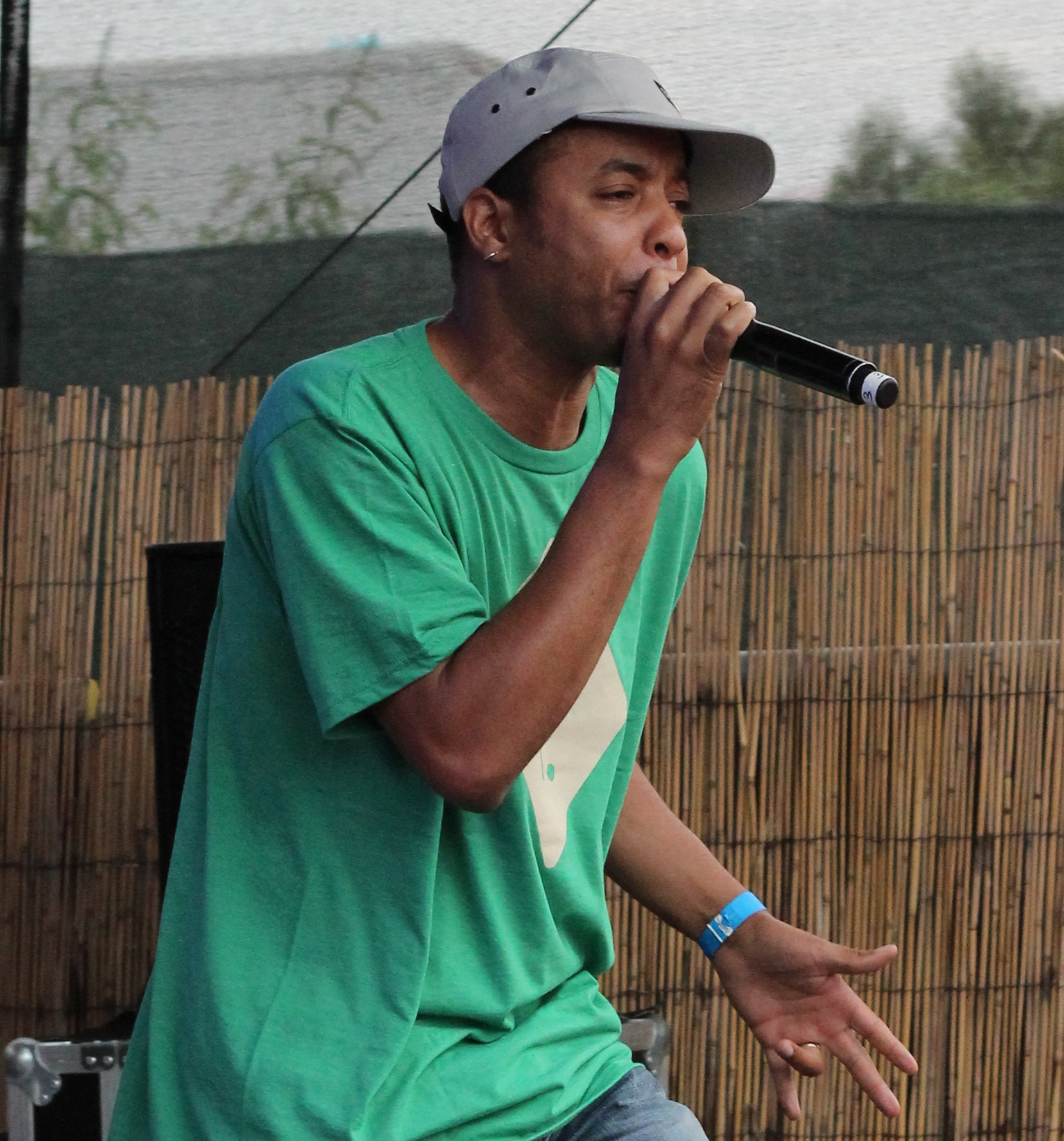
- Slim Kid performing in 2013

Background information
- Also known as: Tre Hardson; Slim Kid Tre; The Legend of Phoenix
- Born: Trevant Hardson; October 5, 1970 (age 56)
- Origin: Gardena, California, U.S.
- Genres: Hip-hop; R&B
- Years active: 1989–present
- Labels: Delicious Vinyl; Flying Baboon; Up Above
- Member of: The Pharcyde
- Website: slimkid3.com

Trevant Hardson (born October 5, 1970), known professionally as Slimkid3 (Slim Kid Tre; sometimes stylized as SlimKid3) or as Tre, is an American rapper from Los Angeles. He is a founding member of the Pharcyde.

== Career ==
Tre Hardson began his career in the entertainment industry as a dancer and choreographer under the moniker Two for Two with his two high school friends Bootie Brown and Imani. The dance group was featured in music videos for Michael Jackson’s "Remember the Time", Herb Alpert, Tone Loc, and appeared as "Fly Guys" in the TV show In Living Color.

As a member of The Pharcyde, he has contributed to Bizarre Ride II the Pharcyde, as well as its follow-up release Labcabincalifornia. He also worked on the third album Plain Rap with the two remaining members of The Pharcyde after Fatlip's departure. After the release of Plain Rap, Tre also decided to leave the group to pursue a solo career.

Since his departure from The Pharcyde, Tre would also go by birth name of "Tre Hardson" as well as "Slimkid3". He has also formed the band Faqawi which has accompanied him with his solo career.

In 1996, Slimkid3 produced Brian Austin Green's debut album, One Stop Carnival.

In 1998, Slimkid3 collaborated with nu metal band Korn. He was featured on their single "Cameltosis" from their third studio album Follow the Leader. His first solo album, Liberation, was released in 2002. Recorded over three years, it featured contributions from the likes of MC Lyte, Saul Williams, Chali 2na, N'Dea Davenport, and Kim Hill.

In 2011, Slimkid3 released Another Day Another Dollar, a collaborative EP with DJ Nu-Mark. Slimkid3 & DJ Nu-Mark, his collaborative album with DJ Nu-Mark, was released on Delicious Vinyl in 2014.

== Discography ==
=== Albums ===
- Liberation (2002)
- Slimkid3's Cafe (2006)
- Love (2012) (with Fatlip)
- Slimkid3 & DJ Nu-Mark (2014) (with DJ Nu-Mark)
- TRDMRK (2019) (with TRDMRK, DJ Nu-Mark and Austin Antoine)

=== EPs ===
- The Legend of Phoenix (2000)
- Another Day Another Dollar (2011) (with DJ Nu-Mark)
- Monkey Bizness (2015) (with Tony Ozier)

=== Singles ===
- "Ayyomyman" b/w "Roots Love & Culture" (2002)
- "All I Want for Christmas (Is Somebody Else)" (2007) (with Fatlip)
- "Bom Bom Fiya" b/w "Bouillon" (2014) (with DJ Nu-Mark)
- "I Know, Didn't I" b/w "No Pity Party" (2014) (with DJ Nu-Mark)
- "King" b/w "Let Me Hit" (2014) (with DJ Nu-Mark)
- Hands Up (2019) (with TRDMRK, DJ Nu-Mark and Austin Antoine)

=== Guest appearances ===
- Korn – "Cameltosis" from Follow the Leader (1998)
- "What of a Love Unspoken" from The Rose That Grew from Concrete (2000)
- The Angel – "Make It Betta (No Cuss Version)" from No Gravity (2001)
- Fieldy's Dreams – "Sugar-Coated" from Rock'n Roll Gangster (2002)
- Mýa – "Fallen (Remix)" (2003)
- Erick Sermon – "Street Hop" from Chilltown, New York (2004)
- Jazz Liberatorz – "Ease My Mind" from Clin D'Oeil (2008)
- EPMD – "Actin' Up" from We Mean Business (2008)
- Ivan Ives – "Stand Up" from Newspeak (2009)
- N.A.S.A. – "Hip Hop" from The Spirit of Apollo (2009)
- Iron Lyon – "Keep On" from From the Ground Up (2012)
- Yancey Boys – "Rock My World" from Sunset Blvd. (2013)
- Alex Lilly – "Paranoid Times" from Paranoid Times (Single) (2014)
- K-Natural – "Open" (2018)
- K-Natural – "Windows" (2018)
- Matt Diamind – "Castles" (2022)
- Da Staummtisch – "Lova" from NIRWANA (2023)
- Schmiddlfinga – "One Question" (2023)
- Fatlip & Blu – "Ain’t Changed" from Live From The End Of The World (Deluxe Edition) (2023)
- K-Natural – "Blockchain" (2023)
- K-Natural – "Bonfire" (2023)
- Slick Walk – "No Way" (2024)
- Grand Turn – "I Wanna Be Someone" (2024)
- Adrian Quesada – "Tent City" (2025)

=== Production ===
- Brian Austin Green – One Stop Carnival (1996)
