= Fatlip =

American rapper (born 1969)

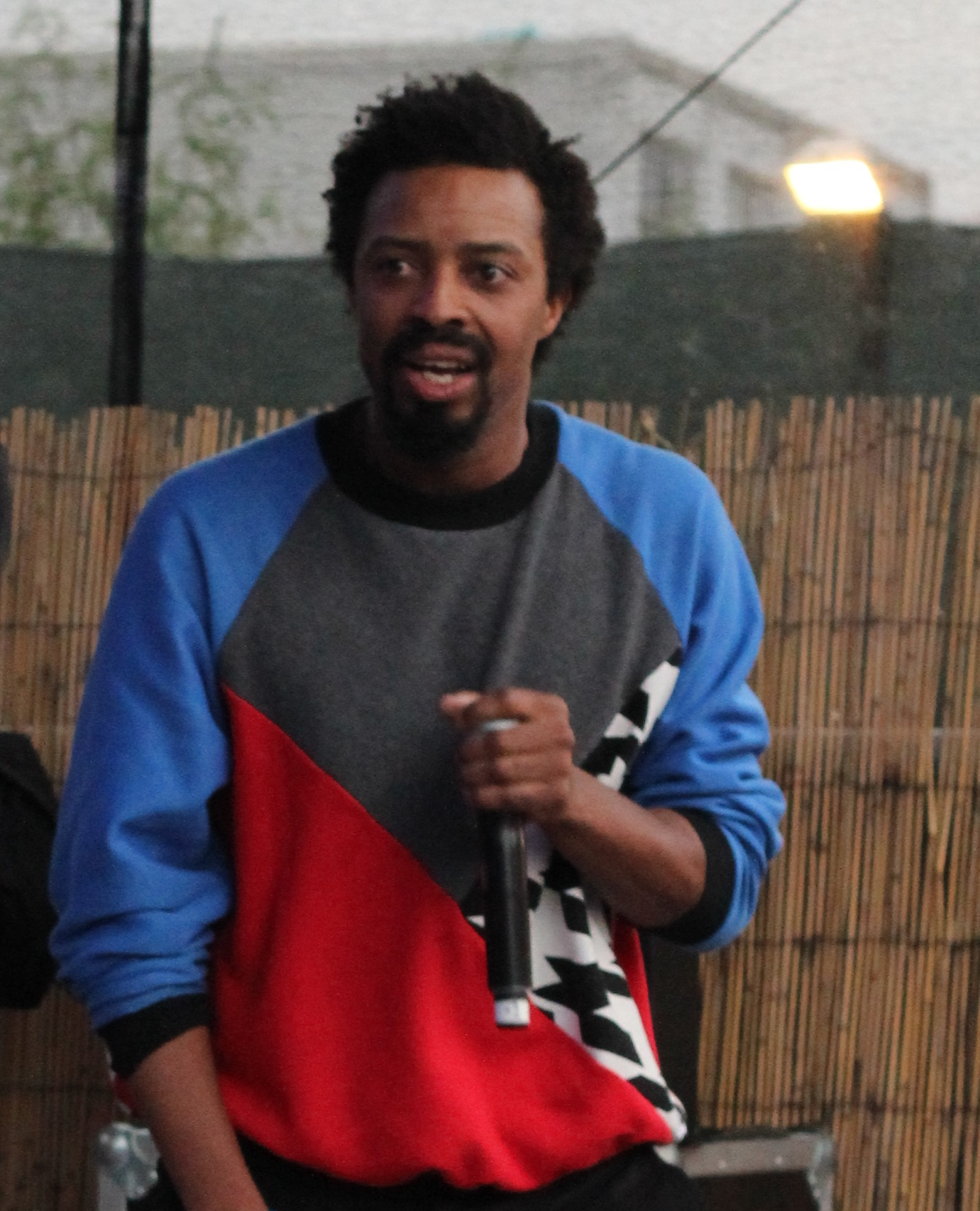
- Fatlip performing at the Live à LaPlage de Glaz'Art in Paris, France, in 2013

Background information
- Also known as: Jammer D, The Lip
- Born: Derrick Lemel Stewart; March 26, 1969 (age 57)
- Origin: Fairfax District, Los Angeles, U.S.
- Genres: Hip hop
- Occupation: Rapper
- Instrument: Vocals
- Years active: 1990–present
- Label: Delicious Vinyl
- Website: Official website

Derrick Lemel Stewart (born March 26, 1969), known professionally as Fatlip, is an American rapper. He started his career in the hip hop group The Pharcyde.

== Career ==
=== The Pharcyde ===
As a member of The Pharcyde, Fatlip contributed to the critically acclaimed Bizarre Ride II the Pharcyde as well as the follow-up release Labcabincalifornia. After the release of the Labcabincalifornia album, Fatlip was kicked out of the group, in part for leaving the supporting tour for their second album in favor of working on his own solo efforts.

=== Solo career ===
In 2005, Fatlip released his solo debut, The Loneliest Punk. It stood as his only solo album until the release of Torpor 17 years later. The album includes his single from 2000, "What's Up Fatlip?" (which was included in the soundtrack for Tony Hawk's American Wasteland and the Youth In Revolt soundtrack). The music video for "What's Up Fatlip?" was directed by Spike Jonze. During the filming process, Jonze compiled interviews with Fatlip and put them together in a documentary also titled "What's Up, Fatlip?".

Fatlip appeared on MTV's Jackass sliding down an escalator rail, and this was edited into his video for "Worst Case Scenario".

=== Collaborations ===
In 2001, Fatlip was featured on L.A. Symphony's Big Broke L.A. EP on the track "What You Say".

Fatlip had a cameo in Southern rapper Ludacris's "Get Back" video.

In 2007, Fatlip collaborated with The Chemical Brothers on their song "The Salmon Dance"; the song is featured on the latter's We Are the Night album.

Fatlip is featured on the track "Dream and Imaginate" by The Wascals.

Fatlip has collaborated with a crew from France known as the Jazz Liberatorz. In 2008, he appeared on their album Clin D'Oeil, on two tracks, "Ease My Mind" and "Genius At Work", the latter of which also featured Tre Hardson, Omni, and T-Love. He also appeared twice on the subsequent Jazz Liberatorz album, Fruit of the Past, on "My Style Is Fly" and "Back Packers".

Fatlip is featured on the song "Luxury Pool" from the 2008 album Stainless Style by Neon Neon.

In early 2009, Fatlip also appeared on two tracks on The Spirit of Apollo, the debut album by N.A.S.A., which was a collaboration project between Sam Spiegel and DJ Zegon. The two songs were "Hip Hop" (also featuring KRS-One and Tre Hardson) and "Strange Enough" (also featuring Karen O and Ol' Dirty Bastard.) Other artists who appeared on the album included Method Man, E-40, Chali 2na, and David Byrne, among others.

2016 saw Fatlip collaborate with Edo G on a song called "Playtimee Over", produced by Tone Spliff. Then, in 2017, Fatlip was featured on the track "Mr. Lonely" by Portland-based band Portugal. The Man. The song was included on the band's album Woodstock, and Fatlip received a writing credit for it.

In 2019, Fatlip appeared on "Aw Hell You Motherfuckin' Right", a song from A Joy Which Nothing Can Erase, the third full-length album by Toronto rapper The Mighty Rhino. The song also featured Ultra Magnus, and was produced by Myer Clarity, with scratches by DJ Digital Junkie.

In 2020, Fatlip released a collaboration with Blu and Samuel T. Herring, the latter credited as Hemlock Ernst. The song was called "Good For The Soul". That year also saw Fatlip collaborate with Percee P and Phil Da Agony on the song "For You".

=== Reunion with Tre Hardson ===
Fatlip has reunited with former Pharcyde member Tre Hardson to perform on The Over 30, Dirty Old Men Tour together.

=== Torpor: Pharcyde reunion ===
On February 18, 2022, Fatlip released the lead single, “Dust in the Wind”, off of his new solo album, “Torpor”, produced by Los Angeles–based production team Sccit & Siavash The Grouch. The single, featuring Krayzie Bone, marks the first time a member of The Pharcyde has collaborated with a member of Bone Thugs-N-Harmony. The second single, released on April 20, 2022, is a collaborative effort with RBX of Death Row Records & M.O titled “Wake Up” and includes a music video themed around the Los Angeles homeless epidemic. The album was officially released exclusively on CD on July 29, 2022. The next single, titled “My Bad”, was released on August 1, 2022, as the first complete Pharcyde song in over 25 years (including all 4 original members). Surrounded by controversy, the reunion song made big headlines when Rolling Stone wrote a piece detailing the on-going inner conflict within the group. The album was finally released digitally on August 23, 2022. The 4th Single, “Energy”, was released September 9, 2022, and features Sccit on the 2nd verse, as well as RBX narrating. An eclectic video for the song was released that same day. “Torpor” also includes Butch Cassidy (singer), as well as production by Jellyroll, Chris Taylor (music producer) (also known as The Glove) and more.

== Discography ==
List of albums by Fatlip
Title	Release date	Singles
The Loneliest Punk	November 1, 2005	"What's Up Fatlip?", "The Story of Us"
Torpor	July 29, 2022	"Dust In The Wind", "Wake Up", "My Bad", "Energy", "The Way"

List of collab albums
Title	Release date	Singles
Love (with Slimkid3)	December 13, 2012	N/A
Live from the End of the World (with Blu)	April 14, 2023	"Good For The Soul", "Gangsta Rap"
