= Delicious Vinyl =

American independent record label

- Founded: 1987
- Founder: Michael Ross, Matt Dike
- Genre: Hip-hop, dance
- Country of origin: U.S.
- Location: Los Angeles, California, U.S.
- Official website: www.deliciousvinyl.com

Delicious Vinyl is an American independent record label founded by Matt Dike and Michael Ross in 1987 and based in Los Angeles, California.

== History ==
Michael Ross was a student at the University of California, Los Angeles when he met Matt Dike, a DJ from New York, in 1983. Dike was working at the Rhythm Lounge in Hollywood. They discovered that they were both members of Impact Record Pool, a service that provided new 12" records to club DJs, and that they shared an interest in soul, funk, and hip-hop. Soon Dike became the top DJ at Power Tools, a club in Los Angeles.

In 1987, they founded Delicious Vinyl, an independent record label. Almost immediately the label was a success. Delicious Vinyl's first release was "On Fire"/"Cheeba Cheeba" by Tone Loc, a Los Angeles gang member. The label's third release, Romeo & Master Rhyme's "Crackerjack," got played on L.A.'s rap radio station KDAY. It caused controversy for criticizing N.W.A.

The label’s success was solidified when Tone Loc's "Wild Thing" sold 2.5 million copies its first year. It was helped by a video parody of Robert Palmer's "Addicted to Love," but failed to reach the top of the Billboard charts. Tone Loc's follow-up single, "Funky Cold Medina," an ode to an aphrodisiac beverage, sampled Foreigner and Kiss, and cemented Dike's and Ross's method of inserting rock riffs into rap singles.

Young MC recorded the million-selling hit single "Bust a Move." Def Jef was the most lyrical rapper in the label's early years, though his two albums Just a Poet with Soul (1989) and Soul Food (1991) never achieved the crossover success of Tone Loc and Young MC.

The label's third release was a single by Mellow Man Ace that is one of the earliest instances of hip-hop recorded in Spanish. But the label was not strictly a hip-hop label, as they signed London-based rare-groove group The Brand New Heavies, which, with lead vocalist N'Dea Davenport, recorded the 1991 hit single "Never Stop." In 1991, Delicious Vinyl reissued the self-titled Masters of Reality (originally released on Def American in 1988). The label also had a short-lived heavy metal subsidiary called Malicious Vinyl.

In 1992, Delicious Vinyl entered a joint venture with Atlantic Records. In 1995, Ross filed a petition in L.A. Superior Court seeking the appointment of a provisional director for the label. In his petition, Ross alleged that Dike "began to abdicate responsibility and management" of the label in 1992. Ross retained ownership of Delicious Vinyl, making it one of the longest-running independent labels in hip-hop history.

Delicious Vinyl signed The Pharcyde, whose debut album Bizarre Ride II the Pharcyde (1992) featured the hit single "Passin' Me By." Produced by J-Swift, the album sold half a million copies. Masta Ace joined the label delivering two strong albums, 1993's Slaughterhouse and 1995's Sittin' on Chrome (under the group moniker Masta Ace Incorporated). Other significant acts on the label in the mid '90s included Born Jamericans and The WhoRidas.

A remix project, Delicious Rmxxology, was curated by DV's Rick Ross with Peaches, Breakbot, Mr. Flash, Cory Nitta, Aaron LaCrate & Samir, Hot Chip, Don Rimini, Diplo & Philippians) reworking the Delicious Vinyl catalog. The first single from the remix project was Peaches' version of Tone Loc's "Wild Thing".

In 2018, Delicious Vinyl co-founder Matt Dike died in Los Angeles at the age of 56.

== Delicious Pizza ==
Delicious Vinyl expanded its brand into restaurants when, in 2015, Mike partnered with father and son team Fred Sutherland and Travis Sutherland, and his brother, Rick Ross, to open Delicious Pizza on West Adams in Los Angeles. The store is part pizza shop and part hip-hop museum as the owners display several pieces of memorabilia throughout the venue. A year later, the duo opened a Delicious Pizza on Sunset Boulevard in Hollywood. Both establishments hold several music events throughout the year, bringing food and fun to the community.

== Discography ==
=== Albums ===
- 1989 : Master Rhyme - "Go Off Shot"
- 1999: Waxing Off: The First Decade
- 2000: Delicious Vinyl Presents...Prime Cuts Vol. 1
- 2007: Jay Deelicious: The Delicious Vinyl Years
- 2008: RMXXOLOGY

=== Singles ===
- Romeo & Master Rhyme : "Crackerjack" (No. 1)
- Tone Loc: "Wild Thing" (No. 2)
- Tone Loc: "Funky Cold Medina" (No. 3)
- Tone Loc: "I Got It Goin' On" (No. 4)
- Young MC: "Bust a Move" (No. 7)
- The Pharcyde: "Passin' Me By"
- The Pharcyde: "Drop"
- The Pharcyde: "She Said"
- Masta Ace: "Sittin' on Chrome" (No. 84)

== Artists ==
- Born Jamericans
- Brand New Heavies
- Bucwheed
- Casey Veggies
- Def Jef
- Dom Kennedy
- Duce Duce
- Fatlip
- The Flys
- Frank Nitt
- J Dilla Aka Jay Dee (and his younger brother, Illa J)
- Jansport J
- Jesse Jaymes
- Machel Montano
- Masta Ace
- Master Rhyme
- Mellow Man Ace
- Mr Vegas
- The Pharcyde
- The Wascals
- The WhoRidas
- The ZZYZZX (Mellow Man Ace and his son, Cazal Organism)
- Tone Loc
- Young MC
