= Central Heating 2 =

Compilation album by Grand Central Records
- Released: 17 April 2000 (Original); 12 January 2004 (Re-release)
- Recorded: ?
- Genre: Hip-Hop/Electronica
- Length: 90:26
- Label: Grand Central Records; GCCD106 (Original); GCCD106R (Re-release)
- Producer: ?

Grand Central Records chronology
Central Reservations (1997)	Central Heating 2 (2000)	Ordered From The Catalogue (2001)

Alternative cover
- Central Heating 2 (re-issue)

Central Heating 2 (also known as Central Heating Vol. 2) is the fourth compilation from Grand Central Records. The two disc album was originally released on 17 April 2000 and re-released with alternative sleeve art on 12 January 2004.

It follows compilation album Central Heating.

== Disc one ==
1. "Fame" - Gripper
2. "Crazy Rhymin'" (featuring Kriminul) - Only Child
3. "Distant Invitation" (featuring Siron) - Rae & Christian
4. "Breakneck" - Only Child
5. "Communicated" - Riton
6. "Jazz Cop" - Gripper
7. "Wait Until Spring" - Aim
8. "Break It Down" - Loudicrus
9. "Kitten" (featuring Jane Weaver) - Andy Votel
10. "Anything You Want" (featuring QNC) (Aim remix) - Rae & Christian

== Disc two ==
1. "Drop A Jewel" (featuring Afu Ra) - Funky Fresh Few
2. "Atomic Drop" - Fingathing
3. "The Jersey Devil" - Tony D
4. "The Squirrel" - Mr. Scruff & Mark Rae
5. "Bring It On" - Dual Control
6. "Fine" - Kate Rogers
7. "Welbury Way" - Tony D
8. "Following The Noughties" - J-Walk
9. "Banger" - Funky Fresh Few
10. "Should Have Known" (featuring Lisa Shaw) - Rae & Christian

== See also ==
- Grand Central Records compilations
