= Nocturnal Activity =

Remix album by Rae & Christian
- Released: 25 March 2002
- Genre: Electronica, hip hop
- Label: Grand Central
- Producer: Rae & Christian

Rae & Christian chronology
Another Late Night: Rae & Christian (2001)	Nocturnal Activity (2002)

Professional ratings
Review scores
Source	Rating
AllMusic	link

Nocturnal Activity is a remix album by Rae & Christian, released in 2002 on the independent record label Grand Central Records. It is composed of alternative mixes of the tracks from Sleepwalking album, plus one new track, a cover version of the Parliament track "Flashlight".

== Track listing ==
1. "Not Just Anyone" (Atjazz Flugelhorn remix) (featuring Kate Rogers)
2. "Vai Viver a Vida" (Tom and Joyce's 80's Funk remix) (featuring Tania Maria)
3. "Ready to Roll" (Bushy remix)
4. "Trailing in the Wake" (Only Child Retread)
5. "Flashlight" (Parliament cover)
6. "Vai Viver a Vida" (Truant's Little Witch Pass) (featuring Tania Maria)
7. "It Ain't Nothing Like" (The Nextmen remix) (featuring The Pharcyde)
8. "Let It Go" (Groove Armada's Country House remix) (featuring The Pharcyde)
9. "Wake Up Everybody" (Rae & Christian remix) (featuring Bobby Womack)
10. "Hold Us Down" (Faze Action Reggae remix) (featuring The Congos)
11. "Salvation" (Dual Control remix) (featuring Siron)
12. "Get a Life" (Acoustic version) (featuring Bobby Womack)
