= FabricLive.17 =

Compilation album by Aim
- Released: 16 August 2004
- Labels: Fabric fabric34radio

Aim chronology
Means of Production (2003)	FabricLive.17 (2004)	Flight 602 (2006)

FabricLive chronology
FabricLive.16 (2004)	FabricLive.17 (2004)	FabricLive.18 (2004)

Professional ratings
Review scores
Source	Rating
Allmusic	4/5 stars

FabricLive.17 was the second DJ mix album mixed by English DJ and record producer Aim. It forms part of the FabricLive Mix Series by different DJs, recorded for Fabric, a nightclub and record label in London, UK. The album was released in August 2004 on the Fabric (London) label.

== Track listing ==
1. Tony D - Come Back To You - Grand Central
2. Boards Of Canada - Roygbiv - Warp
3. James Yorkston and the Athletes - St. Patrick - Domino
4. InI - What You Say - Rapstar
5. Scott Lark - Insight - Contract Recordings
6. Lewis Parker - 101 Pianos (I've Put Out The Lights) - Virgin
7. Boogiemonsters - Strange - EMI
8. Lords of the Underground - Faith (Alternate TV track) - Pendulum
9. Bloik - Loungin' - Mint Source
10. Tom Scott - Today - UMG
11. A Tribe Called Quest - Award Tour - Zomba
12. Ed O.G. & Da Bulldogs - Love Comes and Goes - UMG
13. Diverse - Jus Biz - Chocolate Industries
14. Telegraph Avenue - Something Going - Lazarus Audio Products
15. Tempo 70 - Ell Galleton - Mericana/Salsoul
16. The Village Callers - I Don't Need No Doctor - Rampart
17. Ice Cube - It Was A Good Day (Radio Mix) - Priority
18. The Byrds - Wasn't Born To Follow - Sony
19. Fingathing - Lady Nebula - Grand Central
