= Blazing the Crop =

Compilation album by Rae & Christian
- Released: 20 September 1999
- Genre: Electronica, hip hop
- Label: Mixmag Live (UK); Moonshine Music (US); Razor & Tie (re-release)
- Producer: Rae & Christian

Rae & Christian chronology
Northern Sulphuric Soul (1998)	Blazing the Crop (1999)	Sleepwalking (2001)

Alternative cover
- Mixer Presents Rewind (re-issue)

Professional ratings
Review scores
Source	Rating
AllMusic	3/5 stars

Blazing the Crop is a DJ mix album, mixed by Rae & Christian. It was released by Mixmag Live in association with their publishing company DMC Publishing in 1999 in the UK. An unmixed vinyl version was also released.

In the United States, the CD was released by Mixmag's American sister company Mixer via Moonshine Music label in 2000. It was re-released in 2002 by the Razor & Tie label for, under the alternative title Mixer Presents: Rewind by Rae & Christian, with a different sleeve.

On their second studio album, Sleepwalking (2001), the opening track was entitled "Blazing the Crop". This track was also included on the 2002 Ministry of Sound compilation album, "Ultimate Chillout".

== Track listings ==
=== CD ===
1. "Play On" (Watch Out for This! Mix) - Rae & Christian (featuring Jungle Brothers)
2. "Funky for You" (Spacehopper Mix) - Deadbeats
3. "Planetary Deadlock" - Beanfield
4. "S and M on the Rocks" - Swollen Members
5. "Can't Stop" - Constant Deviants / "Crazy Rhymin" (A Capella) - Only Child (featuring Kriminul)
6. "Me and Him" - Porn Theatre Ushers / "Ain't Got Time to Waste" (A Capella) - Aim (featuringYZ)
7. "All My People" (Body Rock Party Break) - Mos Def / "Ain't Got Time to Waste" (A Capella) - Aim (featuring YZ)
8. "Just Passin' Through" - Aim
9. "For Claudia" - Face & Feline
10. "Spandex Man" - Mr Scruff
11. "Time to Shine" - Rae & Christian
12. "People" - Riton
13. "Rock" - DJ Spinna
14. "My Part of Town" - Tuff Crew
15. "Get a Move On" - Mr Scruff
16. "Bacalau" - Rae & Christian
17. "Young and Holtful" - Young-Holt Unlimited

=== Unmixed vinyl version ===
1. "Bacalau" - Rae & Christian
2. "My Part Of Town" - Tuff Crew
3. "Spandex Man" - Mr Scruff
4. "Time To Shine" - Rae & Christian
5. "S & M On The Rocks" - Swollen Members
6. "Funky For You" (Spacehopper Remix) - Deadbeats
7. "People" - Riton
8. "All My People" (Body Rock Party Break) - Rawkus (remixed by Dr Luke)
9. "For Claudia" - Face & Feline
10. "Planetary Deadlock" - Beanfield
11. "Get A Move On" - Mr Scruff
12. "Young & Holtful" - Young Holt Unlimited
