= Sleepwalking (Rae & Christian album) =

Studio album by Rae & Christian
- Released: 26 February 2001
- Genre: Electronica, hip hop
- Label: Grand Central; Studio !K7
- Producer: Rae & Christian

Rae & Christian chronology
Blazing the Crop (1999)	Sleepwalking (2001)	Another Late Night: Rae & Christian (2001)

Professional ratings
Review scores
Source	Rating
AllMusic	2/5 stars

The second album by Grand Central Records artists Rae & Christian, released in 2001. In the US it was released on the Studio !K7 label.

== Track listing ==
1. "Blazing the Crop"
2. "Hold Us Down" (featuring The Congos)
3. "It Ain't Nothing Like" (featuring The Pharcyde)
4. "Get a Life" (featuring Bobby Womack)
5. "Not Just Anybody" (featuring Kate Rogers)
6. "Trailing in the Wake"
7. "Vai Viver a Vida" (featuring Tania Maria)
8. "Let It Go" (featuring The Pharcyde)
9. "Ready to Roll"
10. "Wake Up Everybody" (featuring Bobby Womack)
11. "Salvation" (featuring Siron)

== Personnel ==
- Mahavishnu Orchestra – sampled strings
- Michael Ball – assistant engineer
- Mandy Parnell – mastering
- Kate Rogers – performer
- Josef – horn
- Rae & Christian – main performer
- Tania Maria – vocals
- Bobby Womack – guitar
- Dejuana Richardson – engineer
- John Schroeder – sampling
- Rick Cowling – engineer
- Steve Christian – engineer, mixing
- Roger Wickham – horn
- Chris Owen – assistant engineer
- Eric Steinen – engineer

== Charts ==
Chart performance for Sleepwalking
Chart (2001)	Peak position
French Albums (SNEP)	114
UK Albums (OCC)	57
