= Central heating (disambiguation) =

Central heating may refer to:

- Central heating, a heating system that distributes heat from a single source
- Central Heating (Grand Central album), the second compilation released by Grand Central Records
- Central Heating 2, the fourth compilation from Grand Central Records
- Central Heating (Heatwave album), 1978, or the title song

== See also ==
- Central Heating Plant, (Washington, D.C.), listed on the National Register of Historic Places
