= Seconds (Kate Rogers album) =

Studio album by Kate Rogers
- Released: 31 May 2005
- Genre: Cover versions
- Length: 32:45
- Label: Grand Central Records; GCCD139

Kate Rogers chronology
St. Eustacia (2004)	Seconds (2005)

Seconds is the third album released by Kate Rogers. Seconds consists of eight cover versions in Rogers's downtempo style, plus one new original track, written and performed with Grand Central Records label-mate, Jon Kennedy.

Colm O'Hare of Hot Press called it "a quietly enjoyable record and the perfect summer soundtrack".

== Track listing ==
1. "Bigmouth Strikes Again" (The Smiths cover) – 3:47
2. "Climbing Up the Walls" (Radiohead cover) – 3:46
3. "Sail" (Aim & Kate Rogers) – 4:42
4. "Here Comes Your Man" (The Pixies cover) – 3:18
5. "Big Me" (Foo Fighters cover) – 2:01
6. "Broken Arrow" (Neil Young/Buffalo Springfield cover) – 3:57
7. "I Miss You" (Blink-182 cover) – 3:11
8. "Brain Stew" (Green Day cover) – 2:44
9. "Nothing Appeals to Me Here" (Kate Rogers & Jon Kennedy) – 5:19
