= The New World Order (album) =

Studio album by Poor Righteous Teachers
- Released: October 15, 1996
- Studios: Battery (New York); Platinum Island; Interlude; Entity (New Jersey)
- Genres: Political hip-hop; jazz rap
- Length: 1:03:22
- Label: Profile
- Producers: Culture Freedom; DJ Clark Kent; Ezo Brown; Father Shaheed; KRS-One

Poor Righteous Teachers chronology
Black Business (1993)	The New World Order (1996)

Singles from The New World Order
- 1. "Word Iz Life" Released: October 29, 1996

Professional ratings
Review scores
Source	Rating
AllMusic	4/5 stars
Muzik	3/5 stars
RapReviews	7/10
The Source	3/5 stars

The New World Order is the fourth and final studio album by American hip-hop trio Poor Righteous Teachers. It was released in October 1996 via Profile Records.

The recording sessions took place at Battery Studios, Platinum Island Studios, and Interlude Studios, in New York, and at Entity Recording Studio in New Jersey. It was produced by members Father Shaheed and Culture Freedom, as well as Ezo Brown, DJ Clark Kent, and KRS-One. It features guest appearances from Brother J, Junior Reid, KRS-One, MissJones, Nine, Sluggy Ranks, and the Fugees.

In the United States, the album peaked at number 57 on the Top R&B/Hip-Hop Albums chart. It was supported by a single "Word Iz Life" b/w "Dreadful Day", which made it to number 50 on the Hot Rap Songs chart, and a promotional single "Conscious Style".

The effort didn't sell as well as their past work but received strong reviews. It is the group's only album to not contain production by frequent collaborator Tony D. The liner notes included information from Five-Percent Nation teachings.

== Track listing ==
No.	Title	Writer(s)	Producer(s)	Length
1.	"Who Shot the President?" (Intro)			0:39
2.	"Miss Ghetto"	Timothy Grimes; Scott Phillips; Albert Johnson; Kejuan Muchita	Father Shaheed	4:45
3.	"Word Iz Life"	Grimes; Ezo Brown	Ezo Brown	4:30
4.	"Allies" (featuring Fugees)	Grimes; Kerry Williams; Lauryn Hill; Wyclef Jean; Samuel Michel	Culture Freedom	4:29
5.	"New World News" (Interlude)			1:16
6.	"Gods, Earths and 85ers" (featuring Nine)	Grimes; Phillips; Derrick Keyes; Corey Woods; Robert Diggs Jr.; Clifford Smith; Dennis Coles; Gary Grice; Jason Hunter; Lamont Hawkins; Russell Jones; Alan Bergman; Marilyn Bergman; Michel Legrand	Father Shaheed	4:53
7.	"My Three Wives (Shakyla, Pt. 3)" (featuring MissJones)	Grimes; Brown; Lonnie Liston Smith	Ezo Brown	5:34
8.	"Wicked Everytime"	Grimes; Williams	Culture Freedom	3:13
9.	"N.A.T.O. (Global Cops)" (Interlude)			0:52
10.	"Conscious Style" (featuring KRS-One)	Grimes; Lawrence Parker	KRS-One	4:26
11.	"Culture Freestyles" (Interlude)			2:20
12.	"They Turned Gangsta" (featuring Brother J and Sluggy Ranks)	Grimes; Phillips; Jason Hunter; Andrew Gregory	Father Shaheed	4:15
13.	"We Dat Nice"	Grimes; Phillips; Johnson; Muchita	Father Shaheed	4:37
14.	"Hear Me Out" (Interlude)			1:46
15.	"Fo da Love of Dis"	Grimes; Williams	Culture Freedom	4:39
16.	"Dreadful Day" (featuring Jr. Reid)	Grimes; Delroy Reid; Rodolfo Franklin; Alan Price	DJ Clark Kent	4:30
17.	"Sistuh"	Grimes; Phillips	Father Shaheed	4:32
18.	Untitled			2:06
Total length:				1:03:22

Sample credits

- Track 2 contains a sample from "Survival of the Fittest" by Mobb Deep.
- Track 3 contains samples from "Jimbrowski" performed by the Jungle Brothers, and "Don't Stop Loving Me Now" performed by LTD.
- Track 6 contains samples from "Can It Be All So Simple (Remix)" performed by Raekwon, and "Wake Up" written by J. Dajani, John Gamble, Dante Ross and Maxwell Dixon and performed by Brand Nubian.
- Track 7 contains samples from "The Enchantress" performed by Lonnie Liston Smith, and "Love Is Stronger Than Pride" written by Helen Adu, Andrew Hale and Stuart Matthewman and performed by Sade.
- Track 10 contains a sample of "Ghetto Youth Bust" performed by Sluggy Ranks.
- Track 13 contains samples from "Shook Ones, Part II" performed by Mobb Deep, and "Just Rhymin' with Biz" written by Antonio Hardy and Marlon Williams and performed by Big Daddy Kane.
- Track 16 contains an interpolation of "House of the Rising Sun", written by A. Reid.

== Personnel ==
- Timothy "Wise Intelligent" Grimes – co-producer, executive producer
- Kerry "Culture Freedom" Williams – producer (tracks: 4, 8, 15), co-producer, executive producer
- Scott "Father Shaheed" Phillips – producer (tracks: 2, 6, 12, 13, 17), co-producer, mixing (tracks: 1, 2, 4-6, 8-15, 17), executive producer
- Wyclef Jean – vocals (track 4)
- Samuel "Pras" Michel – vocals (track 4)
- Lauryn Hill – vocals (track 4)
- Derrick "Nine" Keyes – vocals (track 6)
- Tarsha "MissJones" Jones – vocals (track 7)
- Lawrence "KRS-One" Parker – vocals & producer (track 10)
- Jason "Brother J" Hunter – vocals (track 12)
- Andrew "Sluggy Ranks" Gregory – vocals (track 12)
- Delroy "Junior" Reid – vocals (track 16)
- Turiya Mason – additional vocals (track 17)
- Rob Lewis – guitar (track 16)
- Ezo Brown – producer (tracks: 3, 7), mixing (tracks: 3, 7, 16)
- Rodolfo "DJ Clark Kent" Franklin – producer (track 16), mixing (tracks: 3, 7, 16)
- Ken "Duro" Ifill – engineering (tracks: 1, 2, 4-6, 8-15, 17)
- Kenny Ortiz – engineering (tracks: 3, 7, 16)
- "Commissioner" Gordon Williams – engineering (track 10)
- Craig Bevan – mastering
- Chris Landry – executive producer
- Carla Leighton – art direction, design
- Martin Dixon – photography
- Wayne Dennis – management

== Charts ==
Chart (1996)	Peak position
US Top R&B/Hip-Hop Albums (Billboard)	57
