= ATIC Records =

British independent record label

- Founded: 2006
- Founder: Andy Turner (a.k.a. Aim) and Nicole Vergel de Dios (a.k.a. Niko)
- Genre: Electronic
- Country of origin: UK
- Location: Manchester
- Official website: http://www.aticrecords.com

ATIC Records is an independent record label formed by British musician, DJ and producer, Aim (Andy Turner) and Niko (Nicole Vergel de Dios). They left Grand Central Records in early 2005 and started ATIC Records in June 2006.

As there had been limited funds available to promote his releases and attract guest performers, Turner had decided to move away from Grand Central prior to that label's collapse. Rather than sign to a new label, Turner decided to form his own, and in doing so gained greater control over the process of releasing his records and co-ordinating live performances.

Much of the artwork used for the label's releases and on the label's website was created by artist Alicia Vergel de Dios, sister of Niko.

== Artists ==
- Aim
- Death of the Neighbourhood
- Niko

== Current releases ==
- The first album to be released on ATIC was Aim's own Flight 602, released in the UK on 25 September 2006. It was preceded by the single, "Puget Sound". Unlike his previous albums, Flight 602 featured no guest rappers, and is a more instrumental affair.
- After Grand Central Records' demise, the copyright for Aim's records reverted to Turner's ownership. He re-released his two studio albums Cold Water Music and Hinterland on ATIC in 2007, adding b-sides as extra tracks to each. He also re-released his singles collection Means of Production.
- The label's second new album release was a self-titled double-album from Stephen Jones' project, Death of the Neighbourhood, released in November 2008. Jones had previously worked with Aim, providing vocals for the track "Good Disease" from the album Hinterland.
- In February 2009, the debut album from Gripper was released, A Life Of Consummate Ease. The album features soul-based music from across the alternative spectrum, taking in beats, breaks, hip hop, psych, soul, funk, Latin, electronica, dub and deep house.
- The debut album from Cumbrian band The Witch and the Robot (often shortened in print to TWATr), On Safari was released on 28 September 2009. Unlike the instrumental hip hop of Aim, Gripper and their previous compatriots, TWATr's music is a modern guitar-based take on indie folk, and has been likened to bands such as British Sea Power and Gorky's Zygotic Mynci.
- Crowhead is the new recording name of Christian Wood (a.k.a. Woody), who had previously released music on Grand Central Records under the recording name, The Nudge. Wood is a DJ from Salford, Greater Manchester. As The Nudge, he released two 12" singles and released some additional tracks and remixes on Grand Central's compilation albums. As Crowhead, Wood had released 2 singles to date, Best Kept Secret (I Guess) (August 2009) and The Bends EP (September 2009). The debut Crowhead album, Born With Teeth, was recorded in The Nest, his Manchester studio, and features rappers MC Kwasi, Mikey D.O.N. (of Krispy 3) and Rusty Ps, as well as label-mate, Niko.
- A compilation album from the label, entitled Follow the Outline, was released on 25 January 2010. This featured rare and unreleased tracks from the label's artist roster.
- Hate & Love was released in 2012. Niko's second album was produced by Aim. 'The Daddy Remix' feat QNC was the first single from this release.
- DOTN REDUX from Death of the Neighbourhood was released on Christmas Eve 2012.

== Future releases ==
- Aim is working as producer on fellow former-Grand Central artist and collaborator, Niko's second album, and on Sevens' forthcoming debut.
- Aim is preparing tracks for his fifth album of studio material, which will feature collaborations with QNC, Mikey D.O.N, Death of the Neighbourhood and James Yorkston.
- Gripper has returned to the studio to begin work on his second album. It is expected to be released in 2010.
- Aim has also started a new collaboration with the band Paperboy. Vocals are performed by Justin Helliwell, the singer from The Chelsea Flower Show, the fledgling band the pair were both members of in their younger days.
