= Hinterland (Aim album) =

Studio album by Aim
- Released: 26 February 2002
- Studios: Speed Limit Studios; Grand Central Studios (Manchester, England); Unique Studios (New York, New York); Stephen Jones' house
- Genres: Hip hop; trip hop; electronica
- Length: 60:14
- Label: Grand Central
- Producer: Aim

Aim chronology
Cold Water Music (1999)	Hinterland (2002)	Stars on 33 (2002)

Professional ratings
Review scores
Source	Rating
AllMusic	4/5 stars
Drowned in Sound	9/10
Entertainment Weekly	B
The Guardian	4/5 stars
Muzik	4/5
NME	8/10
Q	3/5 stars
Resident Advisor	5/5

Hinterland is the second studio album by British musician Aim, released on 26 February 2002 by Grand Central Records.

The album spent one week on the UK Albums Chart at number 47.

== Track listing ==
No.	Title	Length
1.	"Intro"	1:15
2.	"The Girl Who Fell Through the Ice" (featuring Kate Rogers)	6:17
3.	"What Do People Do All Day"	5:15
4.	"No Restriction" (featuring Souls of Mischief)	4:05
5.	"Fall Break"	4:45
6.	"Guimar"	4:18
7.	"Good Disease" (featuring Stephen Jones)	4:23
8.	"The Omen" (featuring Diamond D)	4:48
9.	"Linctus"	5:06
10.	"Vipco"	5:30
11.	"A Twilight Zone"	3:19
12.	"From a Seaside Town"	5:59
13.	"Hinterland"	5:14
Total length:		60:14

2007 ATIC Records re-issue bonus tracks
No.	Title	Length
14.	"Mag"	4:02
15.	"Peru"	3:54
16.	"Nightlife" (featuring Substantial)	3:59
Total length:		72:09

== Personnel ==
Credits for Hinterland adapted from album liner notes.

- Aim – arrangement, production, design

Additional musicians

- Chris Cruiks – drums
- Rick Walker - bandurria
- Diamond D – performance
- Stephen Jones – performance, recorder
- Kate Rogers – performance
- Sneaky – bass, cello
- Souls of Mischief – performance
- Phil Turner – bass, guitar
- Danny Ward – drums
- Roger Wickham – flute

Production

- Steve Christian – recording
- Martin Desai – engineering, recording
- Nilesh Patel – mastering

Design

- Gripper – design
- Nick Fry – design

Management

- Darren Laws – A&R
- Mark Rae – A&R

== Charts ==
Chart (2002)	Peak position
Scottish Albums (Official Charts)	33
UK Albums (Official Charts)	47
UK Independent Albums (Official Charts)	4
