= Stars on 33 =

Aim: Stars on 33

Compilation album by Aim
- Released: 4 November 2002
- Genre: Hip hop, electronica
- Label: Fat City Recordings; FCCD010

Aim chronology
Hinterland (2001)	Aim: Stars on 33 (2002)	Means of Production (2003)

Stars on 33 was the first DJ mix album mixed by Aim. The album was released in 2002 on the Fat City Recordings label.

== Track listing ==
1. "It's a Sin to Go Away" – We All Together
2. "The F Word" (RJD2 Remix) – Cannibal Ox
3. "Wasting Time" – Fingathing
4. "Cross My Palm She Whispered" – Cherrystones
5. "I Walk the Earth" – King Biscuit Time
6. "Ooh Lawd" – Jazzy Grooves
7. "Boss on the Boat" – Tosca
8. "Interlude 12" – Sidewinder
9. "Chocolates and Cheese" – Jon Kennedy
10. "Cock'd Back" – K Terrorbul
11. "Cold Water Music" (Deadbeats Remix) – Aim
12. "Phantasm" – Aim
13. "Never My Love" – Tom Scott
