= Another Late Night: Rae & Christian =

Compilation album by Rae & Christian
- Released: 1 March 2001
- Genre: Electronica, hip hop
- Label: Azuli, Kinetic
- Producer: Rae & Christian

Rae & Christian chronology
Sleepwalking (2001)	Another Late Night: Rae & Christian (2001)	Nocturnal Activity (2002)

Another Late Night chronology
Howie B (2001)	Rae & Christian (2001)	Zero 7 (2002)

Professional ratings
Review scores
Source	Rating
AllMusic	2.5/5 stars

Another Late Night: Rae & Christian is the second DJ mix album, mixed by Grand Central Records artists Rae & Christian. It was released on 1 March 2001 on Late Night Tales in the UK and on Kinetic Records in the USA. It was the third in the Another Late Night / Late Night Tales series of DJ mixes, each CD being mixed by a different DJ or recording artist, including Zero 7, Groove Armada, Tommy Guerrero, The Flaming Lips and Jamiroquai.

== Track listing ==
1. "Heavy Worker" - Trendsetter
2. "Copenhagen (Claimin' Respect)" - The Boulevard Connection
3. "Come On" - Joshua
4. "Put That on My Momma" - Riton
5. "Introlude" - Dubble D
6. "100 Million Ways" - Nash
7. "Straight No Filter" (Only Child Remix) - Fumi
8. "Take Ya Time" - Zum
9. "Four (4 x 3)" (Mr. Scruff Remix) - Capoeira Twins
10. "I Pink I'm Going Squeezy" - Bushy vs. Sonic Boo
11. "Roll Call" - Pablo
12. "Got to Be Me" (Timezone Dub) - H_{2}O
13. "Strudel Strut" - Aromadozeski Therapy
14. "Samba" (Rae & Christian Remix) - Faze Action
15. "Flashlight" - Rae & Christian
16. "Mary Jane" - Rick James
17. "California Dreamin'" - Jose Feliciano
