= Means of Production =

Compilation album by Aim
- Released: 29 April 2003
- Recorded: 1995–1998
- Genres: Hip hop, electronica
- Length: 57:48
- Labels: Grand Central Records; GCCD119
- Producer: Aim

Aim chronology
Stars on 33 (2002)	Means of Production (2003)	FabricLive.17 (2004)

Professional ratings
Review scores
Source	Rating
Allmusic	link

Means Of Production is a compilation album of early 12" and EP releases by Aim, recorded between 1995 and 1998.

== Track listing ==
1. "Loop Dreams" – 5:30
2. "Diggin' Dizzy" – 5:33
3. "Let the Funk Ride" – 5:11
4. "Original Stuntmaster" – 6:33
5. "Concentrate" – 5:51
6. "Just Passin' Through" – 6:17
7. "Soul Dive (All City mix)" – 7:06
8. "Phantasm" – 6:15
9. "Coast Road" – 3:56
10. "Demonique" – 5:36

== Album cover ==
The album's cover photograph depicts a locomotive from the fleet used to draw the Trans-Siberian Express through Russia.

== Personnel ==
- Aim – Arranger, Producer, Sleeve Art, Scratching
- Mandy Parnell – Mastering
- Steve Christian – Engineer, Mixing
- Mark Rae – Scratching

== See also ==
- For more information on the track "Demonique", see Cold Water Music.
