= And the Big Red Nebula Band =

Studio album by Fingathing
- Released: 10 May 2004 (UK); 29 September 2004 (U.S.)
- Genre: Jazz/Hip-Hop
- Length: 59:09 (UK); 84:07 (U.S.)
- Labels: Grand Central Records (UK); GCCD127; Ninja Tune (U.S.); ZEN53

Fingathing chronology
| Superhero Music (2002) | And the Big Red Nebula Band (2004) | Time Capsule (2005) |

Professional ratings
Review scores
| Source | Rating |
|---|---|
| Pitchfork | 7.8/10 |
| RapReviews.com | 8.5/10 |

And the Big Red Nebula Band was the third album by Fingathing. It was released in May 2004 on Grand Central Records in the UK, and licensed from them by Ninja Tune in the U.S. & Canada.

== Track listing ==
1. "Walk In Space" – 5:01
2. "Reanimo" – 4:52
3. "Lava" – 4:32
4. "Open A Door" – 1:27
5. "Themes From The Big Red" – 5:18
6. "Bolus" – 4:42
7. "Rock The Whole Planet" – 3:39
8. "Big Bang" – 4:41
9. "Cluster Buster" – 5:10
10. "Lady Nebula" – 3:44
11. "Music To Watch Aliens By" – 2:47
12. "Synergy" – 5:29
13. "Return To ERT" – 7:47

In the UK, a Best of compilation entitled Time Capsule: The First Five Years of Fingathing has since been released. However, the American edition of And The Big Red Nebula Band contains a bonus audio CD, also called Time Capsule, but only containing 5 tracks:

== Track list for Time Capsule bonus CD ==
1. "Head 2 Head" – 4:09 ^{[1]}
2. "Big Monsters Crush Cities" – 5:54 ^{[1]}
3. "Wasting Time" – 5:53 ^{[2]}
4. "You Fly Me" – 3:11 ^{[1]}
5. "Superhero Music" – 5:51 ^{[2]}

== Notes ==
1. Taken from The Main Event (album) LP (2000).
2. Taken from the Superhero Music LP (2002).
