= Time Capsule (Fingathing album) =

Compilation album by Fingathing
- Released: 19 September 2005
- Genres: Rap, British rap
- Length: 61:12
- Label: Grand Central

Fingathing chronology
And The Big Red Nebula Band (2002)	Time Capsule (2005)

Time Capsule, subtitled The First Five Years of Fingathing, is a compilation of Fingathing's first three albums. It was released by Grand Central Records in September 2005. The American edition of the album And the Big Red Nebula Band also has a bonus album called Time Capsule but only has five tracks.

== Track listing ==
1. "Head to Head" – 4:10
2. "Wasting Time" – 5:54
3. "Drunken Master" – 4:19
4. "Slippin'" (featuring Veba) – 5:18
5. "Music to Watch Aliens By" – 2:50
6. "Ffathead" – 3:20
7. "Big Monsters Crush Cities" – 6:00
8. "Superhero Music" – 5:52
9. "Synergy" – 5:32
10. "Slop" – 3:51
11. "Don't Turn Around" – 5:53
12. "You Fly Me" – 3:11
13. "Walk in Space" – 5:02
