= Niko (musician) =

American musician

- Born: Nicole Vergel De Dios
- Origin: Seattle, Washington, United States
- Genres: Electronic dance
- Occupation: Singer Songwriter Producer Label Manager at ATIC Records
- Years active: 2002–present
- Labels: ATIC Records 2005–present Grand Central 2002–2005
- Website: Niko at ATIC Records

Nicole Vergel De Dios, known by her stage name Niko, is an American musician. She was born in Seattle, Washington to Japanese and Spanish, Norwegian, German, Filipino parents.

She completed a Jazz and Contemporary Music Degree from the New School University in New York City, prior to signing to Grand Central Records independent record label in 2002.

She worked as musical supervisor and featured artist on the film Take It From Me for Public Broadcasting Service (PBS) Public television station.

She was based in Brooklyn, New York City before immigrating to the UK. Her debut album, Life On Earth, was produced mainly by fellow former Grand Central artist, Aim as well as Mr. Scruff and Riton.

Niko co-founded ATIC Records in 2005 with Aim (Andy Turner) and co-wrote and performed vocals on several tracks for Aim's 2006 album Flight 602. Her own second album, produced by Aim and herself, was released on ATIC in early 2008. Niko also performed vocals live for Aim's 10-piece touring band throughout 2007, which included a performance at Glastonbury Festival. and Shepherds Bush Empire.

== Discography ==
- Sound Off! 12" (2002, Cat no: GC 159)
- You're My Favourite Music 12"(2003, Cat no: GC 166)
- Shifting 12" (2004, Cat no: GC 181)
- Life On Earth (August 2004, Cat. no: GCCD130)
- ATIC Sampler Vol. 1 (2005. Cat. no: ATIC001/ATIC001DB)
- Follow the Outline (Jan 2010, Cat. no:ATICCD008/ATICDB008)
- The Daddy Remix feat QNC (March 2012, Cat. no: ATIC014DB)
- You're So Boring (March 2012, Cat. no.: ATIC015D)
- Hate & Love (July 2012, Cat. no: ATICLP011, ATICCD011/ATICDB011)
- You Used To Have Her (August 23, 2021, Cat. no ATIC019)

== Appearances ==
- ADNY 'Beautiful Boy','You Are My Light' Clear Vision EP (WAVE Music, Cat no: WM50080-1)
- Mr Scruff's track Come Alive from the album Trouser Jazz
- Only Child's tracks Show Me Love and Love's Reprise from the album Solitaire
- Aim's Flight 602 album 'Intro', 'Northwest', 'Puget Sound', 'Smile','Landlord', 'Aberdeen'
- Crowhead's album Born With Teeth 'The Bends'
- Aim & QNC's album 'The Habit of a Lifetime (And How To Kick It)' 'The More I Get (The More I Want)'
