= Pure Poverty =

Studio album by Poor Righteous Teachers
- Released: September 3, 1991
- Recorded: 1990−1991
- Genre: Hip hop
- Length: 52:26
- Label: Profile
- Producer: Tony D

Poor Righteous Teachers chronology
Holy Intellect (1990)	Pure Poverty (1991)	Black Business (1993)

Pure Poverty is the second album by the American hip hop group Poor Righteous Teachers, released in 1991. "Shakiyla [JRH]" was released as a single.

== Production ==
The album was produced by Tony D. "I'm Comin' Again" references the philosophy of Black Muslims.

== Critical reception ==
Professional ratings
Review scores
Source	Rating
AllMusic	4/5 stars
The Encyclopedia of Popular Music	3/5 stars

The Washington Post wrote that "Tony D has put together some more muscular grooves, and Wise Intelligent swift-lips with authority, occasionally doing it dance hall style." Newsday deemed the album "Muslim rap at its best, with a strong reggae dancehall feel," and listed it as one of the best albums of 1991.

AllMusic noted that "if it weren't for the spare, airtight beats and the dexterous samples, their lyrics of cultural awareness, self-sufficiency and religious discipline would probably have fallen flat."

== Track listing ==
#	Title
1	"Shakiyla [JRH]"
2	"Easy Star"
3	"Self-Styled Wisdom"
4	"Hot Damn I'm Great"
5	"Strictly Mash'ion"
6	"The Nation's Anthem"
7	"Each One Teach One"
8	"Rappin' Black"
9	"Just Servin' Justice"
10	"Freedom or Death"
11	"Methods of Droppin' Mental"
12	"Pure Poverty"
13	"I'm Comin' Again"

== Album chart positions ==
Year	Album	Chart positions	
Year	Album	Billboard 200	Top R&B/Hip Hop Albums
1991	Pure Poverty	155	23

== Singles chart positions ==
Year	Song	Chart positions		
Year	Song	Billboard Hot 100	Hot R&B/Hip-Hop Singles & Tracks	Hot Rap Singles
1991	"Shakiyla [JRH]"	-	61	9
