= Northern Sulphuric Soul =

Studio album by Rae & Christian
- Released: 5 October 1998
- Genre: Electronica; hip hop
- Label: Grand Central
- Producer: Steve Christian; Mark Rae

Rae & Christian chronology
Northern Sulphuric Soul (1998)	Blazing the Crop (1999)

Alternative cover
- United States edition

Alternative cover
- Remastered edition

Professional ratings
Review scores
Source	Rating
AllMusic	4/5 stars
Mojo	3/5 stars
Muzik	5/5 stars
Q	4/5 stars
Select	3/5
The Times	9/10
Uncut	4/5 stars

Northern Sulphuric Soul is the debut studio album by English electronic music duo Rae & Christian, released on 5 October 1998 by Grand Central Records.

In the United States, Northern Sulphuric Soul was released on the Sm:)e label, with a green version of the original orange sleeve. A remastered version was released on 12 January 2004, which contained three extra tracks and alternative sleeve art.

== Track listing ==
No.	Title	Length
1.	"Divine Sounds"	5:17
2.	"Anything U Want" (featuring QBall & Curt Cazal)	3:38
3.	"Swan Song (For a Nation)" (featuring Veba)	5:23
4.	"Now I Lay Me Down" (featuring YZ)	3:58
5.	"The Hush" (with Texas)	5:26
6.	"All I Ask" (featuring Veba)	4:49
7.	"Swimming Pool"	5:38
8.	"Fool" (featuring Veba)	5:22
9.	"Catch a Rude Awakening"	3:22
10.	"Play On (Grand Central)" (featuring Jungle Brothers)	3:54
11.	"Bring the Drama"	2:47
12.	"Flip the Mic" (featuring Jeru the Damaja)	4:45
13.	"Spellbound" (featuring Veba)	5:43

Remastered edition bonus tracks
No.	Title	Length
14.	"Time to Shine"	5:11
15.	"The Bacalau"	3:15
16.	"Premonition"	5:38

== Personnel ==
Rae & Christian

- Steve Christian – engineering, mixing, production
- Mark Rae – production, scratching, liner notes

== Charts ==
Chart (1998–1999)	Peak position
Australian Albums (ARIA)	64
UK Albums (OCC)	150
UK Independent Albums (OCC)	25
