= Black Business =

Studio album by Poor Righteous Teachers
- Released: September 14, 1993
- Studio: Epsilon (New Jersey)
- Genres: Political hip-hop; jazz rap
- Length: 52:16
- Label: Profile
- Producers: Poor Righteous Teachers; Tony D

Poor Righteous Teachers chronology
Pure Poverty (1991)	Black Business (1993)	The New World Order (1996)

Singles from Black Business
- 1. "Easy Star" Released: 1992; 2. "Nobody Move" Released: 1993

Professional ratings
Review scores
Source	Rating
AllMusic	3/5 stars
Chicago Tribune	2/4 stars
The Source	3.5/5 stars

Black Business is the third studio album by American hip-hop group Poor Righteous Teachers. It was released on September 14, 1993, via Profile Records. The recording sessions took place at Epsilon Studios in New Jersey. The album was produced by group members Culture Freedom, Father Shaheed and Wise Intelligent, and Tony D. It features contributions from Rahzii Hi-Power, Black Prince, Omar Superstar, and Power Israel.

In the United States, the album debuted at number 167 on the Billboard 200 and number 29 on the Top R&B/Hip-Hop Albums charts. Its single "Nobody Move" peaked at number 98 on the Hot R&B/Hip-Hop Songs and number 48 on the Hot Dance Music/Maxi-Singles Sales charts in the US.

== Track listing ==
No.	Title	Writer(s)	Producer(s)	Length
1.	"144K"	Scott Phillips; Timothy Grimes; David Jones Jr.	Poor Righteous Teachers	4:49
2.	"Da Rill Shit"	Phillips; T. Grimes; Kerry Williams; Israel Grimes; Andre Long; S. Dinkins III	Poor Righteous Teachers	5:07
3.	"Nobody Move"	Phillips; T. Grimes	Poor Righteous Teachers	4:28
4.	"Mi Fresh"	T. Grimes; Williams; Anthony Depula	Tony D	4:16
5.	"Here We Go Again"	Phillips; T. Grimes; Williams; Lana Moorer; Kirk Robinson; Nathaniel Robinson Jr.	Poor Righteous Teachers	4:22
6.	"Selah"	T. Grimes; Depula; Jones Jr.	Tony D	3:58
7.	"Black Business"	T. Grimes; Williams; Depula; Gerald Wilson	Tony D	3:55
8.	"Get off the Crack"	Phillips; T. Grimes; Williams; Lawrence Parker; Scott Sterling	Poor Righteous Teachers	3:22
9.	"None Can Test"	T. Grimes; Williams; Phillips	Culture Freedom	4:08
10.	"Ghetto We Love"	Phillips; T. Grimes	Poor Righteous Teachers	4:44
11.	"Rich Mon Time"	Phillips; T. Grimes; Williams; Curtis Mayfield	Poor Righteous Teachers	4:30
12.	"Lick Shots"	T. Grimes; Depula	Tony D	4:37
Total length:				52:16

Sample credits

- Track 1 intro contains a sample of "Shadrack" written by Robert MacGimsey and performed by Brook Benton.
- Track 5 contains a sample of "Bring the Noise" written by Hank Shocklee, Carl Ridenhour and Eric Sadler and performed by Public Enemy, a sample of "10% Dis" performed by MC Lyte, and a sample of "Here We Go (Live at the Funhouse)" performed by Run-DMC.
- Track 7 contains a sample of "Viva Tirado" performed by the 5th Dimension.
- Track 11 contains a sample of "Hard Times" performed by Curtis Mayfield.

== Personnel ==
- Kerry "Culture Freedom" Williams – producer (tracks: 1–3, 5, 8–11), executive producer
- Scott "Father Shaheed" Phillips – producer (tracks: 1–3, 5, 8, 10, 11), engineering, executive producer
- Timothy "Wise Intelligent" Grimes – producer (tracks: 1–3, 5, 8, 10, 11), executive producer
- David "Rahzii Hi-Power" Jones Jr. – additional vocals (tracks: 1, 6)
- "Power Israel" Grimes – additional vocals (track 2)
- Andre "Black Prince" Long – additional vocals (track 2)
- S. "Omar Superstar" Dinkins III – additional vocals (track 2)
- Anthony "Tony D" Depula – producer (tracks: 4, 6, 7, 12)
- Tom Zepp – engineering
- Herb Powers Jr. – mastering
- Rebecca Meek – art direction, design
- Klaus Schönwiese – photography

== Album chart positions ==
Chart (1993)	Peak position
US Billboard 200	167
US Top R&B/Hip-Hop Albums (Billboard)	29

== Singles chart positions ==
Year	Song	Hot R&B/Hip-Hop Singles & Tracks
1993	"Nobody Move"	98
