= St. Eustacia (album) =

Studio album by Kate Rogers
- Released: 23 February 2004
- Genre: Downtempo, acoustic
- Length: 50:49
- Label: Grand Central Records

Kate Rogers chronology
Kate Rogers Vs Grand Central (2003)	St. Eustacia (2004)	Seconds (2005)

St. Eustacia is the second album by singer Kate Rogers, and her debut album of original material. It was recorded in her native Canada. The album title takes its name from the Caribbean island of Sint Eustatius.

Rogers' earlier recordings had almost all been as the featured vocalist on other Grand Central artists' tracks. In defining her own sound, Rogers moved away from the usual electronic sound of the label. Whilst maintaining the melancholic vocals and downtempo style, most of the tracks on St. Eustacia were backed up by the acoustic guitar of guitarist and co-writer Matt Bannister.

It was released on Grand Central Records in 2004.

== Track listing ==
1. "Welcome" – 4:33
2. "Not Ten Years Ago" – 4:04
3. "Mighty" – 5:56
4. "The Apology" – 3:07
5. "Odyssey" – 4:46
6. "Nothing Appeals To Me Here" – 5:21
7. "Sidelines" – 5:04
8. "Joan" – 4:17
9. "Sum It Up" – 3:21
10. "This Collective" – 4:59
11. "St. Eustacia" – 5:21
