= Superhero Music =

Studio album by Fingathing
- Released: 24 June 2002
- Genre: Hip-Hop
- Length: 72:32
- Label: Grand Central; GCCD114

Fingathing chronology
The Main Event (2000)	Superhero Music (2002)	And The Big Red Nebula Band (2004)

Professional ratings
Review scores
Source	Rating
AllMusic	3/5 stars

Superhero Music is the second album by Fingathing, released on Grand Central Records in June 2002. Justin Kleinfeld of CMJ compared the album's sound to DJ Shadow and James Lavelle. Kleinfeld described the album as "awesome".

== Track listing ==
1. "Intro" – 0:40
2. "Ogre" – 5:07
3. "Drunken Master II" – 5:33
4. "Scrap" – 4:06
5. "The Answer" – 0:32
6. "Criminal Robots" – 4:48
7. "Wasting Time" – 5:53
8. "Pianogoon" – 2:40
9. "Bad Gameshow Host" – 3:22
10. "Bags Boogie" – 1:17
11. "Haze" – 7:11
12. "Skitch" – 0:51
13. "Once Upon A Time In The East" – 3:26
14. "Superhero Music" – 5:51
15. "Spacecrumbs" – 1:53
16. "The Diss" – 0:11
17. "Imperial Mince" – 1:15
18. "Don't Turn Around" – 5:51
19. "Remember This Too" – 0:26
20. "Alright Charlie!" – 2:46
21. "The Chase" – 4:57
22. "Epitaph" – 3:56
