= Chiclete com banana =

Chiclete com banana may refer to:

- Chiclete com Banana, a Brazilian band
- "Chiclete com banana" (song), a song by Jackson do Pandeiro
