= Holy Intellect =

Studio album by Poor Righteous Teachers
- Released: May 29, 1990
- Recorded: 1989−1990
- Genre: Hip hop
- Label: Profile; Arista 01515-11289
- Producer: Tony D; Eric IQ Gray

Poor Righteous Teachers chronology
Holy Intellect (1990)	Pure Poverty (1991)

Holy Intellect is the debut album by hip-hop group Poor Righteous Teachers, famous for its pro-Five-Percenter messages. It includes "Rock Dis Funky Joint", which sampled "Slippin' into Darkness" by War, a 1970s funk band.

The album is broken down track-by-track by Poor Righteous Teachers in Brian Coleman's book Check the Technique.

== Critical reception ==
Professional ratings
Review scores
Source	Rating
AllMusic	4.5/5 stars

The Washington Post stated that Poor Righteous Teachers "promote black unity, a 'knowledge of self', which, combined with swinging grooves, tasteful samples and swift rapping, makes for a funky, uplifting experience." The New York Times noted the "nimble, free-associative raps over riffs that change just often enough".

In 1998, the album was selected as one of The Source's "100 Best Rap Albums".

== Track listing ==
- All tracks produced by Tony D, except tracks 8 and 10 produced by Eric IQ Gray

#	Title	Performer (s)
1	"Can I Start This?"	Wise Intelligent, Culture Freedom
2	"Rock Dis Funky Joint"	Wise Intelligent, Culture Freedom
3	"Strictly Ghetto"	Wise Intelligent, Culture Freedom
4	"Holy Intellect"	Wise Intelligent, Culture Freedom
5	"Shakiyla"	Wise Intelligent, Culture Freedom
6	"Time to Say Peace"	Wise Intelligent, Culture Freedom
7	"Style Dropped/Lessons Taught"	Wise Intelligent, Culture Freedom
8	"Speaking Upon a Blackman"	Wise Intelligent, Culture Freedom
9	"So Many Teachers"	Wise Intelligent, Culture Freedom
10	"Word from the Wise"	Wise Intelligent, Culture Freedom
11	"Butt Naked Booty Bless"	Wise Intelligent, Culture Freedom
12	"Poor Righteous Teachers"	Wise Intelligent, Culture Freedom

== Charts ==
=== Weekly charts ===
Chart (1990)	Peak position
US Billboard 200	142
US Top R&B/Hip-Hop Albums (Billboard)	17

=== Year-end charts ===
Chart (1990)	Position
US Top R&B/Hip-Hop Albums (Billboard)	42

=== Singles ===
Year	Song	Hot R&B/Hip-Hop Singles & Tracks	Hot Rap Singles
1990	"Rock Dis Funky Joint"	17	4
1990	"Holy Intellect"	71	16
