= Flight 602 =

Flight 602 may refer to:

- Flight 602 (album), an album by the band AIM
- "Flight 602", a song on Chicago III by the band Chicago
- Iberia Flight 602, which crashed in 1972
- Lionair Flight 602, which crashed in 1998
