= All I Ask (disambiguation) =

All I Ask is a 2015 song by Adele.

All I Ask may also refer to:

- "All I Ask", a song by the Blackbyrds from the album City Life, 1975
- "All I Ask", a song by Crowded House from the album Woodface, 1991
- "All I Ask", a song by Kenny Loggins from the album The Unimaginable Life, 1997
- "All I Ask", a song by Rae & Christian from the album Northern Sulphuric Soul, 1999
- "All I Ask", a song by Rosita Vai from the album Golden, 2005
- All I Ask, a 1964 romantic novel by Anne Weale
- All I Ask, a 2020 mystery novel by Eva Crocker

== See also ==
- All I Ask of You
