= Novi Sad Jazz Festival =

- Genre: jazz
- Dates: end of November every year
- Locations: Novi Sad, Serbia
- Years active: 1999 - present

Novi Sad Jazz Festival (Serbian Cyrillic: Новосадски Џез фестивал or Novosadski jazz festival) is an annual jazz festival in Novi Sad, Serbia. It is organized by the Novi Sad Cultural Centre. The festival was first held in 1999 in the Novi Sad Cultural Centre. Over the years, the festival has grown, and as of 2004, the festival was moved to the Serbian National Theatre.

== History ==
The first jazz festival was held in the Cultural Centre of Novi Sad, from November 25 to November 27, 1999. It was quite modest, with a majority of jazz performers coming from the "Third Yugoslavia", of which Novi Sad was a part, at the time. In 2000, the second festival was held over three days, from November 23 until November 25. In 2001, the organizers added workshops and exhibitions to the festival. In 2003, the festival was held over five days, but the organizers were forced to change its location, due to the popularity of the festival. Since 2004, the festival has been held in Novi Sad's Serbian National Theatre.

== Performers ==
Over the past seven years, the main concert programme has featured ensembles and musicians from many European countries, the United States, as well as other parts of the world. Artists from the countries of former Yugoslavia who have performed at the festival include: Stjepko Gut, Miša Blam, Duško Gojković, Bora Roković, Jovan Joe Miković, Miloš Mike Krstić, Vojislav Brković, Uroš Šecerov, Marko Đordjević and Aleksandar Milosević, among others. More than 100 ensembles from Serbia and abroad have performed at the Novi Sad Jazz Festival for the past seven years, and nearly 600 musicians, including Johnny Griffin, Jimmy Cobb, Al Foster, Benny Bailey, Andy Bay, Tania Maria, Trilok Gurtu, Steve Coleman, Keith Copeland, Eddie Henderson, Al Di Meola, Jerry Bergonzi, Kenny Garrett, Erik Rothenstein, Sheila Jordan, and Curtis Fuller to name a few.
