= The Main Event (album) =

Studio album by Fingathing
- Released: 20 November 2000
- Genre: Hip-hop
- Length: 54:55
- Label: Grand Central; GCCD108
- Producer: Fingathing

Fingathing chronology
The Main Event (2000)	Superhero Music (2002)

The Main Event is the debut album by Fingathing. It was released in 2000 on Grand Central Records.

== Production ==
The album was produced by Fingathing's DJ Peter Parker and Sneaky; Parker provided the scratching, and Sneaky played double bass. Many of the tracks are about wrestling.

== Critical reception ==
Professional ratings
Review scores
Source	Rating
AllMusic	3/5 stars
The Encyclopedia of Popular Music	3/5 stars
The Guardian	3/5 stars

AllMusic wrote that "it's rare that discs released by scratch or battle DJs ever hold a candle to their respective live performances, but here Fingathing definitely defy convention." The Guardian wrote that some of the songs "are lushly atmospheric, while others have the rudimentary feel and brutal minimalism of earliest hip hop."

== Track listing ==
1. "Intro" – 0:43
2. "Check It Out" – 2:58
3. "Big Monsters Crush Cities" – 5:56
4. "Come On Girls" – 1:50
5. "Head to Head" – 4:08
6. "How to Smoke" (featuring DJ Noize) – 4:11
7. "Slappy's Tune" – 2:22
8. "Just Practice" (featuring Mr. Scruff) – 3:52
9. "Big Kid" – 2:40
10. "Remember This?" – 0:48
11. "You Fly Me" – 3:11
12. "Ffathead" – 3:20
13. "Slippin" (featuring Veba) – 5:14
14. "A Light Refreshment" – 1:11
15. "Crowd Pleasers" (featuring DJ Noize) – 3:42
16. "Ffling" – 3:42
17. "The Final Bout" – 5:07
