= Boca 45 =

British DJ

Scott Hendy, also known as Boca 45, is a DJ and producer from Bristol, UK.

== Career ==
Since 2004 he has been signed to the independent record label, Grand Central Records. Prior to this, he released material on Hombré Recordings, Illicit Records, Superslick Stereo Sounds and High Noon Records.

The name is derived from the Argentine football team Boca Juniors, and a common name for a 7" single (so called because of the speed, in revolutions per minute, that a record of this size plays at).

After releasing his debut album, Pitch Sounds, Boca 45 recorded two DJ mix albums that were released on Ninja Tune. Both albums contain 45 tracks and all tracks were taken from 7" singles.

Boca 45 has also recorded with DJ Andy Smith under the title Dynamo Productions. They released one album entitled Analogue. He has also worked with vocalist Gee as Malakai and later Malachai.

In May 2006, Hendy began touring with his new live band The Boca45 Experience, which features former member of The Federation, Stepchild and Kelvin Swaby

The second Boca 45 album, Vertigo Sounds was released in the Autumn of 2006.

== Discography ==
- Pitch Sounds (4 October 2004, Grand Central Records, GCCD133)
- Boca Plays His 45s Vol. 1 (2005, Ninja Tune, BOCA001)
- Boca's Jukebox! (9 November 2005, Ninja Tune, BOCACD1)
- Vertigo Sounds (2006), Unique Records, UNIQUE 117-2)
- Lessons in Breakbeat (2009) (Pedigree Cuts, Switchstance Recordings)
- Dig Eat Beats Repeat (2015) (Digga Please?)
- Carousel ft. DJ Woody (2017) (Bocawoody Recordings)
- Forty Five ft. Emskee and Louis Baker (July 12, 2019) (Mass Appeal Records)
