= Central Heating (Grand Central album) =

Compilation album by Grand Central Records
- Released: 25 November 1996 (Original); 9 February 2004 (Re-release)
- Recorded: ?
- Genre: Hip-Hop/Electronica
- Length: 106:37
- Label: Grand Central Records; GCCD101 (Original); GCCD101R (Re-release); GCLP101R (Vinyl Re-release)
- Producer: Mark Rae?

Grand Central Records chronology
Frying The Fat (1995)	Central Heating (1996)	Central Reservations (1997)

Alternative cover
- Central Heating (re-issue)

Central Heating was the second compilation released by Grand Central Records. The two disc album was originally released in November 1996. It was re-released in February 2004 with alternative sleeve art.

== Disc one ==
1. "Central Introduction" – Tony D
2. "How Sweet It Is" – Mr. Scruff & Mark Rae
3. "Spellbound (featuring Veba" – Rae & Christian
4. "Second Street Gogo" – Tony D
5. "Hand of Doom (featuring Clita Johnrose)" – Andy Votel
6. "Through These Veins (featuring Afu Ra)" – Funky Fresh Few
7. "Pourquoi (featuring Buffy Brox)" – Only Child
8. "Good Advice" – Rae & Christian
9. "Rain (featuring Buffy Brox)" – Only Child
10. "It's Time Two (featuring Chubby Grooves)" – Tony D

== Disc two ==
1. "Original Stuntmaster" – Aim
2. "Hemlock'd" – Andy Votel
3. "You Mean Fantastic" – Funky Fresh Few
4. "Loopdreams" – Aim
5. "When We Get Together" – Tony D
6. "Gotta Have Her" – Mr. Scruff & Mark Rae
7. "Lunagroove" – Only Child
8. "Baseball Fury" – Rae & Christian
9. "Spooky Driver" – Andy Votel
10. "Souldive (All City mix)" – Aim
11. "Northern Sulphuric Soul" – Rae & Christian

== See also ==
- Grand Central Records compilations
