= Cultural Center of Novi Sad =

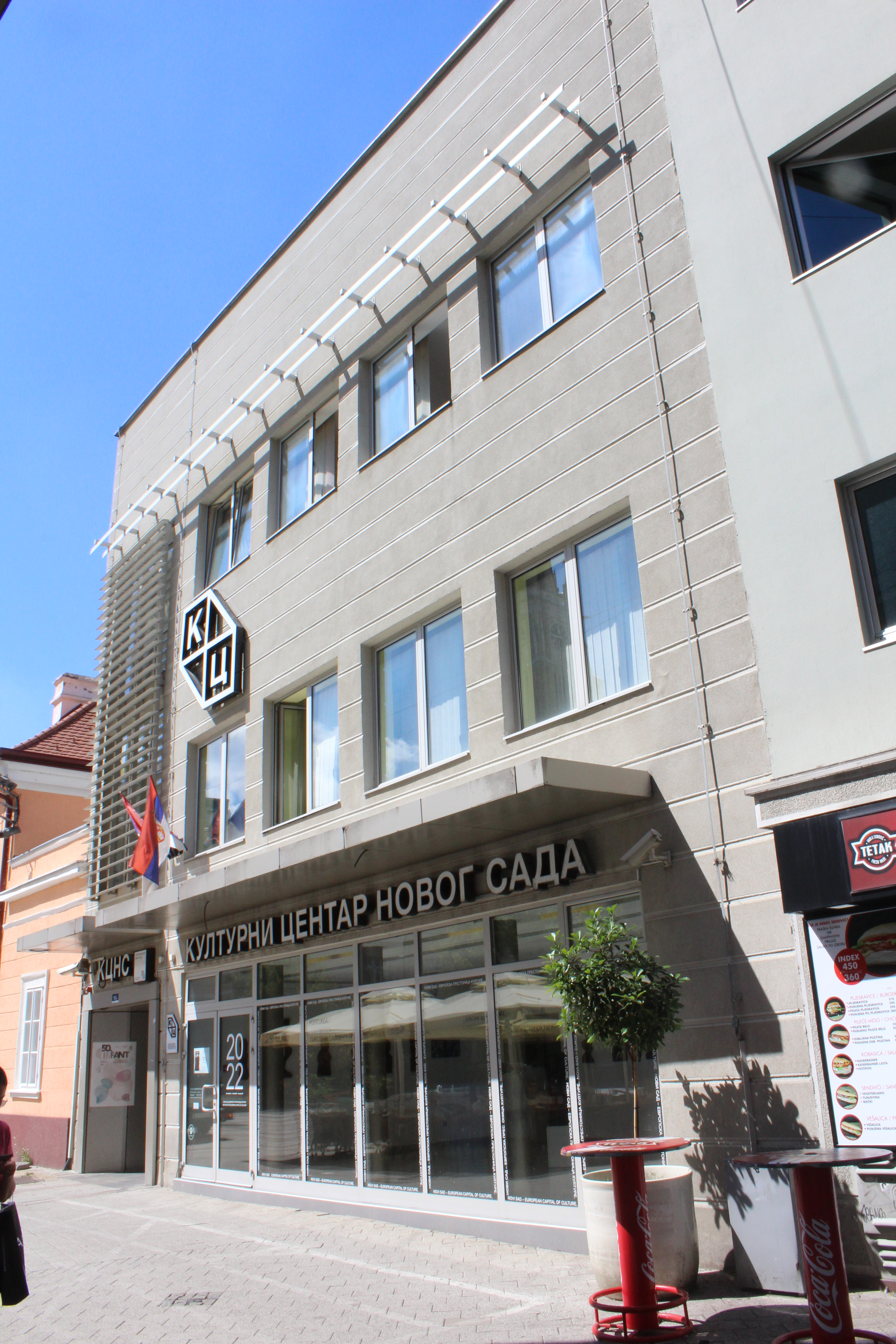
Building of the Cultural Center of Novi Sad

The Cultural Center of Novi Sad (Културни центар Новог Сада, Kulturni centar Novog Sada) is a cultural institution in Novi Sad, Serbia. It is located in Katolička Porta, in the Stari Grad district of central Novi Sad. It was founded by city council.

The cultural center organizes projects over various disciplines including arts and social sciences, such as exhibitions, literary programs, workshops, art cinema programs. Its biggest events are the Novi Sad Jazz Festival, International Festival of Alternative and New Theater (INFANT), Euro-In Film, Prosefest, and Poezika music festival.
