= Rusty Ps =

American hip hop group

- Also known as: Rusty Pelicans
- Origin: Milwaukee, WI
- Genres: Hip hop/rap
- Years active: 1995–present
- Labels: Rusty Ps Records; 4th Density Music
- Members: Phantom Channel (MC); Count Classic (MC); Madhatter (DJ); S Watson (Production)
- Past members: One Self, Dana Coppa
- Website: http://www.rustyps.com

The Rusty Ps is a hip hop/rap group based in Milwaukee, Wisconsin. Initially known as the Rusty Pelicans after forming in 1995, its membership currently consists of Phantom Channel (MC), Count Classic (MC), S Watson (production), and Madhatter (DJ).

== Members ==
=== Count Classic ===
Also known as "Caddilac", the Count is an original member of the Rusty Pelicans/Rusty Ps. Mcing since 1992, Count had been a member of various groups and crews until he, Phantom Channel, Oneself and Dana Coppafeel decided to start their own crew called "Rusty Pelicans", writing, recording and performing their own unique style of hip hop.

=== Phantom Channel ===
Phantom Channel has been emceeing since 1992 working in various groups and has been writing, recording and performing as an original member of the Rusty Pelicans/Rusty Ps since 1995. Phantom Channel was a featured emcee on the Recycled Future release, "The Nettle" (2005). He has also done a guest spot with Mic Virus (The Virus) on the M.A.K.E.S. Ent. Compilation, "Makes Sense" (2003). Currently, Phantom Channel is working on a collaborative project with The LMNTlyst, titled, The Lab Partners. An experimental project that finds PC expanding his repertoire and playing live drums and vocals throughout. No further information about this project is available at this time.

=== Madhatter ===
DJ Madhatter joined the Rusty Ps in the year 2002. He began deejaying in 1998 and moved to Milwaukee, WI from his hometown of Kenosha, WI. Jordan " Madhatter" Lee began playing drums and making music before the age of ten. His musical roots were deeply based in soul, funk and rhythm and blues, but were also inspired later in his teens by punk, ska, reggae, and rock. Jordan's roots in drumming and years of voice and theatre training, made the progression into working with hip hop a smooth one. Music has always been, and continues to be, the major building block of his life. Jordan now can be heard as one half of the weekday morning show on 88.9 WYMS Radio Milwaukee.

=== S Watson ===
S Watson has been producing for the Rusty Ps since 1997. All of his released work has been produced using the Akai MPC 2000, except the Rusty Pelicans first release, the "Prototype" single, which was produced using the Akai S-20. According to Watson, "music is love" and he intends to use it to bring "peace" to the human family.

== History ==
The story of the Rusty Ps begins in 1982 when S Watson attended kindergarten with the Phantom Channel. The two attended Neskara Elementary in Milwaukee, WI, for their first year of school. Watson, an import to Milwaukee from Chicago and Channel a Milwaukee native became good friends right off the bat but parted ways after this first year of school.

From there, Phantom Channel went on to attend school with the Count Classic. It was first grade at St. Sebastian's in Milwaukee. Count Classic soon moved to Madison WI.

Phantom Channel, remaining at "Sebs" for the rest of his grade school education soon reunited with S Watson in the 6th grade as Watson began attending St Sebastian's as well. They finished their elementary education there and parted ways for different high schools.

Count Classic returned from Madison and attended Nicolet High School. There he met Oneself and continued at Nicolet for his entire high school education.

Oneself, having left Nicolet after the first two years of high school, attended West Division High School. There he met Phantom Channel and Dana Coppafeel who had been attending that school since freshman year. Oneself reunited Channel with Classic, the old friends from first grade. They all graduated from their respective schools in 1995 and Phantom Channel and Mr. Smith went on to move into an apartment with their good friend Count Classic.

Already music lovers and hip hop "heads" the four, Classic, Channel, Oneself and Coppafeel, remained friends and having learned much of the culture of hip hop in high school began small freestyle sessions with other local aspiring rappers and also invested in a small beat machine, the DR-5. Meanwhile, S Watson went on to attend the University of Minnesota, Twin Cities. He left school after approximately 6 months and returned home.

Without any connections in Milwaukee, Watson called his old friend Phantom Channel and began hanging out with who would soon become the Rusty Pelicans. Watson remained in Milwaukee for 6 months and went on to attend a recording arts school, Full Sail, in Winter Park, FL.

It was during this time, 1996, that the Rusty Pelicans were taking shape in a basement apartment on Milwaukee's east side.

== Tours and performances ==
The Rusty Ps has toured nationally and internationally with groups such as The Pharcyde, Killa Kella -International Beat Box Champion and DJ Hype (Germany). As a supporting act, Rusty Ps has also performed with groups such as Run DMC, Eminem, The Roots, Common, Lupe Fiasco, Talib Kweli, Ludacris, Ice Cube, The Black Eyed Peas, Jurassic 5, Slick Rick, Digital Underground, Masta Ace, Elzhi of Slum Village, Hieroglyphics, Del the Funky Homosapien, Souls of Mischief, Casual, Styles of Beyond, The High & Mighty, The X-Ecutioners, Blackalicious, DJ Shadow, Latyrx, Nappy Roots, Brother Ali, Murs, and Atmosphere.

== Awards ==
=== WAMI (Wisconsin Area Music Industry) ===
The Rusty Ps is a three time WAMI award winner for the Best Hip-Hop/Rap category, in the years 2000, 2001 and 2006. With nominations in 1999, and 2002, 2008, 2009.

=== "Best of Milwaukee" ===
Voted "best of" Milwaukee hiphop / rap group by the readers of the Shepherd Express in the years 2000, 2001, 2002, 2003, 2005.

=== "88.9 Radio Milwaukee - Top 100 Songs of 2008" ===
The Rusty Ps single "Foundation" was voted in at #58 in the Top 100 Songs of 2008 by the listeners of the online poll conducted by 88.9 Radio Milwaukee.

=== "88.9 Radio Milwaukee - Milwaukee Music Awards 2009" ===
The Rusty Ps win the "Earwig Award" for catchiest song of the year.

== Album history ==
=== Prototype RPCP 12" ===
The first recorded effort by the Rusty Pelicans. Recorded at Walls Have Ears, Milwaukee, WI. Vocal recording, mix and master done at Hollywood Sound in Hollywood, CA. (1999)
RPCP stands for "Rusty Pelican, Civilized Person"

=== The Best Part ===
“The Best Part” is the first full-length CD project recorded by the Rusty Pelicans. Recorded at Bionic Studios, Milwaukee, WI. (1999)

=== Tread Water 12" ===
The second single recorded and released by the Rusty Pelicans in support of their album, "Out of Many". This single was released nationally as well internationally. (2000)

=== Out of Many ===
“Out of Many” is the second full-length CD release recorded by the Rusty Ps. Recorded at Bionic Studios, Milwaukee, WI. This album featured collaborations with The Pharcyde and Atmosphere and was released nationally as well internationally. (2001)

=== One ===
“One” is the third full-length CD release recorded by the Rusty Ps. Recorded at Bionic Studios, Milwaukee, WI. (2002)

=== Quickness 12" ===
Phantom Channel and Count Classic were featured emcees on this Grand Central Records(UK) release from the Nudge, a DJ/producer in London. "Quickness" was distributed throughout Europe and received critical acclaim in the London club scene. (2003)

=== Professional 12" ===
The third single release from the Rusty Ps. (2003)

=== Is It Live? 12" ===
The Rusty Ps licensed "Is It Live?", the B-side from the "Professional" single, to Grand Central Records (UK) which was released in Europe. This 12" also features a remix by Rob Smith of Smith & Mighty. (2004)

=== Rusty Ps vs. Milwaukee ===
“Rusty Ps vs. Milwaukee” is the fourth full-length release by the Rusty Ps. The Ps collaborated with some of the best talent of various musical genres from Milwaukee, including members of Def Harmonic, and The Mistreaters. (2005)

=== The Shape of Things to Come ===
"The Shape of Things to Come" is the P's fifth full-length release to date. Featuring production by S Watson, J Todd and D'Matikk who laid the backdrop for the P's signature stylings. DJ Madhatter is also featured throughout the album. (2008)

=== Unreleased Sweetness, Vol. 1 ===
"Unreleased Sweetness, Vol. 1" is the first installment of an ongoing series originally made available on the group's website, www.rustyps.com. A collection of rare, previously unreleased material spanning roughly from 2002-2007. (2008)

=== Best Kept Secret 12" ===
Phantom Channel and Count Classic were featured emcees on this Atic Records (UK) release from Crowhead (formerly the Nudge). The song will also be featured on the Crowhead full length "Born With Teeth." (2009)

=== Global Flow 12" ===
The Rusty Ps were recruited by two Germany based producers to contribute to their concept album, "Global Flow" featuring emcees from all parts of the world over the duo's production. The album also featured appearances by many other noted U.S. artists. (2010)

=== Get Love (iTunes exclusive) ===
Teaming up with guitarist Evan Christian, the Rusty Ps released "Get Love" as a single in 2011. The single has been in heavy rotation on 88.9 Radio Milwaukee. (2011)
