= Rinse & Repeat =

Single by Riton featuring Kah-Lo

from the album Foreign Ororo
- Released: 19 February 2016
- Genre: Deep house
- Length: 2:31
- Label: Riton

Riton singles chronology
"Need Your Love" (2015)	"Rinse & Repeat" (2016)	"Betta Riddim" (2016)

Kah-Lo singles chronology
"Rinse & Repeat" (2016)	"Betta Riddim" (2016)

"Rinse & Repeat" is a song by British DJ Riton featuring vocals from Kah-Lo. The song was released as a digital download in the United Kingdom on 19 February 2016.

The song entered the UK Singles Chart at number 13 and at number 2 on the UK Dance Chart. It was nominated for Best Dance Recording at the 2017 Grammy Awards.

== Charts ==
Chart performance for "Rinse & Repeat"
Chart (2016)	Peak position
Belgium (Ultratop 50 Flanders)	42
Belgium (Ultratip Bubbling Under Wallonia)	37
France (SNEP)	123
Scottish Singles Sales (Official Charts)	9
UK Singles (Official Charts)	13
UK Dance (Official Charts)	2

== Certifications ==
Certifications for "Rinse & Repeat"
Region	Certification	Certified units/sales
New Zealand (RMNZ)	Gold	15,000^{‡}
United Kingdom (BPI)	Gold	400,000^{‡}
^{‡} Sales+streaming figures based on certification alone.

== Release history ==
Release history for "Rinse & Repeat"
Region	Date	Format	Label
Ireland	26 February 2016	Digital download	Riton
United Kingdom	26 February 2016	Digital download	Riton
Netherlands	4 March 2016	Digital download	Ministry of Sound; Spinnin'
