= Avant Garde (Constant Deviants album) =

Studio album by Constant Deviants
- Released: May 12, 2015
- Recorded: 2014; SIX2SIX Studios (New York City)
- Genre: Hip hop
- Label: SIX2SIX Records
- Producer: Constant Deviants

Constant Deviants chronology
Diamond (2012)	Avant Garde (2015)	Omerta (2016)

Singles from Avant Garde
- 1. "Breathin'" Released: March 3, 2015; 2. "End All Be All" Released: July 28, 2015; 3. "Standards" Released: Aug 21, 2015

Avant Garde is the fourth studio album by American hip hop duo Constant Deviants. The album was released on May 12, 2015 by their label SIX2SIX Records. Avant Garde's production and mixing was entirely handled by the duo. It was supported by the singles "Breathin","End All Be All" and "Standards". The digital, compact disc, and vinyl format of the album contains fifteen tracks.

== Background and promotion ==
On March 3, 2015, Constant Deviants released "Breathin'", the first single from their fourth studio album. Along with its release, it was revealed the album would be titled Avant Garde and be released on May 12, 2015. It was also reported that the album would be produced and mixed by the duo, along with being released by their own imprint SIX2SIX Records, like their previous releases.

The duo stated that the album expanded on the concepts, samples used and attention to the sonics. On March 5, 2015, the music video was released for "Breathin'". On July 28, 2015, the album's second single "End All Be All" was premiered by EgotripLand and subsequently remixed by the Da Beatminerz. On August 21, 2015, the duo released the third single "Standards".

== Critical reception ==
Professional ratings
Review scores
Source	Rating
Hip Hop Foundation	4/5 stars
Sample Face UK	4/5 stars
Wordplay	4/5 stars
Sagi Hip Hop France	3.5/5 stars
Patricks Music	8.5/10 (L)

Upon its release, Avant Garde was met with generally positive reviews from music critics. Seth Pereira of Premiere Hip Hop said, "DJ Cutt’s production on the album is the very antithesis to the new pseudo genre that has been masquerading as Hip Hop. The vast soundscape that he creates really shows his expertise and that he remains true to the legends Pete Rock and DJ Premier. He takes us back to a time when diggin’ in the crates was the primary method for obtaining great samples and sounds, rather than attempting to breathe new life into tired soundpacks downloaded using Google." Ryan Proctor writing for Wordplay Magazine stated, "Drawing on life experiences as well as his passion for Hip-Hop, M.I.’s meticulously well-structured verses contain both world-weary lessons and gems of optimism, walking a captivating line between street reportage and gritty philosophy." Taytula Burke of SampleFace UK said, "This is definitely one for fans of well-constructed rhymes and beats you can get lost in. While staying true to their Golden Era roots, Constant Deviants have managed to deliver an album that is still accessible to those just beginning their exploration of hip hop."

Midwest Melly of GTPS said, "They are dedicated to the essence of golden era, preserving the art of hip hop while remaining fearless competitors immune to superficial trends. Listen to a Constant Deviants album and you will be reminded why the combination of smooth turntablism and strong wordplay is the ultimate classic recipe." Lafayette Hicks The Hip Hop Foundation stated, "M.I. is a talented lyricist that walks the thin line perfectly between being thought-provoking and not being overly complicated. He has a distinct elderly-statesman like voice that commands respect but still blends nicely with the production. The subject matter is versatile as he touches on the street life in one breath then comes right back with a more philosophical approach. It’s basically the duality of man that isn’t all good or all bad. One thing that really stuck out to me is M.I.’s hooks. They’re catchy and melodic, tying together his verses nicely and displaying his ability as a great songwriter as opposed to just a 16 bars rapper."

== Track listing ==
- All songs were produced by Constant Deviants.

No.	Title	Length
1.	"Avant Garde"	3:36
2.	"End All Be All"	3:54
3.	"Breathin'"	3:22
4.	"It's Like That" (feat.Aye Wun)	3:57
5.	"Machine Gun"	4:03
6.	"Side B"	3:33
7.	"IM Wit It"	3:48
8.	"IM Still Up!"	3:00
9.	"Which One"	2:08
10.	"U Know What"	3:44
11.	"Whatever U Call It"	3:45
12.	"Standards"	4:09
13.	"The Right Moment"	3:43
14.	"Whats Wrong Wit U"	2:39
15.	"M's 4 Milleniums"	2:11
