= Kah-Lo =

Nigerian singer-songwriter

- Born: Faridah Demola Seriki; November 2, 1992 (age 33); Lagos, Nigeria
- Education: Hofstra University
- Genres: Electronic, house
- Occupations: Singer-songwriter; Rapper
- Years active: 2016–present
- Labels: Riton Time, Entertainment One Music, Lagos Way Records
- Website: www.kahlomusic.com

Faridah Demola Seriki, (born November 2, 1992) known professionally as Kah-Lo is a Nigerian singer-songwriter, best known for her song "Fasta" and for her work on "Rinse and Repeat" with British DJ Riton. The track was nominated for Best Dance Recording at the 59th Grammy Awards. Together, she and Riton have released "Betta Riddim", "Money" ft. Mr. Eazi and Davido, and Triple J hits "Fake ID" and "Ginger".

Her debut single "Fasta" was released on 11 August 2017. The song was chosen as BBC Radio 1 DJ Annie Mac's hottest record in the world on 22 August 2017. Her collaborative album "Foreign Ororo" with Riton was released on 5 October 2018. Her debut solo album "Pain/Pleasure" was released on 8 September 2023.

== Biography ==
Seriki was born and raised in Lagos, Nigeria, where she attended Vivian Fowler Memorial College. In 2009, she moved to New York, where she graduated from Hofstra University in 2013 and worked marketing there. Through SoundCloud and Twitter, she started collaborating with Riton, starting her professional music career.

Her father was Ademola Rasaq Seriki, a prominent Nigerian politician.

== Discography ==
=== Albums ===
- Riton: Foreign Ororo (2018)
- Pain Pleasure (2023)

=== Extended plays ===
- The Arrival (2021)

=== Singles ===
- Riton: "Fasta" (2017)
- "Exit Sign" (2019)
- "Drag Me Out" (2022)
- "fund$" (2023)
- "Karma" (2023)
- "GD Woman" (2023)
- "Runaway" (2023)
- "Criminal" (with Alice Ivy and BJ the Chicago Kid)
- "Somersaults" (2025)
- "In This Bih'" (2026)

=== Features ===
- Riton: "Rinse & Repeat" (2016)
- Riton: "Betta Riddim" (2016)
- Riton: "Fake ID" (2017)
- Riton: "Ginger" (2018)
- Riton: "Up & Down" (2018)
- Michael Brun: "Spice" (2018)
- Riton, Mr Eazi: "Catching Feelings" (2018)
- Riton: "Bad Boy" (2018)
- Idris Elba: "Ballie" (2019)
- Diplo, Blond:ish: "Give Dem" (2019)
- Perto: “Bad Maybe Good” (2019)
- The Knocks: "Awa Ni" (2019)
- Michael Brun: "Melanin" (2020)
- Karma Fields, Associanu: "It Girl" (2022)
- Billen Ted: "Feel The Burn" (2023)
- Peking Duk: "Do Your Best" (2026)

In July 2023, Kah-Lo announced the upcoming release of her debut album "Pain/Pleasure" on September 8, 2023. It was preceded by the release of "GD Woman", "Karma", and "fund$".

== Awards and nominations ==
=== Grammy Awards ===
Year	Category	Nominated artist/work	Result
2017	Best Dance Recording	"Rinse & Repeat" (featuring Riton)	Nominated
