= Oneself (rapper) =

- Origin: United States
- Genres: Hip hop
- Years active: 1995–present
- Formerly of: Rusty Ps

Aron Smith, known by his stage name Oneself or MC Oneself, is an American hip hop artist based in Milwaukee, Wisconsin. A former member of the Rusty Ps, he began his career in 1995.

Oneself was influenced by jazz, reggae, funk and punk rock.

== Tours and performances ==
As a member of Rusty Ps, he toured nationally with groups such as The Pharcyde. As an opening act, with the Rusty Ps, he also performed with groups such as Run DMC, Eminem, Blackalicious, Latyrx, DJ Shadow, The Roots, Slick Rick, Jurassic 5, Hieroglyphics, The Black Eyed Peas, Nappy Roots and Atmosphere. As a solo artist he has opened for Sage Francis, KRS-One and Souls of Mischief.

== Awards ==
- Wisconsin Area Music Industry - Best Hip-Hop/Rap artist
- Shepherd Express "Best of Milwaukee" - Voted "best of" by the readers

== Discography ==
=== Rusty Pelicans/Rusty Ps ===
- "Prototype RPCP" 12" - The first released recording by the Rusty Pelicans. Recorded at Walls Have Ears, Milwaukee. Vocal recording, mix and mastering done at Hollywood Sound in Hollywood, California. (1999)
  RPCP stands for "Rusty Pelican, Civilized Person"
- The Best Part - The first full-length CD recorded by the Rusty Pelicans. Recorded at Bionic Studios, Milwaukee. (1999)
- "Tread Water" 12" - The second single recorded and released by the Rusty Pelicans in support of their album, Out of Many. This single was released internationally. (2000)
- Out of Many - The second full-length CD release recorded by the Rusty Ps. Recorded at Bionic Studios, Milwaukee. This album included collaborations with The Pharcyde and Atmosphere and was released internationally. (2001)
- One - the third full-length CD release recorded by the Rusty Ps. Recorded at Bionic Studios, Milwaukee. (2002)

=== Solo releases ===
- "Oneway" - First solo release on 12" vinyl with the songs "Oneway", "Love Like This" and "Cooler by the Lake".
