= Righteous but Ruthless =

Studio album by King Sun
- Released: 1990
- Genre: Rap, gangsta rap, political rap
- Length: 46:26
- Label: Profile
- Producer: Tony D, King Shameek, Troy Wonder

King Sun chronology
King Sun XL (1989)	Righteous but Ruthless (1990)	Strictly Ghetto (1994)

Righteous but Ruthless is the second album by the American rapper King Sun, released in 1990. The first two singles were "Be Black" and "Undercover Lover". Many of the tracks met resistance from Black and urban radio stations due to their religious and political content. Righteous but Ruthless peaked at No. 54 on Billboard's Top R&B Albums chart. King Sun supported the album with live dates that included Terminator X and Redhead Kingpin. Righteous but Ruthless was King Sun's final album with Profile Records, as he felt that the label did not promote it.

== Production ==
The album was produced by Tony D, King Shameek, and Troy Wonder. "Soft Shoe Booty" is a dis track aimed at pop rappers and musicians who treat righteous rap as a fad. "Undercover Lover" is a love song; "Be Black" urges listeners to embrace a Black identity, yet acknowledges King Sun's preference for "redbones", or light-skinned Black women. "Cold New Yorkin'" samples "In the Ghetto", by Eric B. & Rakim. The title of "Universal Flag" refers to the Five-Percent emblem and the song espouses Five-Percent Nation and Nation of Islam philosophies; Profile would not allow King Sun to include the track on his debut album. "The Gods Are Taking Heads" features a guest appearance by Poor Righteous Teachers.

== Critical reception ==
Professional ratings
Review scores
Source	Rating
AllMusic	4.5/5 stars
MusicHound R&B: The Essential Album Guide	4/5 stars
RapReviews	9.5/10
The Source	3.5/5 stars
The Virgin Encyclopedia of Dance Music	2/5 stars

The New York Times noted that Righteous but Ruthless "marks a late conversion to righteousness; it has as many gangster (ruthless) raps as righteous ones." The Washington Post said, "With his deep, gruff voice and fluid, dispassionate delivery, [King Sun] seems better suited to gritty urban narratives–'gangsta' raps–than to science-dropping." The Detroit Free Press called the album "a highly energetic and fiery package". The Lake Geneva Regional News labeled King Sun "one of a kind". Factsheet Five said that King Sun "is a slick guy, politically astute and musically aware as well." Rob Tewlow of The Source applauded the album for its lush production and lyrical depth. Ending the review, he wrote: "King Sun has definitely scored with a record that will please the hardcore crowd." Comparing him to Rakim, Paul Rogers of Hip-Hop Connection commended King Sun, saying that his "deep-throated raps [...] are perfectly matched by the slamming jazzy beats". The journalist criticized some of the tracks for being "predicably boring gangsta-type rap".

MusicHound R&B: The Essential Album Guide stated that Righteous but Ruthless is "loaded with gems". In 2007, RapReviews deemed the album "a hip-hop classic."

== Track listing ==
No.	Title	Producer(s)	Length
1.	"Be Black"	King Shameek	5:40
2.	"The Gods Are Taking Heads" (featuring Poor Righteous Teachers)	Tony D; Troy Wonder	4:15
3.	"Big Shots"	King Shameek	5:20
4.	"Stunts"	Tony D; Troy Wonder	3:58
5.	"Undercover Lover"	King Shameek	4:21
6.	"King Sun with the Sword"	Tony D	4:47
7.	"Pure Energy"	King Shameek	4:18
8.	"Soft Shoe Booty"	Tony D	4:12
9.	"Universal Flag"	King Shameek	5:12
10.	"Cold New Yorkin'"	King Shameek	4:23
Total length:			46:26
