= Cold Water Music =

Studio album by Aim
- Released: 11 October 1999
- Studios: Grand Central Studios (Manchester, England)
- Genres: Hip hop; electronica; trip hop
- Length: 49:57
- Label: Grand Central
- Producer: Aim

Aim chronology
Cold Water Music (1999)	Hinterland (2002)

Professional ratings
Review scores
Source	Rating
AllMusic	4/5 stars
Muzik	5/5 stars
Record Collector	3/5 stars

Cold Water Music is the debut studio album by British musician Aim, released on 11 October 1999 by Grand Central Records. The album was re-issued in 2007 by ATIC Records.

== Song information ==
The first track, "Intro", contains a sample from the documentary Hoop Dreams (1994) of William Gates, one of the basketball players followed in the film, speaking from his recovery room after surgery. The commentary forms the lyrics to the track. The track "Cold Water Music" contains a sample of "Maureen in the Desert", written by Carter Burwell and taken from the soundtrack to the film Psycho III (1986). The extended dialogue in the track "Demonique" was sampled from the John Carpenter horror films, Halloween (1978) and Halloween II (1981). It features (primarily) the exchanges between the characters of Dr. Sam Loomis (Donald Pleasence) and Sheriff Leigh Brackett (Charles Cyphers). The track "Ain't Got Time to Waste" is featured on the soundtrack of the European version of the video game Tony Hawk's Pro Skater. The track “Force” includes a sample of Spirit's “Mr. Skin.”

== Track listing ==
No.	Title	Length
1.	"Intro"	0:55
2.	"Cold Water Music"	5:44
3.	"The Force" (featuring Q'n'C)	4:05
4.	"Sail" (featuring Kate Rogers)	5:14
5.	"Downstate"	4:14
6.	"Ain't Got Time to Waste" (featuring YZ)	4:08
7.	"Fat City (Interlude)"	0:38
8.	"True to Hip Hop" (featuring A.G.)	4:28
9.	"Demonique"	5:18
10.	"A Tree, a Rock and a Cloud"	4:17
11.	"Journey to the End of the Night"	5:27
12.	"From Here to Fame" (featuring YZ)	5:29
Total length:		49:57

== Personnel ==
Credits for Cold Water Music adapted from album liner notes.

- Aim – arrangement, production, scratching, sleeve design

Additional musicians

- A.G. – performance
- Q'n'C – performance
- Kate Rogers – performance
- Josef Ward – horns
- YZ – performance

Production

- Mike Ball – engineering (assistant)
- Steve Christian – engineering, mixing
- Nilesh Patel – mastering

Design

- Nick Fry – artwork, design
- Benge Newman – liner notes
- Tony Stone – photography
- Phil Turner – photography

== Charts ==
Chart (1999)	Peak position
UK Albums (Official Charts)	193
UK Independent Albums (Official Charts)	28
