= Diamond (Constant Deviants album) =

- Commercial free album art from Constant Deviants third album Diamond. Commercially released on SIX2SIX Records © 2011

Studio album by Constant Deviants
- Released: November 19, 2012
- Recorded: 2012; SIX2SIX Studios (New York City)
- Genre: Hip hop
- Label: SIX2SIX Records
- Producer: Constant Deviants

Constant Deviants chronology
Amongst Friends (2000)	Diamond (2012)	Avant Garde (2015)

Singles from Diamond
- 1. "Gangster Boogie" Released: November 18, 2012; 2. "Its OK!" Released: April 26, 2013

Diamond is the third studio album by American hip hop duo Constant Deviants. The album was released on November 19, 2012 by their label SIX2SIX Records. Diamond's production and mixing was entirely handled by the duo. It was supported by the single "Gangster Boogie". The standard version of the album contains fifteen tracks, with the digital version containing three hidden songs on the album.

== Background and promotion ==
On November 18, 2012, Constant Deviants released "Gangster Boogie", the first single from their third studio album. The video was premiered by Pot Holes In My Blog. Along with its release, it was revealed the album would be titled Diamond and be released on November 19, 2012. It was also reported that the album would be produced and mixed by the duo, along with being released by their own label SIX2SIX Records, like their previous releases.

The duo stated that the album explores the growth after ten years of being apart musically.

== Critical reception ==
Upon its release, Diamond was met with generally positive reviews from music critics. PopCulturez said,

"The Brooklyn-meets-Baltimore duo always stayed something of an underground treat for hip-hop fans, never quite achieving the success that their talent deserved. Having spent around ten years apart, rapper, M.I,. and producer, DJ Cutt came back together with last year’s ‘Platinum: The Mixtape’ building a buzz once more among hip-hop aficionados."

"Certainly, M.I.’s baritone raps hold their own across the strong tracks, as he delivers with a direct flow that rides the beat, offering clarity to his rhymes. Clear to hear from the first listen, M.I.s word-play is crisp and concise, as he at times, recalls the rhyme patter of 50 Cent. It would, perhaps, be more fitting to say that M.I. stands on his own and brings a rawness that fans of the likes of Real Live will easily latch onto. Never getting lost in overly-complex rhyme patterns and vocabulary, the rhymes are readily understood, as M.I. makes sure his message is followed throughout."

== Track listing ==
- All songs were produced by Constant Deviants.

No.	Title	Length
1.	"Intro"	0:57
2.	"Raw (DIAMOND)"	3:54
3.	"Gangster Boogie"	4:10
4.	"One, Two"	3:30
5.	"Top 10"	3:09
6.	"Chill"	2:54
7.	"It's OK"	3:30
8.	"Man Alone"	3:47
9.	"Here I Come"	3:55
10.	"It's All Love"	3:17
11.	"Victory"	3:46
12.	"B My Pleasure"	3:35
13.	"Krush Groove"	3:46
14.	"Point Blank"	3:54
15.	"Im Sayin'"	4:46
