= Sluggy Ranks =

Jamaican musician

- Born: Andrew Phillip Gregory; 14 December 1966; Kingston, Jamaica
- Died: 29 July 2012 (aged 45) Kingston, Jamaica
- Genres: Dancehall
- Years active: Mid 1980s–2012
- Label: Profile

Andrew Phillip Gregory (14 December 1966 – 29 July 2012), better known as Sluggy Ranks, was a Jamaican dancehall singer who was a major part of the New York dancehall scene.

== Biography ==
Born in the Rae Town district of East Kingston, Ranks relocated to Brooklyn in 1981. In 1984 he began recording for the Brooklyn-based Jah Life label and worked with local sound systems such as Mini Mart Hi Power, King Custom Sound and African Love. He became known for his 'cultural' lyrics, which contrasted with the prevailing 'slack' lyrics of dancehall. In 1988 he worked with producer Whitfield "Witty" Henry on the single "95% Black, 5% White", a commentary on the state of the US prison system. He went on to record several albums in the 1980s and 1990s, including the Prince Jammy-produced Ghetto Youth Bust in 1994, released on Profile Records. His single "Sodom & Gomorrah", recorded on the "Tempo" rhythm, dealt with the confrontation between Super Cat and Nitty Gritty at Count Shelly's record shop that led to Nitty Gritty's death. In 1997 he contributed to the Easy Star album Easy Star Volume I, and in 2003 to the Easy Star All Stars' Dub Side of the Moon.

At the age of 45, he died on 29 July 2012, as a result of injuries he sustained in a car accident in Kingston's Stony Hill neighborhood.

== Discography ==
=== Albums ===
- Settle Sluggy (1988), Park Heights
- Ghetto Youth Buss (1989), Grade One
- Ghetto Youth Bust (1994), Profile
- Just Call Sluggy (1987), Witty
- My Time (1999), Barry U

=== Singles ===
- "True Sound" (198?), Jah Life
- "Draw Fi Mi Bible" (198?), Jah Life
- "Rucumbine" (1987), Music Master - Sluggy & Twitch
- "95% Black, 5% White" (1988), Music Master
- "Don't Be Prejudiced" (1989), Park Heights
- "Ketch Dem Fraid" (1990), Mr. Doo
- "My Time" (1990), Shelly's
- "Iron Curtain" (1990), Libra - with Rev. Badoo
- "Tell Me Now" (1991), Shelly's
- "No Money Na Run" (1991), Rockers Forever
- "Ghetto Youth Bust" (1994), Profile
- "Jah Is Guiding I" (1994), John John
- "Sodom & Gomorrah" (199?), Part II/Gold Shop
- "Titus, Share the Cake" (1995), Secret Rival - with Chuck Fender, Ninja Kid, Tuffest, Mikey Merican, and Terrible Cat
- "Ghetto Youth" (1995), WEA - Booyaka Crew & Sluggy Ranks
- "Weedman" (1995), Secret Rival - Sluggy Ranks & Tuffest
- "The Coming of the Lord" (1997), Barry U
- "Nothing in the World" (2003), Wild Apache
- "Zion Gate" (2006), Total Satisfaction
- "Don´t Want To Be A Shotta" (20??), Digital English
- "Don't Want to be a Shotta part 2" (2010), Digital English
- "Rough Wine" (2010), Witty
- "Done with the Badness" (2011), Digital English
- "Ghetto Youth" (2011), King Kustom
- "Another One Bites The Dust" (2011), 14 Karat
- "Too Chatty Chatty" (2011), 14 Karat
- "Strictly Reggae Music" (2011), Roots Injection
