= Poor Righteous Teachers =

American hip hop group

Background information
- Origin: Trenton, New Jersey, U.S.
- Genres: Hip hop; conscious hip hop; jazz rap
- Years active: 1989–1996; 2001
- Label: Profile
- Past members: Wise Intelligent; Culture Freedom; Father Shaheed (deceased)

Poor Righteous Teachers was a hip hop group from Trenton, New Jersey, founded in 1989. Often referred to as PRT by its fans, Poor Righteous Teachers was known as a socially and politically conscious hip hop group, with musical content inspired by the teachings of the Nation of Gods and Earths. Wise Intelligent, as the lead MC, was the most visible and well known member of the group. Culture Freedom provided vocals and production, and Father Shaheed served as a DJ and producer. About.com ranked the group's lead MC, Wise Intelligent, number five on its list of the 10 Most Underrated Rappers, calling him "one of the most creative MCs of our time."

== Career ==
PRT debuted in 1989 with the release of the single "Time to Say Peace" b/w "Butt Naked Booty Bless." The trio released its first album, Holy Intellect, in 1990, amid a number of similarly pro-Black albums such as Public Enemy's Fear of a Black Planet, X-Clan's To the East, Blackwards, and Brand Nubian's One for All. While not as commercially successful as these albums, Holy Intellect received critical acclaim and spawned the group's only major radio hit, "Rock Dis Funky Joint." PRT also appeared on King Sun's 1990 album, Righteous but Ruthless. PRT returned in 1991 with its second album, Pure Poverty. The album was not as commercially successful as its debut, and was not as acclaimed. The lead single "Shakiyla (JRH)", became a minor rap hit that year. The group's third, and possibly most successful release to date, Black Business, was released in 1993. Sales were once again limited, but the album was a critical success. The album's lead single, "Nobody Move", received little radio airplay. After a three-year hiatus, PRT returned as a group in 1996 with its fourth album, The New World Order. Released in a new Hip Hop era, the album received little attention, failing to reach the Billboard 200 album chart. The album's lead single, "Word Iz Life", was barely able to reach the Hot Rap Singles chart, peaking at the chart's lowest position, No. 50. Despite the lack of significant attention, the album, like its past releases, received significant acclaim.

In 2001, Poor Righteous Teachers dropped the rare underground release Declaration of Independence. In 2006, Cha-Ching Records released Rare & Unreleased, a compilation of rare Poor Righteous Teachers songs and remixes.

PRT had a short feud with rapper YZ over reels of tapes that YZ would not give back to their owner, PRT.

Father Shaheed died in a motorcycle accident on May 26, 2014.

== Discography ==
=== Albums ===
Holy Intellect
- Released: May 29, 1990
- Billboard 200 chart position: No. 142
- R&B/Hip-Hop chart position: No. 17
- Singles: "Time to Say Peace"/"Butt Naked Booty Bless", "Rock Dis Funky Joint",
  "Holy Intellect"/"Self-Styled Wisdom"
Pure Poverty
- Released: September 3, 1991
- Billboard 200 chart position: No. 155
- R&B/Hip-Hop chart position: No. 23
- Singles: "Shakiyla (JRH)"/"Strictly Mash'ion", "Easy Star"
Black Business
- Released: September 14, 1993
- Billboard 200 chart position: No. 167
- R&B/Hip-Hop chart position: No. 29
- Singles: "Nobody Move"/"Da Rill Shit"
The New World Order
- Released: October 15, 1996
- Billboard 200 chart position: -
- R&B/Hip-Hop chart position: No. 57
- Singles: "Word Iz Life"/"Dreadful Day", "Conscious Style"

=== Singles ===
- "Time to Say Peace" (1989)
- "Holy Intellect" b/w "Self-Styled Wisdom" (1990)
- "Rock Dis Funky Joint" (1990)
- "Shakiyla (JRH)" b/w "Strictly Mash'ion" (1991)
- "Easy Star" (1992)
- "Nobody Move" b/w "Da Rill Shit" (1993)
- "Conscious Style" (1996)
- "Word Iz Life" b/w "Dreadful Day" (1996)
- "I Swear Ta God" (2001)
