= Constant Deviants =

American hip hop group

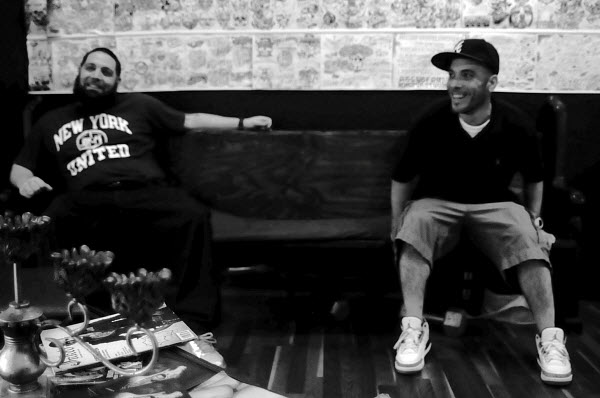
- Constant Deviants NYC in 2012

Background information
- Origin: Brooklyn, New York City, U.S.
- Genres: Hip hop
- Years active: 1995-present
- Label: SIX2SIX Records
- Members: DJ Cutt; M.I. (Mr.Impossible)
- Website: www.constantdeviants.com

Constant Deviants is an American hip hop group from Brooklyn, New York. They garnered respectability in the crowded NYC underground scene , although they have had little to no mainstream success in the US, with the exception of the song "Competition Catch Speed Knots", a 1996 Vestry Records release. They reached the Top 40 of the CMJ New Music Report with two singles, "Can't Stop" and "8th Wonder." in 1999 and 2000 on Brooklyn Pipeline/Buds Distribution.

Their members include DJ Cutt DJ/Producer, M.I. Rapper/Producer. The group gained the attention of manager Mark Pitts after their demo was shopped around to various record labels in the late 1990s.

== History ==
=== Early years and musical beginnings (1995-2005) ===
The duo began making music together in 1995 as teenagers. In a 2012 interview with the Village Voice M.I. stated:

“We were shopping our demo, five songs. We somehow tapped into these dudes that ran some sort of a management company and they sent it to Arista. This was right when Mark Pitts got to Arista, when L.A. Reid took over. This was probably on the cusp of 2000. The demo ended up on Mark's desk the day he got there. He heard it, liked it, contacted the guy we were dealing with and told them he liked a song called "Clap" on there.”

As a result, Constant Deviants admittedly did not see eye to eye with the direction from their newly formed relationship. DJ Cutt recalled:

"I ended up playing all the instruments on the record live and I had no idea how to play any records! I tried to program it but it sounded cheesy. I ended up buying an electric guitar. It wasn't bad, it just wasn't us."

For this reason the group would eventually abandon the idea of rock star rappers and return to their original roots.

M.I. added:

"We could be in the psycho-ward now, you know? To this day my relationship with Mark is beautiful. He's told me he'll always cosign anything for us."

=== Constant Deviants (2006-present) ===
After their major label courtship with Arista fell apart. Both M.I. and DJ Cutt decided to create SIX2SIX Records in 2006 a imprint dedicated to vinyl record only reissues for independent music artists. In 2010 the two began recording their first album in 10 years entitled 'Diamond'. Diamond received widespread critical acclaim for its production, rawness, and organic appeal. PopCulturez gave the album and group high praise, stating:

"Of course, rhymes are only part of the puzzle, and DJ Cutt’s production oozes a genuine hip-hop appeal to really lift this release. With deep breaks, rumbling bass, fine instrumentation and classic samples, this album takes the sonic's back to a rich, organic feel, rather than following the disco-lite fashions of the cross-over set. Like all the best hip-hop crews, the strength of The Constant Deviants is the synergy between M.I.’s direct rhyming and DJ Cutt’s beautifully laid production. The whole album shows a real depth of respect for hip-hop as a musical art form, with tracks like ‘Chill,’ ‘Gangster Boogie,’ and ‘Krush Groove’ checking old-school classics either in the breaks, samples or rhymes. Elsewhere, ‘Mean No Harm,’ brings a laid-back party vibe over a strong organ line and soulful touches. However, to pick out stand-out tracks would be to name every tune on this release as the Constant Deviants have shown their quality with an album that delivers from start to finish."

On May 12, 2015, the duo released their fourth studio album Avant Garde.

== Discography ==
=== Albums ===
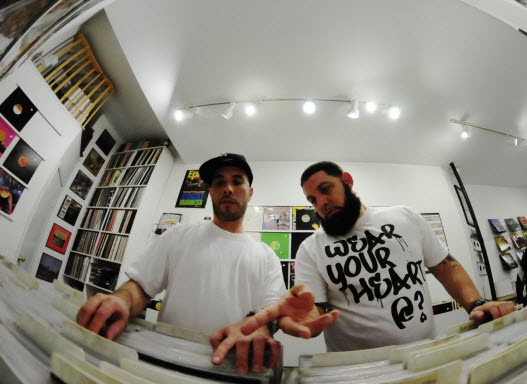
Constant Deviants dig through bins at Big City Records NYC 2012

Year	Album	Peak chart positions				
Year	Album	US	US R&B	US Rap	SWI	UK
2010	Concrete Utopia: Released: Oct 16, 2010; Label: SIX2SIX Records; Format: CD, CS, LP	—	—	—	—	—
2011	Amongst Friends: Released: Feb 23, 2011; Label: SIX2SIX Records; Format: CD, CS, LP	—	—	—	—	—
2012	Diamond: Released: November 19, 2012; Label: SIX2SIX Records; Format: CD, Digital Download	—	—	—	—	—
2015	Avant Garde: Released: May 12, 2015; Label: SIX2SIX Records; Format: CD, LP, Digital Download	—	—	—	—	—
2016	Omertà: Released: Jun 28, 2016; Label: SIX2SIX Records; Format: CD, LP, Digital Download	—	—	—	—	—
"—" denotes releases that did not chart.

=== Singles ===
- Competition Catch Speed Knots (1996)
- Can't Stop / Fed Up (1998)
- 8th Wonder / Hustler's Prayer (1998)
- Problem Child / Feel That (2010)
- 1995 Demo EP (2011)
- Fulton Street (2012)
- It's OK! (2013)
