= Chiclete com banana (song) =

1959 song written by Gordurinha and Almira Castilho

Song by Jackson do Pandeiro
- Recorded: 1959
- Genre: Samba
- Songwriters: Gordurinha; Almira Castilho

"Chiclete com banana" is a song written by Gordurinha and Almira Castilho and recorded in 1959 by Jackson do Pandeiro, who popularized the song. The title means "chewing gum and banana," which refers to American and Brazilian music.

Since 1959, the song has been covered by Gilberto Gil, Tania Maria, and others. It is thought to be among the first songs composed in the style of samba rock.

The lyrics, states the singer's fantasy of seeing American and Brazilian music joined, bebop in samba, Uncle Sam playing the tamborim, a small folk drum. Uncle Sam has to learn that samba isn't rhumba (a Cuban dance). The singer will, in his or her samba, join two iconic places: Miami with Copacabana, and two iconic products, Chiclets with bananas. Uncle Sam, playing a frigideira (a metal percussion instrument based on a frying pan), should join a Brazilian batucada, a percussion group.

The song has, as is not uncommon in samba, a nostalgic air. It was in the first half of the twentieth century when Chiclets were a well-known American product in Brazil. It is frequent in samba lyrics that the singer discusses what musical or cultural style went into his samba.
