= Flight 602 (album) =

Studio album by Aim
- Released: September 25, 2006
- Studio: Speed Limit Studios (Barrow, UK)
- Genre: Electronic; hip-hop
- Length: 52:55
- Label: ATIC
- Producer: Aim

Aim chronology
Hinterland (2002)	Flight 602 (2006)	The Habit of a Lifetime and How to Kick It (2015)

Singles from Flight 602
- 1. "Northwest" Released: 2006; 2. "Puget Sound" Released: 2006; 3. "Birchwood EP" Released: 2007

Professional ratings
Review scores
Source	Rating
Drowned in Sound	7/10
Gigwise	7/10 stars
musicOMH	4/5 stars
The Observer	3/5 stars
The Skinny	3/5 stars

Flight 602 is the third studio album by British musician Aim. It was released on 25 September 2006 via ATIC Records, marking the first release for his own independent record label. Recording sessions took place at Speed Limit Studios in Barrow, UK. Produced entirely by Aim, it features contributions from fellow ATIC co-founder and label-mate Niko, Justin Helliwell, Rick Walker, Bernard Moss and Phil Turner. In the United Kingdom, the album debuted at number 16 on the Official Hip Hop and R&B Albums and number 7 on the Official Independent Albums charts.

== Songs ==
The album's title is named after the flight that Charles Bukowski took to his first poetry reading in Germany.

The tracks "Puget Sound" and "Birchwood" were the only charted singles, debuting on the UK Official Independent Singles Chart at No. 38 and 41, respectively.

The track "Pier 57" was named after a holding area for peace protesters during the 2004 Republican conference in New York. Aim said of the event:

In 2004 the Republican Party held their annual convention in Manhattan, NYC. For the weekend the city was under virtual martial law as the police and military fused and hundreds of peaceful protesters were literally herded up and held in an old abandoned warehouse full of oil and asbestos, some for over 48 hours with absolutely no charge. The warehouse was on New York's Pier 57.

The closing track, "It's Later Than You Think", was originally a song by Aim's band project, Paperboy.

== Track listing ==
No.	Title	Writer(s)	Length
1.	"Intro #3"	Andy Turner; Herbie Hancock	1:24
2.	"Walking Home Through the Park"	Turner	5:47
3.	"Northwest"	Turner; Nicole Vergel De Dios	4:45
4.	"Puget Sound"	Turner	4:05
5.	"Pier 57"	Turner	3:59
6.	"Smile"	Turner; Vergel De Dios	5:12
7.	"Landlord"	Turner; Vergel De Dios	4:02
8.	"Aberdeen"	Turner; Vergel De Dios; Jeffrey Comanor	4:26
9.	"Birchwood"	Turner	4:43
10.	"Flight 602"	Turner	5:16
11.	"Interview"	Turner; Carlos Mejía; Black Sugar	5:52
12.	"It's Later Than You Think"	Turner; Justin Helliwell; Rick Walker	3:24
Total length:			52:55

Sample credits

- Track 1 contains a sample from "Dolphin Dance" written by Herbie Hancock and performed by Jorge Dalto.
- Track 8 contains a sample from "Love Moan" written by Jeffrey Comanor and performed by Cheryl Ernst.
- Track 11 contains a sample from "When You're Walking" written by Carlos Mejía and Black Sugar and performed by Black Sugar.

== Personnel ==
- Andrew "Aim" Turner – vocals (tracks: 4, 12), guitars (tracks: 2, 4, 6, 8, 12), keyboards (tracks: 2, 3, 5, 9), synthesizer (tracks: 4, 7, 8), kalimba (track 12), producer, arrangement, engineering, mixing
- Nicole "Niko" Vergel De Dios – vocals (tracks: 1, 3, 4, 6–8), keyboards (tracks: 3, 6)
- Justin Helliwell – vocals (track 12)
- Rick Walker – guitar (tracks: 4, 12)
- Bernard Moss – flute (tracks: 5, 9)
- Phil Turner – additional bass (track 6)
- Nilesh Patel – mastering

== Charts ==
Chart (2006)	Peak position
UK R&B Albums (OCC)	16
UK Independent Albums (OCC)	7
