= Rae & Christian =

English musical duo

- Origin: Manchester, England
- Genres: Electronic, trip hop
- Years active: 1995–present
- Labels: Grand Central; K7; Night Time Stories
- Members: Mark Rae; Steve Christian

Rae & Christian are an English production duo, consisting of Mark Rae and Steve Christian. They are also founders of the Grand Central Records label.

== History ==
In 1995, Mark Rae fulfilled a long-term dream by founding Grand Central Records in Manchester. He first met sound engineer and producer Steve Christian when they both utilised the same rehearsal space in Ducie House in the Northern Quarter of Manchester. The first meeting took place when Christian, who is the production strength of the duo, walked past Rae's studio and informed him that his music was out of key. The pair embarked on a partnership that has seen them achieve critical and public acclaim for their work

In an interview with Pride of Manchester, Rae said:

We committed ourselves to promoting good music; hip-hop, soul, jazz, breakbeat, jungle, Jamaican reggae, house ... we work with everything. I think a lot of people are under the impression we're just a hip-hop label, but we're actually just an "anything" label which is based in the pioneering sounds of everything from bleep house from Sheffield to London jungle."

Naturally, this new act was the first to release records on the Grand Central Records label. Their first release was an EP, Pure Arithmetic, released in June 1995 under the band name First Priority. A year after their emergence, Rae and Christian enlisted the vocal skills of Veba to add a more diverse flavour to their sound. Contributions to the Grand Central Records compilations Frying The Fat and Central Heating attracted attention from the dance music press.

In 1998, they released their debut album as Rae & Christian, Northern Sulphuric Soul. The Jungle Brothers and Jeru The Damaja both contributed to the album's songs, giving them an edge over other sampling groups of the late 1990s. They undertook a heavy touring schedule, travelling with their own percussionist, double bass player, female vocalist, scratch DJ, saxophone, flute and rhodes players, to complement the skills of Rae behind the deck and Christian on guitar.

At the same time as nurturing other acts on the Grand Central Records label, their production and remixes were utilised by (Lamb, The Pharcyde, Wai Wan) and mainstream stars such as Natalie Imbruglia, Simply Red and The Manic Street Preachers. Their second album, Sleepwalking marked a change in approach, a movement towards more live instrumentation and more varied songwriting partnerships with veteran musicians such as Bobby Womack, Tania Maria and The Congos.

Mark and Steve released their third album in October 2013 and took the new album on the road with varied line ups to match availability with the vocal guests involved. The album was recorded over the previous four years in Yorkshire in Steve Christian's studio with additional recording and writing undertaken in Mark Rae's London studio. The album features Ed Harcourt, Kate Rogers, DJ Jazzy Jeff, Masta Ace, Mystro, Jake Emlyn, Gita Langley, Diagrams, Mark Foster, Agent 86, Mel Uye Parker and Pete Simpson, as guest appearances.

== Discography ==
=== Studio albums ===
List of studio albums, with selected chart positions
Title	Year	Peak chart positions		
Title	Year	UK	AUS	FRA
Northern Sulphuric Soul	1998	150	64	—
Sleepwalking	2001	67	—	114
Mercury Rising	2013	—	—	—

=== DJ mix albums ===
- Blazing the Crop (1999)
- Another Late Night: Rae & Christian (2001)

=== Remix albums ===
- Nocturnal Activity (2002)
- Raiding the Vaults (2009)

=== Charted singles ===
List of charted singles, with selected chart positions
Title	Year	Peak chart positions	Album
Title	Year	UK	Album
"Spellbound" (featuring Veba)	1998	77	Northern Sulphuric Soul
"All I Ask" (featuring Veba)	1999	67	Northern Sulphuric Soul
"Get a Life" (featuring Bobby Womack)	2001	76	Sleepwalking
