= YZ (rapper) =

American rapper

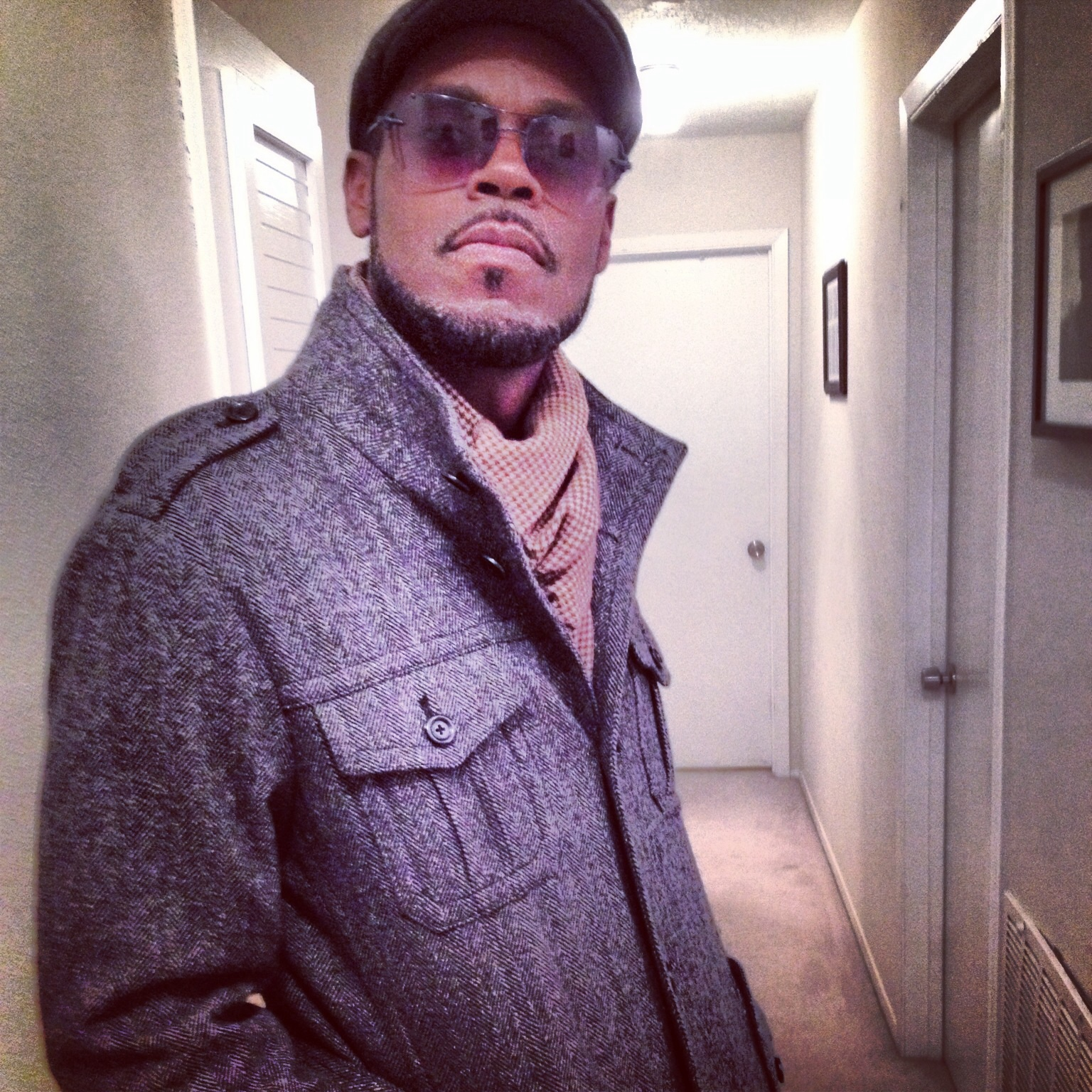
YZ

Anthony Hill, known by his stage name YZ, and alias Ali Sa'id Nur al-Din, is an American rapper from Trenton, New Jersey.

== Career ==
At age 17, YZ and DJ Tony D opened a company called Two Tone Productions in Trenton, New Jersey. YZ and group members G-Rock and DJ Tink released the single "I Am Who I Am/I'm Bad" (1989) on Trenton independent label Rockin' Hard Records. After acquiring half of the company Diversity Records, YZ released the maxi single, "In Control of Things"/"Thinking of a Master Plan", in 1989.

Diversity Records later signed the hip hop group Poor Righteous Teachers (PRT), but because of conflicts with Tony D (the man responsible for producing PRT), Diversity and PRT severed ties before the release of their first single.

YZ signed a deal with Tuff City Records in 1990, then released his first LP, Sons of The Father (1990), and another project, YZ EP (1991.) Subsequently, YZ signed with Livin' Large/Tommy Boy/Warner Bros, and released the single "Return of the Holy One" (1992.) In 1993, YZ released his second full-length LP, The Ghetto's Been Good to Me. After 1994, YZ released numerous projects independently, including the LPs The Legend of Floyd Jones (2002) and Muad'ib (2009.) In 1999, YZ performed vocals on two tracks on Aim's album Cold Water Music.

== Discography ==
- 1990: Sons of the Father (Tuff City Records)
- 1993: The Ghetto's Been Good to Me (Livin' Large/Tommy Boy/Warner Bros. Records)
- 1999: "Ain't Got Time to Waste" (featuring YZ) Cold_Water_Music
- 2002: YZ Presents the Legend of Floyd Jones (Reservoir Records)
- 2009: Muad'Dib (Blackworld Entertainment)
- 2025: Moorganic
