= Siro the Epicurean =

Siro (also Syro, Siron, or Syron; fl. c. 50 BC) was an Epicurean philosopher who lived in Naples.

He was a teacher of Virgil, and taught at his school in Naples. There are two poems attributed to Virgil in the Appendix Vergiliana, which mention Siro, and where the author speaks of seeking peace in the company of Siro:

I am setting sail for the havens of the blest to seek the wise sayings of great Siro, and will redeem my life from all care.

Cicero also mentions Siro several times and speaks of Siro along with Philodemus as being "excellent citizens and most learned men." The 5th-century commentator Servius claimed that Siro was commemorated in Virgil's sixth Eclogue as the character Silenus.
