= Riton (musician) =

British DJ and producer (born 1978)

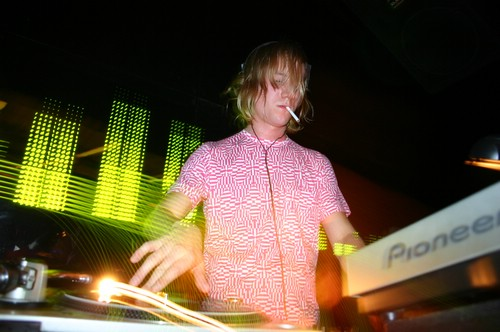
- Riton in 2006

Background information
- Also known as: Riton, Lil' Papi Riton, Eine Kleine Nacht Musik, KUU, Carte Blanche, Gucci Sound System
- Born: Henry Oliver Smithson; 13 September 1978 (age 47); Newcastle upon Tyne, England
- Genres: Electronic, house
- Occupations: DJ, music producer
- Years active: 2001–present
- Labels: Riton Time; Last Gang; Ed Banger; Ministry of Sound; Grand Central; Love & Other; Switch
- Spouse: Imogene Barron
- Website: ritontime.co.uk

Henry Oliver Smithson (born 13 September 1978), best known by his stage name Riton (/ˈriːtɒn/ REE-ton), is an English electronic music DJ and producer from Newcastle upon Tyne.

== Biography ==
Smithson was born in Newcastle upon Tyne. The name Riton is French slang for "Henry". He graduated from the University of Newcastle upon Tyne.

After finishing university, Smithson started the Switch Recordings label, upon which he released his first two 12" singles. He began DJing at Newcastle's "Shindig" nightclub. There, he was discovered by Mark Rae and signed to Grand Central Records independent record label. Like Rae, he then worked in Manchester's Fat City Records label/distribution/retail outlet.

His first release on Grand Central, the song "Communicated", featured on the compilation album Central Heating 2 (2000) and was followed by his mostly instrumental debut album, Beats du Jour (2001).

Riton's second album, Homies And Homos (2004) was a much more vocal affair, and featured amongst others, Lee Jones of Howdi and Luca Santucci. It includes a cover version of The Cure's song "Killing an Arab".

In 2005, Riton and Ben Rymer formed the Gucci Sound System. The pair have a monthly residency at the 333 Club in London and have their own nightclub named Druzzi's Baltimore Rave Club at Nightmoves on Shoreditch High Street in East London. Guests have included Headman, Erol Alkan, 2 Many DJs, The Rapture, Richard X, Mylo and FC Kahuna.

Since the demise of Grand Central Records in 2006, Riton has released 12" singles on several European labels, including Linxfarren in the UK.

In late 2006, it was announced in the Belgian magazine HUMO that David and Stephen Dewaele from Soulwax had formed a krautrock band with Riton called Die Verboten. An album was expected late 2007, but to date there has been no further information on the project. Instead, Riton released an album under the pseudonym Eine Kleine Nacht Musik on the label Modular Records in July 2008. In 2010, he launched a project called "Carte Blanche" with DJ Mehdi.

Riton was to release new music in November 2011 ('Dark Place' and 'A.C.P) and was also working on music for his album, collaborating with artists and producers such as Surkin and AlunaGeorge – due for release in summer 2012.

At the start of 2016, Riton hit chart success with the track "Rinse & Repeat"; the track featured vocals from Kah-Lo. The track was released via Riton's own Riton Time record label.

He then released a collaborative album, Foreign Ororo with Kah-Lo, in October 2018 producing fan-favourite hits including GRAMMY nominated 'Rinse & Repeat', 'Fake ID', 'Up & Down' and 'Ginger' – anthems that received a wealth of radio support from tastemakers around the world including the likes of Annie Mac at BBC Radio 1. He also co-produced on the Dua Lipa and Silk City single 'Electricity', winning a Grammy for "Best Dance Recording".

In 2021, the MK remix of Nightcrawlers' "Push the Feeling On" was sampled by Riton, to record a track called "Friday". Credited to Riton X Nightcrawlers featuring Mufasa and Hypeman, the record featured a couple of social media stars and was issued by Sony's Ministry of Sound Recordings. It entered the UK Singles Chart at number 60 on 22 January 2021 and eventually reached the top 5 on the Official Chart Company's chart of 5 to 11 March 2021. In November, his Gucci Soundsystem project with Ben Rymer teamed up with Jarvis Cocker to release the climate change-inspired "Let's Stick Around", which came with a video filmed in Glasgow around the time of the COP26 conference.

== Discography ==
=== Albums ===
List of albums
Title	Album details
Beats Du Jour	Released: June 2001; Label: Grand Central Records (GCCD111); Formats: digital download, CD, LP
Homies and Homos	Released: September 2004; Label: Grand Central Records (GCCD131); Formats: digital download, CD, LP
Eine Kleine Nacht Musik (as Eine Kleine Nacht Musik)	Released: 2008; Label: Modular Recordings (MODCD090); Formats: digital download, CD
Foreign Ororo (as Riton + Kah-Lo)	Released: 26 October 2018; Label: Riton Time (LGE-ED-1875A); Formats: digital download, streaming, LP

=== Extended plays ===
List of EPs
Title	EP details
One to Ten	Released: 12 October 1999; Label: Switch Record 01 (MR34412); Formats: LP
Lost My Mind	Released: 21 January 2013; Label: Ed Banger Records (ED069); Formats: LP, digital download
Bad Guy RiRi	Released: 26 May 2014; Label: Ed Banger Records (ED078); Formats: LP, digital download
My House, My Rules	Released: 29 September 2023; Label: Warner Music UK; Formats: digital download

=== Singles ===
==== As lead artist ====
List of singles
Title	Year	Peak chart positions										Certification	Album
Title	Year	UK	AUS	AUT	BEL (FL)	FRA	GER	ITA	IRE	POR	SWI	Certification	Album
"Control P." (as Lil' Papi Riton)	2000	—	—	—	—	—	—	—	—	—	—		Non-album single
"Take Control"	2001	—	—	—	—	—	—	—	—	—	—		Beats Du Jour
"Habib"	2001	—	—	—	—	—	—	—	—	—	—		Beats Du Jour
"Hungry Ghosts"	2001	—	—	—	—	—	—	—	—	—	—		Beats Du Jour
"Let Me Be Mind"	2002	—	—	—	—	—	—	—	—	—	—		Beats Du Jour
"Closer" / "Walk On Water" (vs Howdi & featuring The Uber Audio Bros)	2002	—	—	—	—	—	—	—	—	—	—		Non-album singles
"Cast of Thousands" / "I Found My Love"	2003	—	—	—	—	—	—	—	—	—	—		Non-album singles
"Killing an Arab"	2004	193	—	—	—	—	—	—	—	—	—		Homies and Homos
"Candy"	2005	—	—	—	—	—	—	—	—	—	—		Homies and Homos
"Squauqe Eyes" / "Angerman"	2006	—	—	—	—	—	—	—	—	—	—		Non-album singles
"Vejer" (vs Heidi)	2006	—	—	—	—	—	—	—	—	—	—		Non-album singles
"Monsteer" (with Lindström)	2006	—	—	—	—	—	—	—	—	—	—		Non-album singles
"Hammer of Thor"	2007	—	—	—	—	—	—	—	—	—	—		Non-album singles
"La Serenissima" / "Phantasie" (as Eine Kleine Nacht Musik)	2008	—	—	—	—	—	—	—	—	—	—		Eine Kleine Nacht Musik
"Who's There" (with Primary 1)	2009	—	—	—	—	—	—	—	—	—	—		Non-album singles
"Radiates" (with Primary 1)	2009	—	—	—	—	—	—	—	—	—	—		Non-album singles
"Ritontime" (aka "Dark Place" / "A.C.P.")	2011	—	—	—	—	—	—	—	—	—	—		Non-album singles
"Lost My Mind" (featuring Jay Norton & Scrufizzer)	2013	—	—	—	—	—	—	—	—	—	—		Lost My Mind
"Aloha Surfers!"	2014	—	—	—	—	—	—	—	—	—	—		Bad Guy RiRi
"Inside My Head" (featuring Meleka)	2014	—	—	—	—	—	—	—	—	—	—		Non-album singles
"I Am the Whisperer" (featuring Molly Beanland)	2014	—	—	—	—	—	—	—	—	—	—		Non-album singles
"Need Your Love" (featuring Jagga)	2015	—	—	—	—	—	—	—	—	—	—		Non-album singles
"Rinse & Repeat" (featuring Kah-Lo)	2016	13	—	—	42	—	—	—	—	52	—	BPI: Gold	Foreign Ororo
"Betta Riddim" (with Kah-Lo)	2016	—	—	—	—	—	—	—	—	—	—		Foreign Ororo
"Money" (featuring Kah-Lo, Mr Eazi and Davido)	2017	—	—	—	22	—	—	—	—	—	—		Foreign Ororo
"Deeper" (with MNEK featuring House Gospel Choir)	2017	—	—	—	—	—	—	—	—	—	—		Non-album single
"Fake ID" (with Kah-Lo)	2017	—	—	—	—	—	—	—	—	—	—	BPI: Silver	Foreign Ororo
"Ginger" (with Kah-Lo)	2018	—	—	—	—	—	—	—	—	—	—		Foreign Ororo
"Up & Down" (with Kah-Lo)	2018	—	—	—	—	—	—	—	—	—	—		Foreign Ororo
"Catching Feelings" (with Kah-Lo featuring Mr Eazi)	2018	—	—	—	—	—	—	—	—	—	—		Non-album singles
"Dangerous" (with Kid Enigma)	2018	—	—	—	—	—	—	—	—	—	—		Non-album singles
"Turn Me On" (with Oliver Heldens featuring Vula)	2019	12	38	58	12	84	18	—	—	—	38	BPI: Platinum; ARIA: Platinum; BEA: Gold; BVMI: Platinum; FIMI: Gold; IFPI AUT: Platinum; IFPI SWI: Gold; SNEP: Gold; ZPAV: Gold	Non-album singles
"Mr Todd Terry" (with Gucci Soundsytem)	2019	—	—	—	—	—	—	—	—	—	—		Non-album singles
"How Could I Ever" (with Kuu and Alex Metric)	2020	—	—	—	—	—	—	—	—	—	—		Non-album singles
"Too High (featuring Boy Matthews)	2020	—	—	—	—	—	—	—	—	—	—		Non-album singles
"Friday" (with Nightcrawlers featuring Mufasa & Hypeman)	2021	4	12	5	1	21	3	10	3	7	2	BPI: 2× Platinum; ARIA: 3× Platinum; BEA: Gold; BVMI: 3× Gold; FIMI: 3× Platinum; IFPI AUT: 2× Platinum; IFPI SWI: 2× Platinum; ZPAV POL: 2× Platinum	TBA
"Come with Me" (with Bad Boy Chiller Crew)	2021	—	—	—	—	—	—	—	—	—	—		TBA
"I Don't Want You" (with Raye)	2021	50	—	—	—	—	—	—	—	—	—	BPI: Silver	Non-album singles
"Let's Stick Around" (with Gucci Soundsystem featuring Jarvis Cocker)	2021	—	—	—	—	—	—	—	—	—	—		Non-album singles
"Sugar" (featuring Soaky Siren)	2023	—	—	—	—	—	—	—	—	—	—		Non-album singles
"Where You Want" (with David Guetta and Jozzy)	2023	—	—	—	—	—	—	—	—	—	—		Non-album singles
"Never Knew Love" (with Belters Only featuring Enisa)	2023	—	—	—	—	—	—	—	—	—	—		My House, My Rules
"Run Up" (featuring Blasian Baddie)	2023	—	—	—	—	—	—	—	—	—	—		My House, My Rules
"—" denotes a recording that did not chart or was not released.

==== As featured artist ====
List of singles
Title	Year	Album
"By My Side" (Clashcorner presents Riton featuring Watine)	2004	non-album single
"Don't Talk to Me" (N.F.I. featuring Riton & Faangs)	2019	non-album single

=== Production credits ===
Title	Year	Artist(s)	Album	Credits	Produced with
"Daffodils" (featuring Kevin Parker)	2015	Mark Ronson	Uptown Special	Additional producer	Mark Ronson, Jeff Bhasker, James Ford
"Fasta"	2017	Kah-Lo	Foreign Ororo	Producer	-
"Only Can Get Better" (featuring Daniel Merriweather)	2018	Silk City	TBA	Co-producer	Mark Ronson, Diplo, The Picard Brothers, Alex Metric, Lil Silva
"Feel About You" (featuring Mapei)	2018	Silk City	TBA	Producer	Mark Ronson, Diplo, Magnus Lidehäll, Alex Metric, Jr Blender
"Close to You"	2019	Alice Ivy		Remixer	-
"Freak Like Me"	2020	Adina Howard		Remixer	-
