= Fingathing =

- Origin: Manchester, England
- Genres: Turntablism; nu jazz; electronic; trip hop
- Years active: 2000–present
- Labels: Grand Central Records; Ninja Tune (US)
- Members: Sneaky; Peter Parker; Cavetroll Drury

Fingathing are an English electronic music group, comprising classically trained double bass player Simon 'Sneaky' Houghton, DJ/turntablist Dan 'Peter Parker' Baxter and Visual Artist Chris Cavetroll Drury.

== History ==
Peter Parker was a finalist at the UK DMC DJ Championship, where Mark Rae was on the judging panel. Parker later met Rae at the Fat City Records store in Manchester and was asked to audition for the Rae & Christian live backing band.

Parker performed along with Sneaky for Rae & Christian, before teaming up as a pair. The band were signed to Rae's Grand Central Records in the UK (sub-contracted to Ninja Tune in the US), and have released three studio albums plus a best of compilation.

The band's album and single sleeves contain distinctive cartoon drawings by Chris Cavetroll Drury. Cavetroll also creates the animated visuals for the band when playing live.

The band's 2004 album, Fingathing and the Big Red Nebula Band, received a rating of 7.8 from Pitchfork.

== Discography ==
=== Albums ===
- 2 Player EP (24 July 2000) Grand Central Records
- The Main Event (20 November 2000) Grand Central Records
- Superhero Music (24 June 2002) Grand Central Records
- And The Big Red Nebula Band (10 May 2004) Grand Central Records/Ninja Tune (US)
- Time Capsule: The First Five Years of Fingathing (19 September 2005)
- Apocalypso EP (25 October 2006)
- Return of the Thing EP (17 March 2014)
- G (17 January 2025)

=== Solo releases ===
- Peter Parker released a limited edition DJ mix CD called Life After Death Mix.
- Sneaky has also released two limited edition mix CDs entitled Biscuit Mix and Bloody Axe Mix.
- Sneaky – Feel Like A King EP (4 January 2008)
- Sneaky – "Feel Like A King...Pluck A String" album (June 2009) Big Chill Label
