= Tania Maria =

Brazilian musician (born 1948)

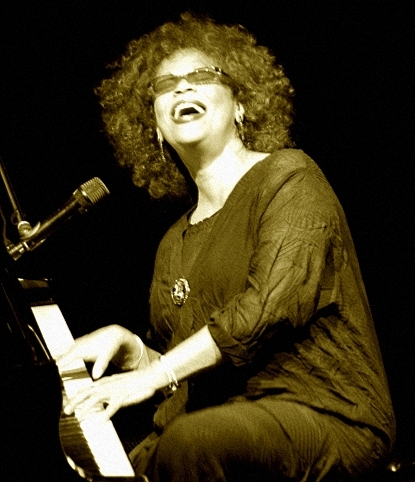
- Tania Maria in 2013

Background information
- Born: Tania Maria Correa Reis; May 9, 1948 (age 78)
- Origin: São Luís, Maranhão, Brazil
- Genres: Jazz, pop, MPB
- Occupations: Musician, composer, bandleader
- Instrument: Piano
- Years active: 1969–present
- Labels: Concord, Capitol, Blue Note, EMI, Universal
- Website: TaniaMaria.net

Tania Maria (born May 9, 1948) is a Brazilian artist, singer, composer, bandleader and piano player, singing mostly in Portuguese or English. Her Brazilian-style music is mostly vocal, sometimes pop, often jazzy, and includes samba, bossa, Afro-Latin, pop and jazz fusion.

== Biography ==
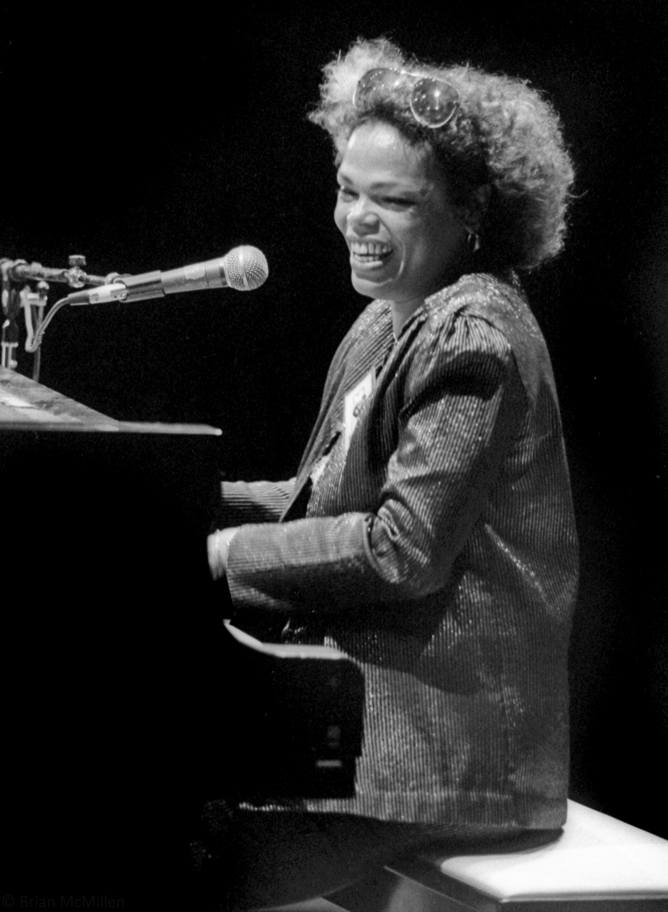
At Monterey Jazz Festival 1981

=== Early years ===
Born in São Luís, Maranhão, Brazil, Tania Maria began playing the piano at the age of seven, became a leader at the age of 13, when her band of professional musicians, organized by her father, won first prize in a local music contest and went on to play for dances, in clubs and on the radio. Her father, a metal worker and a gifted guitarist and singer, had encouraged her to study piano so that she could play in his weekend jam sessions, where she first absorbed the rhythms and melodies of samba, jazz, pop music and Brazilian chorinho. Since then, she has never worked in anyone else's group. However, her mother was strongly against her daughter's pursuing a musical career, and at the age of 17, as reported by The New York Times, Maria "capitulated to conflicting parental pressures by getting married, giving up the piano entirely and studying law for two and a half years. But the desire to play kept nagging at her, and after five years of marriage, she left her husband and family to try to make a living as a musician."

=== Recording career ===
Maria's first album, Apresentamos (We Present), was released in Brazil in 1966, followed by Olha Quem Chega (Look Who's Here!) in 1971, but it was a move in 1974 to Paris, France, where she took a residency at the Via Brazil restaurant, that exploded her onto the international scene. At a concert in Australia, her formidable musical precision and freewheeling spirit caught the attention of the American guitarist, Charlie Byrd, who recommended her to Carl Jefferson, founder of Concord Records. She relocated to New York at the start of the 1980s, signing with the label.

Tania's 1983 album Come With Me – her third album with Concord – started her international breakthrough, with the title song becoming a 1980s dance-floor classic that has since been covered frequently. A year later, in 1984, her Love Explosion album contained the track "Deep Cove View" which was promoted by Robbie Vincent on his Sunday night soul shows on BBC Radio 1. The 1985 album Made in New York increased her popularity further worldwide.

Maria has played virtually every important jazz festival in the world and has appeared on countless television and radio programmes. She has recorded more than 25 albums and in 1985 was nominated for a Grammy Award in the category "Best Jazz Vocal Performance, Female". She has performed at venues such as the Blue Note and festivals including the Monterey Jazz Festival in 1981, 1983 and 1989, Saratoga Jazz Festival, JVC Jazz Fest 1991, Montreux Jazz Festival, New Orleans Jazz & Heritage Festival, Newport Jazz Festival in 1975, Puerto Rico Heineken Jazzfest 2001, Malta Jazz Festival 2003 at Maltese Islands, Novosadski Jazz Festival 2004, Belgium's Jazz Middelheim 2007. She performed at the annual North Sea Jazz Festival in The Hague in 1978 and has returned there at least 10 times. She has played with such artists as Steve Gadd, Anthony Jackson, Sammy Figueroa and Eddie Gómez.

== Discography ==
=== Albums ===
Year	Title	Genre	Label
1966	Apresentamos	Brazilian jazz	Continental
1971	Olha Quem Chega	Brazilian jazz	Odeon
1975	Via Brasil	Brazilian jazz	Sunny Side
1975	Via Brasil, Vol. 2	Brazilian jazz	Sunny Side
1978	Brazil with My Soul	Brazilian jazz	Barclay
1979	Live	Brazilian jazz	Accord
1979	Tania Maria in Copenhagen (with Niels-Henning Ørsted Pedersen)	Brazilian jazz	Accord
1980	Piquant	Brazilian jazz	Concord
1981	Taurus	Brazilian jazz	Concord
1983	Come with Me	Brazilian jazz	Concord
1984	Love Explosion	Brazilian jazz	Concord
1984	The Real Tania Maria: Wild!	Brazilian jazz	Concord
1985	Made in New York	Brazilian jazz	EMI
1986	Lady from Brazil	Brazilian jazz	EMI
1988	Forbidden Colors	Brazilian jazz	Capitol
1990	Bela Vista	Brazilian jazz	Blue Note
1993	Outrageous	Brazilian jazz	Concord
1993	The Best of Tania Maria	Brazilian jazz	Blue Note
1995	No Comment	Brazilian jazz	TKM
1995	Bluesilian	Brazilian jazz	TKM
1997	Europe	Brazilian jazz	TKM
2000	Viva Brazil	Brazilian jazz	Concord Records
2002	Happiness	Brazilian jazz	Recall Records UK
2002	Tania Maria Live at the Blue Note	Brazilian jazz	Concord
2003	Outrageously Wild	Brazilian jazz	Concord
2004	Olha Quem Chega (reissue)	Brazilian jazz	Import
2005	Intimidade	Brazilian jazz	Blue Note
2005	Tania Maria in Copenhagen (with Niels-Henning Ørsted Pedersen) (reissue)	Brazilian jazz	Stunt
2005	Brazil with My Soul (reissue)	Brazilian jazz	Universal
2011	Tempo (with Eddie Gómez)	Brazilian jazz	Naïve Records
2012	Canto	Brazilian jazz	Naïve Records

=== Filmography ===
- 2008: Tanya Maria: The Beat of Brazil with Laurindo Almeida

== See also ==
- "Chiclete com banana"
