= Kate Rogers =

Canadian singer

- Born: Kate Rogers
- Origin: Toronto, Ontario, Canada
- Genres: Pop, trip hop
- Occupation: Singer
- Instruments: Voice, acoustic guitar, baritone ukulele, harmonica
- Years active: 1998–present
- Label: Grand Central Records
- Website: www.katerogers.net

Kate Rogers is a Canadian singer from Toronto, Ontario, Canada.

== Biography ==
Rogers was raised in rural Ontario and studied at the Royal Conservatory of Music in Toronto for seven years. Her early career as a recording artist included vocals for Grand Central Records artists Rae & Christian and Aim.

She later attended Fashion Design College and during this period she recorded her first song at Grand Central's studio, entitled "Fine". The song was later released on the compilation album Central Heating 2 (2000). In 1999, she appeared on a track for Aim's debut album, Cold Water Music, which was followed by appearances on the records of several other Grand Central acts.

In 2004, she released her debut album, St. Eustacia. In 2005, she released the album Seconds, consisting of cover versions of songs from artists including The Smiths, Radiohead, The Pixies and Green Day.

In 2006, Rogers performed with Toronto indie band The Coast. Rogers' Beauregard was released in 2008 on Rogers' own independent record label under the group name "Kate Rogers Band".

Her fifth solo album, Repeat Repeat, was released in 2013 and was the first album that featured her as the sole songwriter.

She is the cousin of Mark Rae, the head of Grand Central Records.

== Discography ==
- Kate Rogers vs Grand Central (October 2003) (A collection of Rogers' appearances on other Grand Central Records artists' records)
- St. Eustacia (February 2004)
- Seconds (April 2005)
- Beauregard (October 2008)
- Gadabout (2010)
- Repeat Repeat (February 2013)

=== Compilation appearances ===
- Friends in Bellwoods II (2009): "The Same Party"
