= Aim (musician) =

British musician, DJ and producer

- Born: Andrew Turner
- Genres: Hip hop, electronica, trip hop
- Occupations: DJ, record producer
- Instruments: Turntables, keyboards, drums, guitar
- Years active: 1995–present
- Labels: ATIC Records 2005–present Grand Central 1995–2005
- Website: Aim at ATIC Records

Andrew Turner, known by the recording name Aim, is a British musician, DJ and producer.

Aim's sound is a blend of funky electronic music and hip hop beats, a sound which typified the Grand Central Records label. Much of his work is instrumental, though his records include collaborations with other artists who provide vocals, including Stephen Jones of Babybird, Diamond D, Souls of Mischief, YZ, QNC and Kate Rogers.

Aim has also worked as remixer, mixing songs for a variety of artists including Ian Brown, Saint Etienne, The Charlatans, Lil' Kim, Thunderbugs, Archive, Down to the Bone, Texas and former label-mates Rae & Christian.

== Career ==
Turner's first musical output was in a fledgling indie band called The Chelsea Flower Show. His father was a jazz drummer and instrument shop owner and after the demise of the band, Turner followed in his father's footsteps, opening a record shop called Speed Limit Records. It was here that he began to hone his skills on the decks, helping him to embark upon a serious music career. Enthused by the burgeoning rave scene in the North West of England and regular trips to the Haçienda nightclub, with Gripper he co-hosted several successful club and rave nights in his hometown, including Yummy and Euphoria, and has continued to DJ regularly ever since. This includes London's famous Fabric, for which he produced the August 2004 edition FabricLive.17 as part of the Fabric Live series.

He was discovered by Mark Rae, after handing him a demo tape in Manchester, and signed to Grand Central. So far he has released three full-length studio albums – Cold Water Music, Hinterland and Flight 602, plus an album collecting together his early singles, and two DJ mix albums.

In 2004, Aim produced the fellow ex-Grand Central artist, Niko's debut album, Life on Earth.

Aim left Grand Central Records in early 2005 and formed his own independent record label, ATIC Records, in June 2005, and his own recording studio, Speed Limit Studios. The first album to be released on the label was Aim's Flight 602. It was released on 25 September 2006. Niko has also signed to ATIC and has returned Aim's earlier favour, by providing vocals for the new album. The final single to be released from Flight 602 was the "Birchwood" EP, released on 5 November 2007.

Aim also began a new collaboration, Paperboy, with British musician Rick Walker on guitar and writing duties, and vocals by Justin Helliwell, the singer from The Chelsea Flower Show, the band the pair were members of in their younger days.

To expand beyond the confines of a touring solely as a DJ, Aim began touring with a full live band in the early 2000s. This band consolidated into a 10-piece ensemble, with musicians playing drums, electric double bass, percussion, guitars, keyboards, trumpet, saxophone, synthesizer and vocals provided by Niko. The band's extensive UK tour included an appearance at Glastonbury Festival in 2007.

As of 2007 Aim was performing production duties on ATIC Records artists' albums, including Sevens' debut Defiance in Mind, Crowhead's Born With Teeth and Niko's second album. He was also preparing tracks for his next solo album.

== Discography ==
Album information
Cold Water Music
- Released: 11 October 1999
- Label: Grand Central Records
- Cat no: GCCD105
- Singles: "From Here To Fame" / "Journey To The End Of The Night", "Sail", "The Force", "True To Hip Hop", "Cold Water Music EP"
Hinterland
- Released: 26 February 2002
- Label: Grand Central Records
- Cat no: GCCD112
- Singles: "Good Disease", "No Restriction", "The Girl Who Fell Through The Ice", "The Omen"
Flight 602
- Released: 25 September 2006
- Label: ATIC Records
- Cat no: ATICCD001
- Singles: "Northwest", "Puget Sound", "Birchwood EP"
Drum Machines and VHS Dreams
- Released: 2014
- Label:
- Cat no:
- Singles:
The Habit of a Lifetime (And How to Kick It)
- Released: 2015
- Label:
- Cat no:
- Singles:
