= Tony D =

American hip hop artist (1966–2009)

Anthony Depula (June 28, 1966 – April 4, 2009), known professionally as Tony D, was an American hip hop artist from Imperial Valley, California.

== Career ==
Although Tony D was an MC and a DJ, he was most famous for being an influential producer in hip-hop music. He was the producer behind Poor Righteous Teachers, YZ, Blaque Spurm, Baby Chill and the Funk Family. He has also produced tracks for Young Zee, Outsidaz, Pace Won, Blvd Mosse, King Sun's Righteous but Ruthless, Scott Lark, Kwest tha Madd Lad and Shawn Lov.

Tony D was the first artist to have a record released on Mark Rae's burgeoning British independent label Grand Central Records, then called Gone Clear Records). His other albums were released on his label Cha-Ching Records and 4th & B'way/Island/PolyGram Records. He was also a part of the group Crusaders for Real Hip-Hop, which released one album on Profile Records called Déjà Vu - It’s ‘82.

Tony D's early records were sampled by several artists, including Naughty by Nature on the hit "O.P.P." from their self-titled album and by Heavy D without permission. All cases were settled out of court. Apart from Tony D, Depula was also known professionally under the names Harvee Wallbangar, Don Nots, Don Sluggo, the Goombata and, in his earliest credits, Grand Pubha Tony D. Later in life, Depula hosted a weekly hip-hop radio show on Princeton University's 103.3 FM WPRB, which aired in Central New Jersey.

== Death ==
DePula died on April 4, 2009, after being involved in a car accident near his home in Hamilton Township, Mercer County, New Jersey.

== Discography ==
- Music Makes You Move (1989)
- Euro-K (1990) (DJ mix)
- Droppin' Funky Verses (1991) U.S. R&B #71
- Déjà Vu - It’s ‘82 (with Crusaders for Real Hip-Hop) (1992)
- Flav (Beats) from the Cave (1994)
- Trenton Connection (1996)
- Pound for Pound (1997)
- Master of the Moaning Beats (2001)
- Revone - I'm Still Here (2002)
- Da Goodfella (2020)
