= Grand Central Records =

English independent record label

- Founded: 1995
- Founder: Mark Rae
- Defunct: 2006
- Genre: Electronic, hip hop
- Country of origin: United Kingdom
- Location: Manchester
- Official website: http://www.grandcentralrecords.co.uk

Grand Central Records was an independent record label based in the Northern Quarter of Manchester, England. It was started in 1995 by DJ Mark Rae (who, along with Steve Christian makes up the duo Rae & Christian). Rae started out working as manager of the Fat City Records' store (which later also became a record label licensing material). The two labels maintained a close relationship, co-hosting club nights including Friends and Family, Counter Culture and developing related radio shows and merchandising. Grand Central also had a digital sub-label, GC3 which developed in the early to mid 2000's.

The label invested in various music artists and performers developing and promoting both physical music releases and subsidising live tours, for artists predominantly from the UK and the North West of England. Several high profile collaborations with international artists such as Bobby Womack, The Jungle Brothers, Sharleen Spiteiri from Texas and others meant the label achieved profile way beyond its size.

Embracing emerging digital culture, Grand Central established early company websites and an online merchandising shop, using this as a creative shop window for its artists and developing the visual and music personality of the collective.

As of May 2006, Grand Central Records ceased operating as a record label and the official website was closed down.

The label was allegedly investigated by the MCPS with regard to unpaid royalties and the resultant bill was allegedly so large that it forced the label into liquidation.

== Artists ==
- Aim
- ARP
- Boca 45
- Broadway Project
- Dual Control
- Fingathing
- Funky Fresh Few
- Ill Gotten Gains
- Jon Kennedy
- Kate Rogers
- Kohei Mihara
- Mark Rae
- Niko
- Only Child
- Rae & Christian
- Riton
- Rob Smith
- Tony D

== After Grand Central ==
- Aim left Grand Central Records in early 2005 and formed his own record label, ATIC Records, in June 2006 and released his label debut Flight 602 later the same year. Niko has also signed to ATIC Records, along with Gripper and Paperboy.
- Boca 45 released his second album, Vertigo Sounds, on German record label Unique Records in 2006.
- Fingathing released an EP, Apocalypso in 2006 from their own website. Subsequent releases have been on MP3 only, via the "Artists First" internet label. DJ Sneaky has since recorded solo, releasing a digital 4-track EP, with an album to follow, entitled Feel Like a King... Pluck a String.
- Jon Kennedy released a 12" single, Demons in 2007 on his new label, The Jon Kennedy Federation.
- Mark Rae initially started a new recording partnership with Rhys Adams in 2005, under the name ARP (Adams.Rae.Productions). In 2007, the pair started a new record label, Yes King Recordings and a new band, Yes King. Veba appeared amongst the vocalists on the Yes King album, Rock This World (2008). Future solo releases from Mark Rae and from Rae & Christian are also expected to be released on the new label.
- The Nudge followed Aim to ATIC Records, and now records under the name Crowhead.
- Riton has released several 12" singles on different European labels, and has also released an eponymous album under the recording name Eine Kleine Nacht Musik.
- Rob Smith released two 12" singles, Give Love (2006) and Loveage (2007) on Functional Breaks.

== Grand Central Records compilation albums ==
| Album | Release date | Catalogue number |
|---|---|---|
| Frying the Fat | 8 December 1995 | GCCD100 |
| Central Heating | 25 November 1996 | GCCD101 |
| Central Reservations | 15 September 1997 | GCCD103 |
| Central Heating 2 | 17 April 2000 | GCCD106 |
| Ordered from the Catalogue (DJ: Mark Rae) | 7 May 2001 | GCCD110 |
| Grand Central Vol. 1 | 24 February 2003 | GCCD117 |
| Grand Central Vol. 2 | 29 September 2003 | GCCD122 |
| Kate Rogers vs Grand Central (Artist: Kate Rogers) | 6 October 2003 | GCCD124 |
| Grand Central Translation (DJ: Qool DJ Marv) | 19 April 2004 | GCCD132 |
| Veba vs Grand Central (Artist: Veba) | 25 January 2005 | GCCD134 |
| Grand Central Vol. 3 | 21 February 2005 | GCCD135 |
| Underground Crown Holders | 23 May 2005 | GCCD138 |

== See also ==
- Lists of record labels
- List of electronic music record labels
- ATIC Records
