= Grammy Award for Best Rap Performance =

Honor presented to artists for rap performances

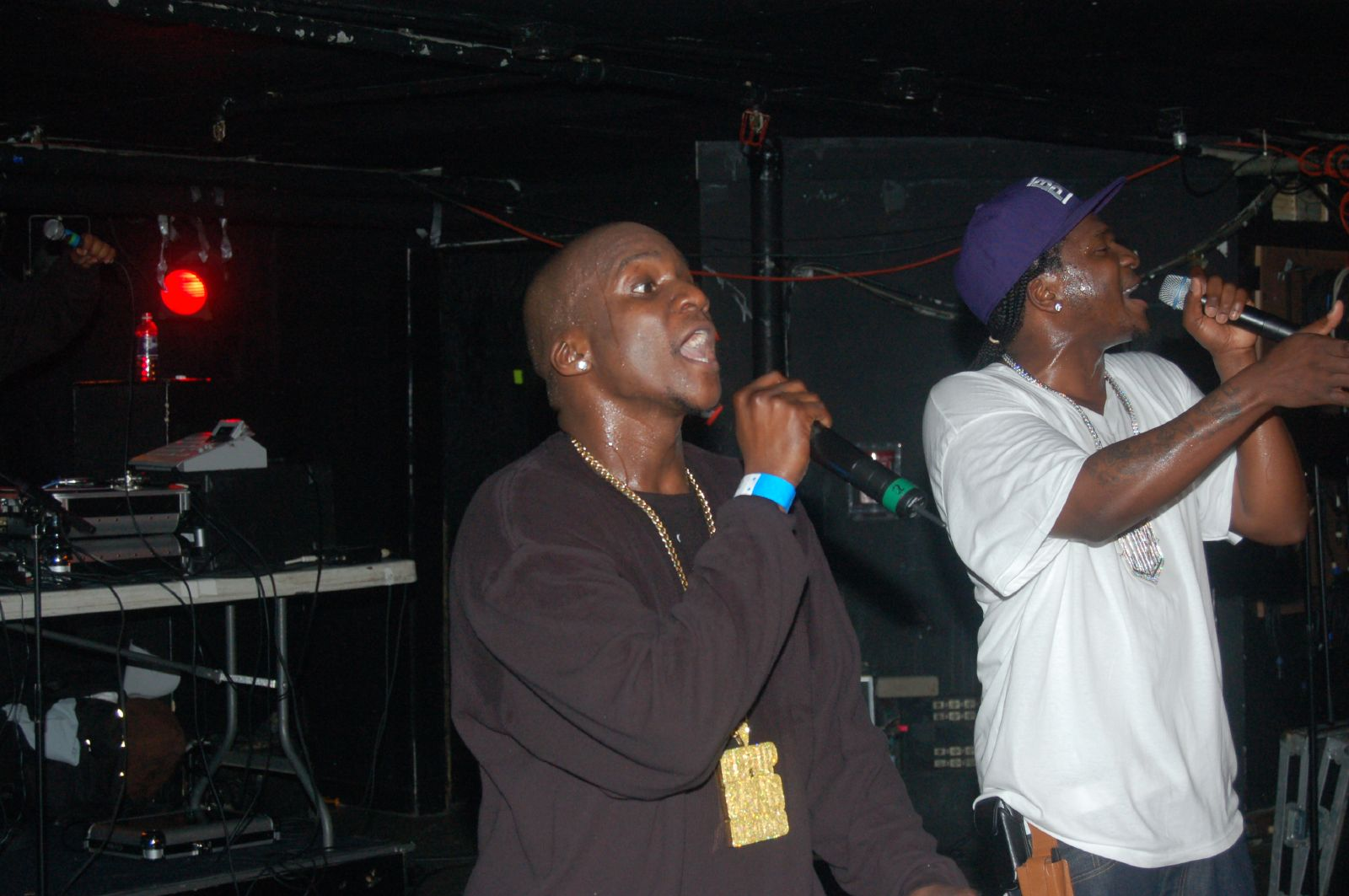
- "Chains & Whips" by Clipse (pictured) featuring Kendrick Lamar & Pharrell Williams is the most recent recipient
- Awarded for: Quality rap performances
- Country: United States
- Presented by: National Academy of Recording Arts and Sciences
- First award: 1989
- Currently held by: Clipse featuring Kendrick Lamar & Pharrell Williams, "Chains & Whips" (2026)
- Website: grammy.com

The Grammy Award for Best Rap Performance is an honor presented to recording artists for quality rap performances. It was first presented at the 31st Annual Grammy Awards in 1989 and again at the 32nd Annual Grammy Awards in 1990, after which point the award was split into two categories: Best Rap Solo Performance and Best Rap Performance by a Duo or Group. These two categories were combined again in 2012 as a result of a restructure of Grammy categories, and the reinstated Award for Best Rap Performance was presented at the 54th Grammy Awards in 2012. The restructuring was the consequence of the Recording Academy's wish to decrease the number of categories and awards and to eliminate distinctions between solo and duo or group performances.

The Grammy Awards, an annual ceremony established in 1958, and originally called the Gramophone Awards, are presented by the National Academy of Recording Arts and Sciences (NARAS) of the United States to "honor artistic achievement, technical proficiency and overall excellence in the recording industry, without regard to album sales or chart position".

The award goes to the artist. The producer, engineer, and songwriter can apply for a Winner's Certificate.

The first award for Best Rap Performance was presented to DJ Jazzy Jeff & The Fresh Prince (the vocal duo consisting of DJ Jazzy Jeff and Will Smith) for "Parents Just Don't Understand". The ceremony was not without controversy; nominees Jeff and Smith led a boycott in protest of the awards presentation not being televised, and some members of the rap community felt that more qualified artists were overlooked. After the reintroduction of the category in 2012, American rappers Jay-Z and Kanye West won the award two consecutive times; the two rappers were surpassed in terms of wins by fellow American rapper Kendrick Lamar, who holds the record with eight awards. American rapper Megan Thee Stallion and American singer-songwriter Beyoncé became the first female artists to win the category with "Savage (Remix)".

== Background ==
The Best Rap Performance category was first presented at the 31st Annual Grammy Awards in 1989. NARAS President Mike Green said in Billboard that the music genre has "matured into several kinds of music, with several kinds of artists doing it". Diane Theriot, a representative of the awards department for the academy, recalled being "inundated with eligible rap entries during the first few years of having the category". In 1991, the category was split into the categories Best Rap Solo Performance and Best Rap Performance by a Duo or Group. Recognizing that both categories were continuing to receive numerous entries, the Best Rap Album recognition was established for the 38th Grammy Awards in 1996—the inaugural award was presented to Naughty by Nature for Poverty's Paradise. In 2003, the Best Rap Solo Performance category was divided into separate recognitions for Female and Male Rap Solo Performances. The categories remained separated by gender until 2005 when they were combined into the genderless category originally known as Best Rap Solo Performance. Additional rap categories include Best Rap/Sung Collaboration and Best Rap Song, established in 2002 and 2004, respectively.

== History ==
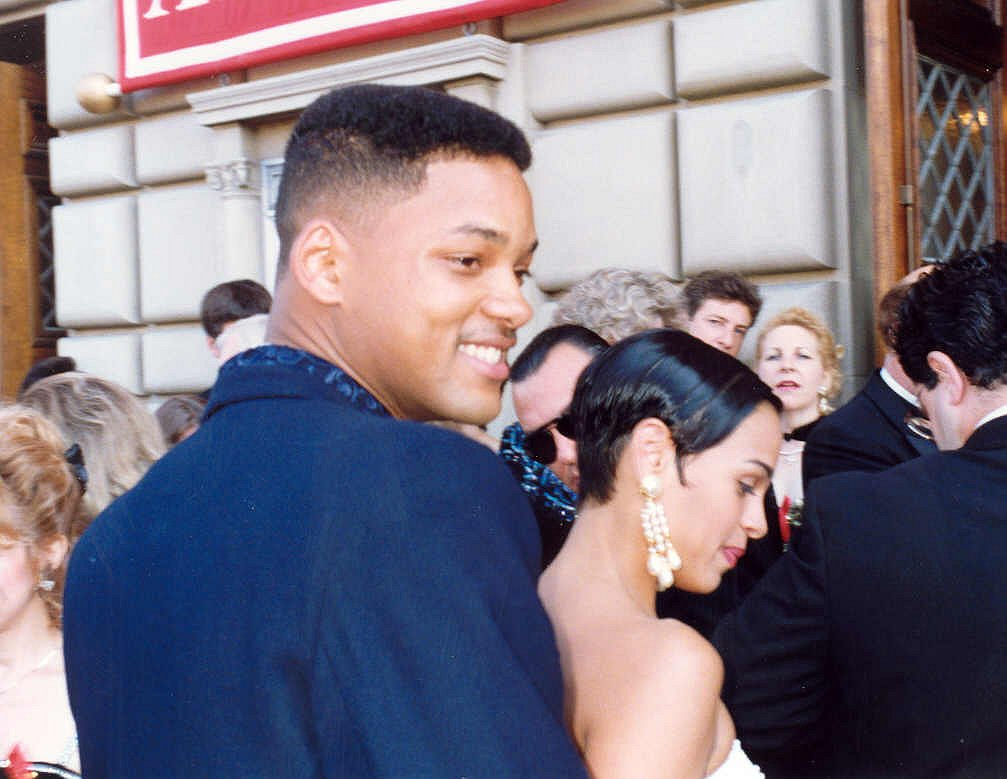
1989 award winner and 1990 nominee Will Smith of the duo DJ Jazzy Jeff & The Fresh Prince at the Emmy Awards in 1993

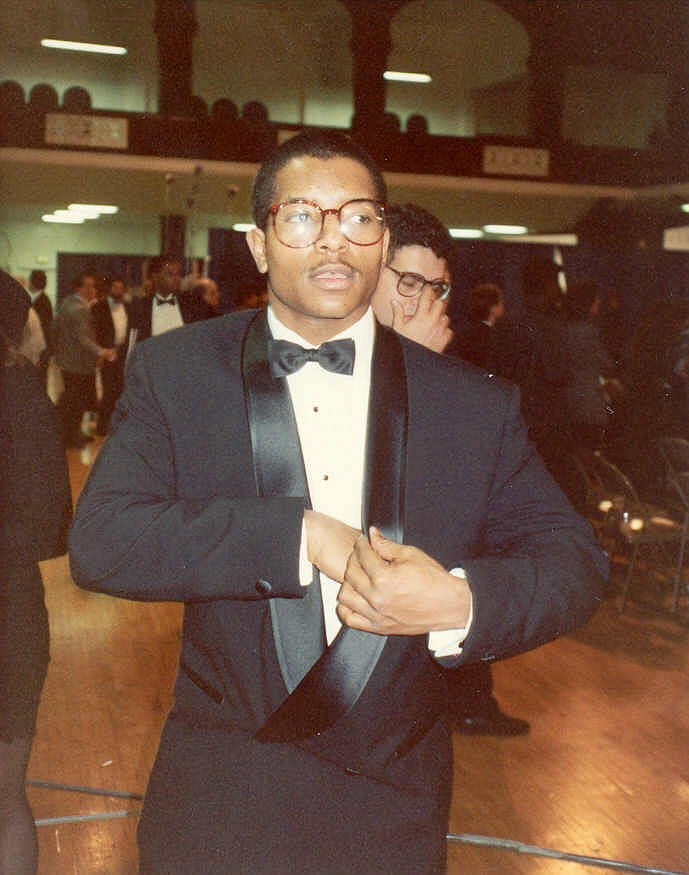
Award winner Young MC at the 32nd Annual Grammy Awards (1990)

For the 31st Grammy Awards (1989), Best Rap Performance nominees included DJ Jazzy Jeff & The Fresh Prince for "Parents Just Don't Understand", J. J. Fad for "Supersonic" (from the album of the same name), Kool Moe Dee for "Wild Wild West", LL Cool J for "Going Back to Cali", and Salt-n-Pepa (the duo consisting of Cheryl James and Sandra Denton) for "Push It". The duo known as DJ Jazzy Jeff & The Fresh Prince consisted of DJ Jazzy Jeff (birth name Jeffrey Townes) and actor Will Smith, whose nickname also appeared in the American television sitcom The Fresh Prince of Bel-Air, in which he starred. "Parents Just Don't Understand" appeared on the duo's 1988 album He's the DJ, I'm the Rapper. "Going Back to Cali" appeared on the soundtrack to the film Less than Zero as well as LL Cool J's 1989 studio album Walking with a Panther. Kool Moe Dee's "Wild Wild West" and Salt-n-Pepa's "Push It" appeared on the albums How Ya Like Me Now and Hot, Cool & Vicious, respectively.

Rap and heavy metal categories were introduced the same year (along with Best Bluegrass Album), but, according to the show's producers, time constraints prevented both categories from being televised. Nominee Kool Moe Dee performed during the ceremony, but the rap award was presented during the "usually fast-paced pre-televised ceremony". DJ Jazzy Jeff and Will Smith led a boycott of the ceremony and were joined by fellow nominees LL Cool J and Salt-n-Pepa. Salt-n-Pepa issued the following statement: "If they don't want us, we don't want them." Adding to the controversy surrounding the category, some members of the rap community believed artists such as Big Daddy Kane, KRS-One, and N.W.A (whose debut album Straight Outta Compton "launched gangsta rap") were overlooked. Awards were presented to Jeff and Smith at the Shrine Auditorium in Los Angeles. While Smith was absent from the ceremony, Jeff was present to accept his award. In 2004, Serena Kappes of People magazine ranked Smith's ceremony boycott number eight on its list of Top 10 Grammy Moments. Jeff and Smith were also recognized by the American Music Awards in 1989 with awards for Favorite Rap Artists and Favorite Rap Album, and "Parent's Just Don't Understand" also earned the duo the first MTV Video Music Award for Best Rap Video. Smith later earned Best Rap Solo Performance awards in 1998 for "Men in Black" and 1999 for "Gettin' Jiggy wit It", and was nominated again in 2000 for "Wild Wild West".

Nominees for the 32nd Annual Grammy Awards included De La Soul for "Me Myself and I", DJ Jazzy Jeff & The Fresh Prince for "I Think I Can Beat Mike Tyson", Public Enemy for "Fight the Power", Tone Lōc for "Funky Cold Medina", and Young MC for "Bust a Move". "Me Myself and I" appears on De La Soul's studio album 3 Feet High and Rising and in 2008 was ranked number 46 on VH1's list of the 100 Greatest Hip Hop Songs Ever!!! "I Think I Can Beat Mike Tyson", written by the duo along with Pete Harris, appears on DJ Jazzy Jeff & The Fresh Prince's third album And in This Corner.... "Fight the Power" appeared on the 1988 soundtrack for the film Do the Right Thing and later on Public Enemy's third studio album Fear of a Black Planet (1990). The song ranked number one on VH1's aforementioned list, number 40 on AFI's 100 Years...100 Songs list, and number 322 on Rolling Stone's 2004 list of "The 500 Greatest Songs of All Time". "Funky Cold Medina", written by Young MC, Michael L. Ross and Matt Dike, first appeared on Tone Lōc's debut album Lōc-ed After Dark. "Bust a Move" appeared on Young MC's debut album Stone Cold Rhymin'. Allmusic editor Stephen Thomas Erlewine described the song as "unabashed catchy" due to its "skittish, rhythmic guitar riff, looped beats", backing vocals, and "funny" rhymes. The award was presented to Young MC. In 2010, Joshua Ostroff of Spinner included Young MC's win on his list of "The Grammy Awards' Biggest Mistakes", asserting that "Bust a Move" was merely a "fun little hip-pop song" while "Fight the Power" was a "revelatory single that still stands tall as one of music's greatest (and funkiest) political statements and perhaps hip-hop's finest moment".

== Recipients ==
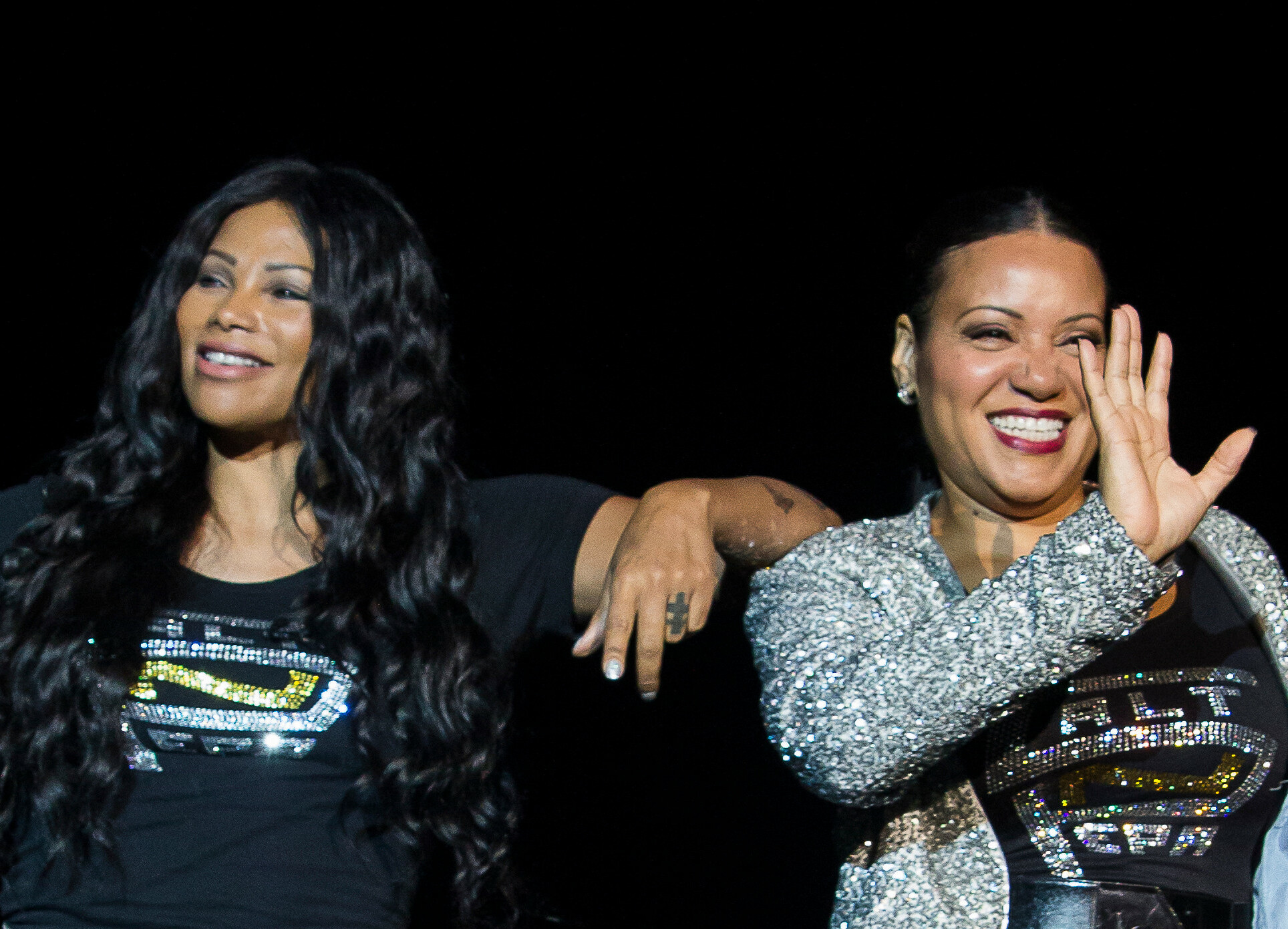
Salt-N-Pepa were among the first female rappers to be nominated in the category.

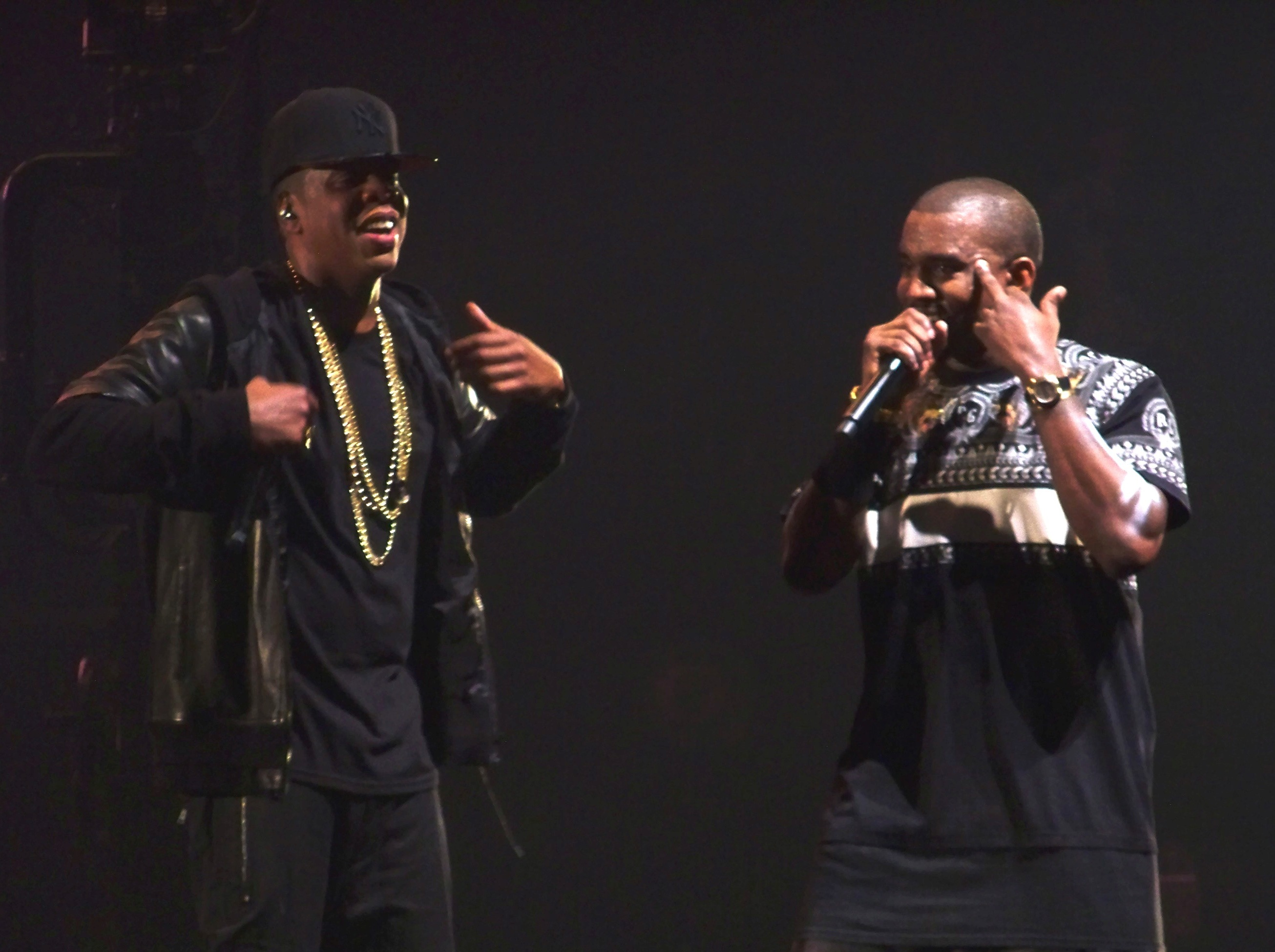
Jay-Z and Kanye West held the record for most wins until 2018 with two awards as a result of their collaborative album Watch the Throne.

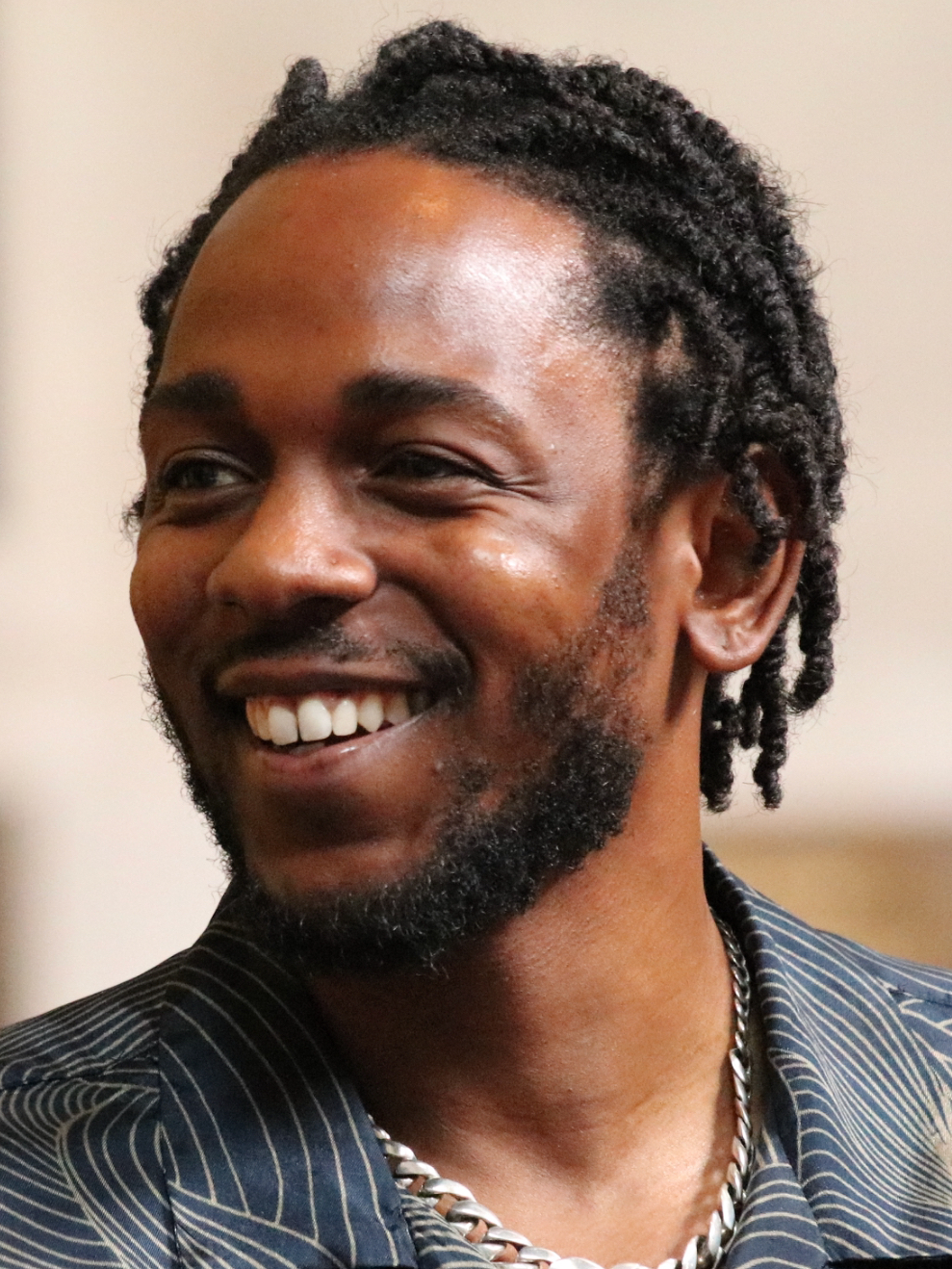
Eight-time winner Kendrick Lamar, the most in the category.

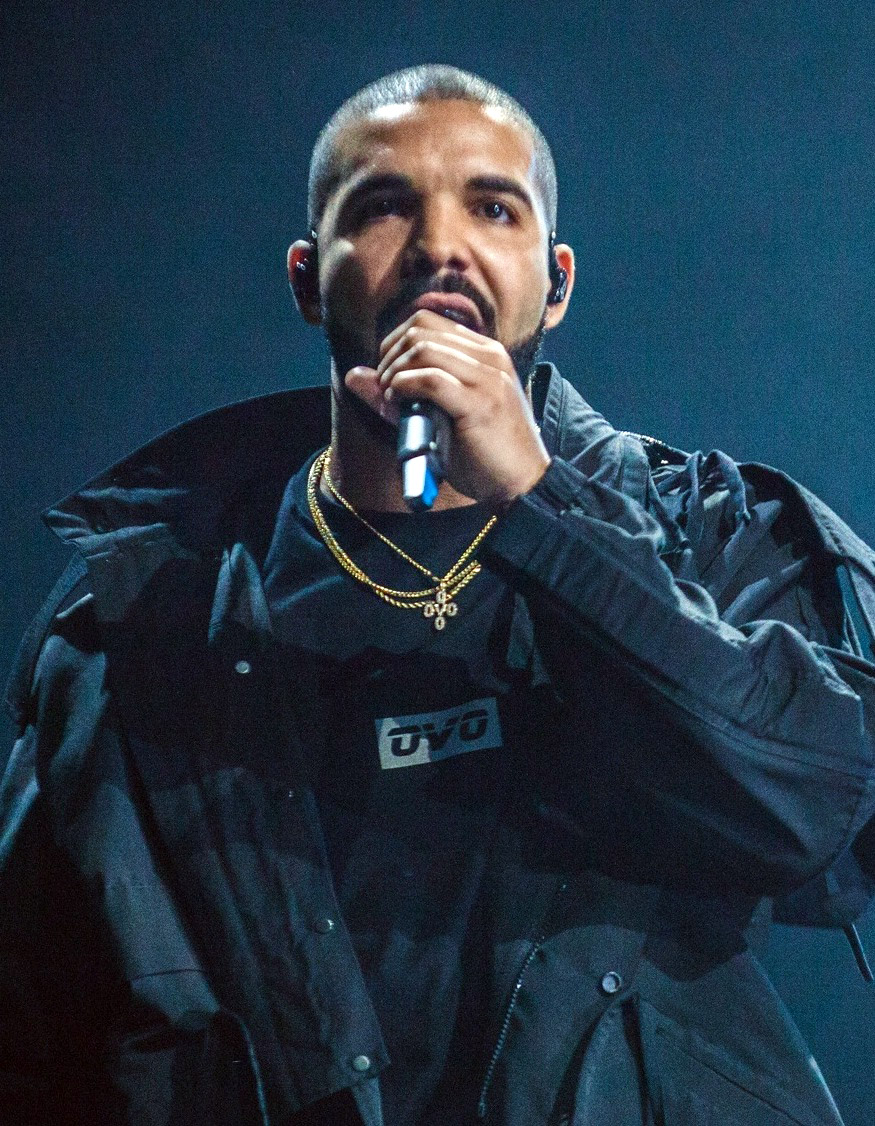
Drake is the second most nominated act of the category with 11, although he has never won the award.

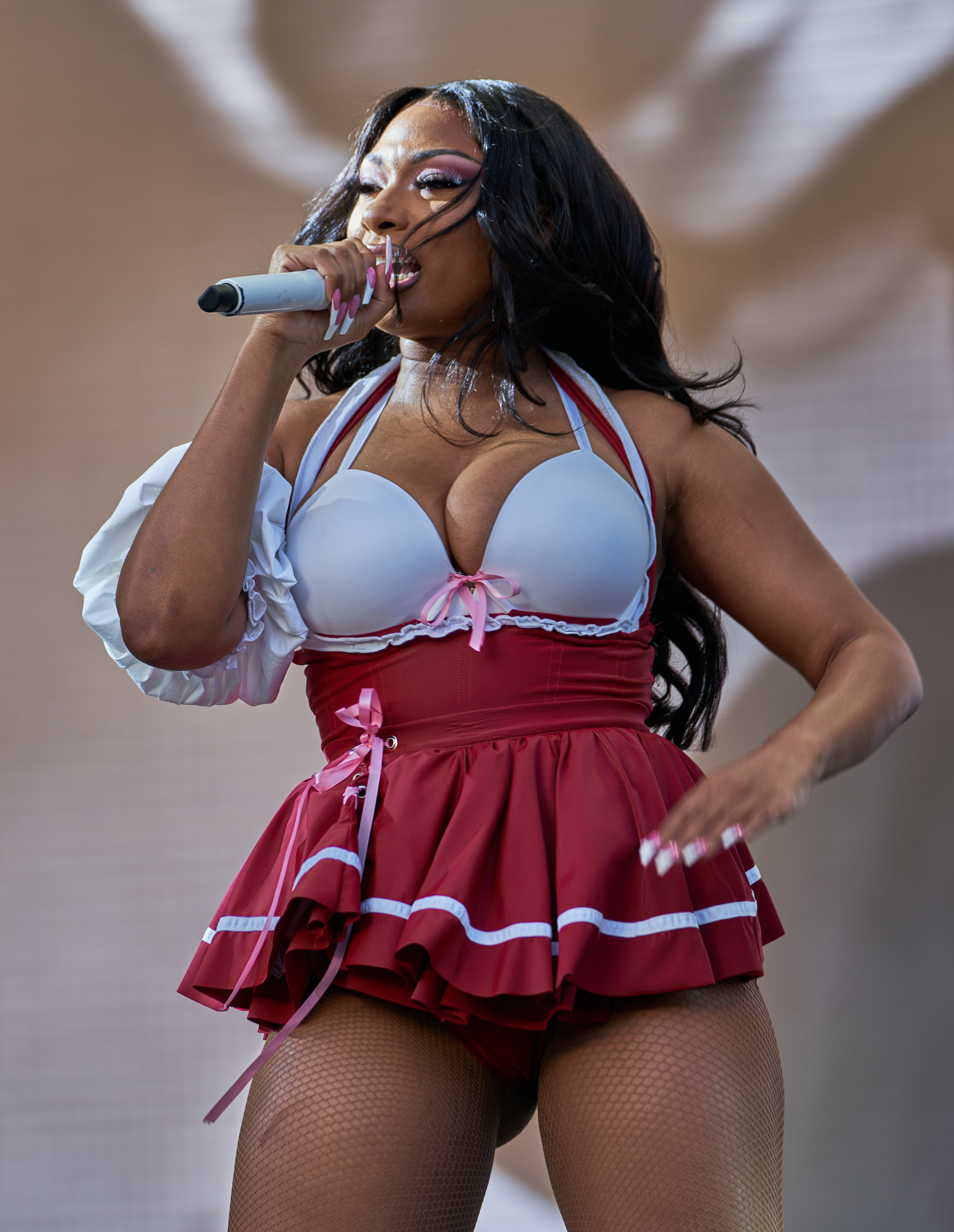
Megan Thee Stallion became the first female rapper to win the award, alongside Beyoncé.

=== 1980s ===
| Year | Artist | Work |
|---|---|---|
1989
| 1989 | DJ Jazzy Jeff & the Fresh Prince | "Parents Just Don't Understand" |
| 1989 | J. J. Fad | "Supersonic" |
| 1989 | Kool Moe Dee | "Wild Wild West" |
| 1989 | LL Cool J | "Going Back to Cali" |
| 1989 | Salt-n-Pepa | "Push It" |

=== 1990s ===
| Year | Artist | Work |
|---|---|---|
1990
| 1990 | Young MC | "Bust a Move" |
| 1990 | De La Soul | "Me Myself and I" |
| 1990 | DJ Jazzy Jeff & the Fresh Prince | "I Think I Can Beat Mike Tyson" |
| 1990 | Public Enemy | "Fight the Power" |
| 1990 | Tone Lōc | "Funky Cold Medina" |

=== 2010s ===
| Year | Artist | Work |
|---|---|---|
2012
| 2012 | Jay-Z and Kanye West | "Otis" |
| 2012 | Chris Brown featuring Lil Wayne and Busta Rhymes | "Look at Me Now" |
| 2012 | Lupe Fiasco | "The Show Goes On" |
| 2012 | Nicki Minaj featuring Drake | "Moment 4 Life" |
| 2012 | Wiz Khalifa | "Black and Yellow" |
2013
| 2013 | Jay-Z and Kanye West | "Niggas in Paris" |
| 2013 | Drake featuring Lil Wayne | "HYFR (Hell Ya Fucking Right)" |
| 2013 | Nas | "Daughters" |
| 2013 | Kanye West, Big Sean, Pusha T and 2 Chainz | "Mercy" |
| 2013 | Young Jeezy featuring Jay-Z and André 3000 | "I Do" |
2014
| 2014 | Macklemore and Ryan Lewis featuring Wanz | "Thrift Shop" |
| 2014 | Drake | "Started from the Bottom" |
| 2014 | Eminem | "Berzerk" |
| 2014 | Jay-Z | "Tom Ford" |
| 2014 | Kendrick Lamar | "Swimming Pools (Drank)" |
2015
| 2015 | Kendrick Lamar | "I" |
| 2015 | Childish Gambino | "3005" |
| 2015 | Drake | "0 to 100 / The Catch Up" |
| 2015 | Eminem | "Rap God" |
| 2015 | Lecrae | "All I Need Is You" |
2016
| 2016 | Kendrick Lamar | "Alright" |
| 2016 | J. Cole | "Apparently" |
| 2016 | Drake | "Back to Back" |
| 2016 | Fetty Wap | "Trap Queen" |
| 2016 | Nicki Minaj featuring Drake and Lil Wayne | "Truffle Butter" |
| 2016 | Kanye West featuring Theophilus London, Allan Kingdom and Paul McCartney | "All Day" |
2017
| 2017 | Chance the Rapper featuring Lil Wayne and 2 Chainz | "No Problem" |
| 2017 | Desiigner | "Panda" |
| 2017 | Drake featuring The Throne | "Pop Style" |
| 2017 | Fat Joe and Remy Ma featuring French Montana and Infared | "All the Way Up" |
| 2017 | ScHoolboy Q featuring Kanye West | "That Part" |
2018
| 2018 | Kendrick Lamar | "Humble." |
| 2018 | Big Sean | "Bounce Back" |
| 2018 | Cardi B | "Bodak Yellow" |
| 2018 | Jay-Z | "4:44" |
| 2018 | Migos featuring Lil Uzi Vert | "Bad and Boujee" |
2019
| 2019 | Anderson .Paak (TIE) | "Bubblin'" |
| 2019 | Kendrick Lamar, Jay Rock, Future and James Blake (TIE) | "King's Dead" |
| 2019 | Cardi B | "Be Careful" |
| 2019 | Drake | "Nice for What" |
| 2019 | Travis Scott, Drake, Swae Lee and Big Hawk | "Sicko Mode" |

=== 2020s ===
| Year | Artist | Work |
|---|---|---|
2020
| 2020 | Nipsey Hussle featuring Roddy Ricch and Hit-Boy | "Racks in the Middle" |
| 2020 | J. Cole | "Middle Child" |
| 2020 | DaBaby | "Suge" |
| 2020 | Dreamville featuring JID, Bas, J. Cole, EarthGang and Young Nudy | "Down Bad" |
| 2020 | Offset featuring Cardi B | "Clout" |
2021
| 2021 | Megan Thee Stallion featuring Beyoncé | "Savage" |
| 2021 | Big Sean featuring Nipsey Hussle | "Deep Reverence" |
| 2021 | DaBaby | "BOP" |
| 2021 | Jack Harlow | "Whats Poppin" |
| 2021 | Lil Baby | "The Bigger Picture" |
| 2021 | Pop Smoke | "Dior" |
2022
| 2022 | Baby Keem and Kendrick Lamar | "Family Ties" |
| 2022 | Cardi B | "Up" |
| 2022 | J. Cole featuring 21 Savage and Morray | "My Life" |
| 2022 | Drake featuring Future and Young Thug | "Way 2 Sexy" (withdrawn) |
| 2022 | Megan Thee Stallion | "Thot Shit" |
2023
| 2023 | Kendrick Lamar | "The Heart Part 5" |
| 2023 | DJ Khaled featuring Rick Ross, Lil Wayne, Jay-Z, John Legend and Fridayy | "God Did" |
| 2023 | Doja Cat | "Vegas" |
| 2023 | Gunna and Future featuring Young Thug | "Pushin P" |
| 2023 | Hitkidd and GloRilla | "F.N.F. (Let's Go)" |
2024
| 2024 | Killer Mike featuring André 3000, Future and Eryn Allen Kane | "Scientists & Engineers" |
| 2024 | Baby Keem featuring Kendrick Lamar | "The Hillbillies" |
| 2024 | Black Thought | "Love Letter" |
| 2024 | Drake and 21 Savage | "Rich Flex" |
| 2024 | Coi Leray | "Players" |
2025
| 2025 | Kendrick Lamar | "Not Like Us" |
| 2025 | Cardi B | "Enough (Miami)" |
| 2025 | Common and Pete Rock featuring Posdnuos | "When the Sun Shines Again" |
| 2025 | Doechii | "Nissan Altima" |
| 2025 | Future, Metro Boomin and Kendrick Lamar | "Like That" |
| 2025 | GloRilla | "Yeah Glo!" |
2026
| 2026 | Clipse featuring Kendrick Lamar and Pharrell Williams | "Chains & Whips" |
| 2026 | Cardi B | "Outside" |
| 2026 | Doechii | "Anxiety" |
| 2026 | Kendrick Lamar featuring Lefty Gunplay | "TV Off" |
| 2026 | Tyler, the Creator featuring Teezo Touchdown | "Darling, I" |
2027
| 2027 | Baby Keem featuring Kendrick Lamar and Momo Boyd | "Good Flirts" |
| 2027 | Cardi B | "ErrTime" |
| 2027 | De La Soul featuring Nas | "Run It Back!!" |
| 2027 | T.I. | "Let 'Em Know" |
| 2027 | Don Toliver | "Body" |

== Artists with multiple wins ==
8 wins

- Kendrick Lamar

2 wins

- Future
- Jay-Z
- Kanye West

== Artists with multiple nominations ==
13 nominations

- Kendrick Lamar

11 nominations

- Drake

7 nominations

- Cardi B
- Jay-Z (1 shared with The Throne)

6 nominations

- Kanye West (1 shared with The Throne)

5 nominations

- Future
- Lil Wayne

4 nominations

- J. Cole

3 nominations

- Baby Keem
- Big Sean
- Eminem

2 nominations

- André 3000
- DaBaby
- De La Soul
- DJ Jazzy Jeff & The Fresh Prince
- Doechii
- GloRilla
- Megan Thee Stallion
- Nas
- Nicki Minaj
- Offset (1 shared with Migos)
- 2 Chainz
- 21 Savage
- Nipsey Hussle
- Young Thug

== See also ==
- History of hip hop music
