= All Through the Night (Tone Loc song) =

Single by Tone Lōc featuring El DeBarge

from the album Cool Hand Lōc
- Released: October 29, 1991
- Recorded: 1990
- Genre: Hip hop
- Length: 4:55
- Label: Delicious Vinyl
- Songwriters: Tone Lōc, Eric M Johnson, Anthony R Joseph
- Producer: Matt Dike

Tone Lōc singles chronology
"I Got It Goin' On" (1990)	"All Through the Night" (1991)	"Cool Hand Loc" (1992)

"All Through the Night" is a single by Tone Lōc and El DeBarge from Tone Lōc's second album, Cool Hand Lōc.

Following the huge success of Lōc-ed After Dark and two of its three singles ("Wild Thing" and "Funky Cold Medina"), Tone Lōc released his sophomore album Cool Hand Lōc. "All Through the Night", featuring R&B star El DeBarge, was released in advance of its album on October 29, 1991.

"All Through the Night" found moderate success, reaching #80 on the Billboard Hot 100 and #16 on the Rap Songs chart. However, compared to his previous singles, "All Through the Night" failed to live up to expectations. Despite its poor performance in radio and sales, the music video received heavy airplay on MTV and BET. It is his last single to chart.

A remix was made featuring Tone Lōc's labelmates, the Brand New Heavies.

== Single Track Listing ==
1. "All Through The Night" feat. The Brand New Heavies (Remix)
2. "All Through The Night" (BNH Beats)
3. "All Through The Night" (Big Beats)
4. "All Through The Night" (Radio Version)
5. "Pimp Without A Caddy"
6. "Pimp Without A Caddy" (Instrumental)
