= Cool Hand Loc =

Cool Hand Lōc

Studio album by Tone Lōc
- Released: November 19, 1991
- Studio: Power Play Studios; Cherokee Studios
- Genre: Hip hop
- Length: 50:22
- Label: Delicious Vinyl
- Producer: Def Jef; Matt Dike; Michael Ross; Quicksilver; Sir Jinx; Tone Lōc; Tony Joseph; M. Walk; William Michael Tate

Tone Lōc chronology
Lōc-ed After Dark (1989)	Cool Hand Lōc (1991)

Singles from Cool Hand Lōc
- 1. "All Through the Night" Released: 1991

Cool Hand Lōc is the second studio album by American rapper Tone Lōc. It was released on November 19, 1991, via Delicious Vinyl. The album was produced by Michael Ross, Matt Dike, Tony Joseph, Quicksilver, Def Jef, Sir Jinx, and Tone Loc, with co-production from M. Walk and William Michael Tate. It features guest appearances from Kenyatta, Def Jef, El DeBarge, and MC Wink Dog. The album peaked at number 46 on the Billboard Top R&B/Hip-Hop Albums chart. Its lead single, "All Through the Night", peaked at number 80 on the Billboard Hot 100.

== Critical reception ==
Professional ratings
Review scores
Source	Rating
AllMusic	3/5 stars
Entertainment Weekly	C+
Rolling Stone	3/5 stars

Alex Henderson of AllMusic called the album "a respectable and satisfying effort". Alan Light of Rolling Stone wrote, "Cool Hand Lōc includes several love songs, which are rescued from sappiness by Loc's seductive, slow-rolling delivery; these are balanced by a couple of Ice-T-style gangsta tales". James Bernard of Entertainment Weekly wrote, "Tone-Loc has a lot to prove and Cool Hand Lōc aches with this need. As raspy as ever, Loc tries to break from his party-party image and convince us that he's a product of the concrete jungle (as on the engaging, bouncy "Funky West Side") and a hustler to boot (as on the lackluster "Pimp Without a Caddy"). "Fatal Attraction" recaptures the playful storytelling and catchy hooks of "Wild Thing" and "Funky Cold Medina". But there's not much else that promises to reclaim what Loc once had: The two slow love jams he throws in will neither enhance his street image nor make an R&B-flavored romantic rapper like Heavy D".

== Track listing ==
No.	Title	Writer(s)	Producer(s)	Length
1.	"Funky Westside" (featuring Kenyatta)	Anthony Terrell Smith; Michael Ross; Matt Dike; Frederick Hibbert	Michael Ross; Matt Dike	4:50
2.	"Pimp Without a Caddy"	Smith; Ross; Mark Walker	Michael Ross; M. Walk (co.); William Michael Tate (co.)	5:09
3.	"I Adore You"	Smith; Anthony Wheaton	Tone Loc; Sir Jinx	4:22
4.	"All Through the Night" (featuring El DeBarge)	Smith; Anthony Joseph; Eric Johnson	Tone Loc; Tony Joseph; Quicksilver	4:55
5.	"Fatal Attraction"	Smith; Ross; Dike; Greg Ridley; James Itzler; Jerry Shirley; Steve Marriott	Michael Ross; Matt Dike	4:03
6.	"I Joke but I Don't Play"	Smith; Ross; Dike; Frederick White; Orlando Aguillen	Michael Ross; Matt Dike	4:26
7.	"Freaky Behavior" (featuring Kenyatta)	Smith; Dike; Alphonso Mizell; Itzler; Larry Mizell	Michael Ross; Matt Dike	4:40
8.	"Mean Green" (featuring Def Jef)	Smith; Jeffrey Fortson; George Duke; Byron Miller; Charles Foster Johnson; Leon Chancler	Tone Loc; Def Jef	5:24
9.	"Why"	Smith; Joseph; Johnson	Tony Joseph; Quicksilver	4:58
10.	"Hip-Hop It Is Kinda Different" (featuring MC Wink Dog)	Smith; Anthony Atkinson; Joseph; Johnson	Tone Loc; Tony Joseph; Quicksilver	5:00
11.	"Funky Westside Reprise" (featuring Kenyatta)	Smith; Ross; Dike	Michael Ross; Matt Dike	2:30

== Charts ==
Chart (1992)	Peak position
Australian Albums (ARIA)	129
Austrian Albums (Ö3 Austria)	39
US Top R&B/Hip-Hop Albums (Billboard)	46
