= And in This Corner... =

And in This Corner…

Studio album by DJ Jazzy Jeff & the Fresh Prince
- Released: October 31, 1989
- Genre: Hip-hop
- Length: 56:40
- Label: Jive; RCA
- Producer: DJ Jazzy Jeff; The Fresh Prince

DJ Jazzy Jeff & the Fresh Prince chronology
He's the DJ, I'm the Rapper (1988)	And in This Corner… (1989)	Homebase (1991)

Singles from And in This Corner...
- 1. "I Think I Can Beat Mike Tyson" Released: 1989; 2. "Jazzy's Groove" Released: 1989

Professional ratings
Review scores
Source	Rating
AllMusic	3/5 stars
Robert Christgau	B+
Q	3/5 stars

And in This Corner… is the third studio album released by MC/DJ duo DJ Jazzy Jeff & the Fresh Prince. The album was released in October 1989, reaching no. 39 on the US Billboard 200 albums chart. The album was not released on Compact Disc in the UK. However, it was available on this format in most of Europe.

For the album, the duo took influence from jazz and funk alongside their typical repertoire. They utilized trumpets, saxes, and flutes. Lyrical concepts are fully developed, and set between the comical and crowd concepts. Smith said later that most of the recording time was spent partying in the Bahamas rather than working, and that the record suffered for their lack of discipline. Upon its release, the album was a commercial success as it sold over half a million copies, and was certified Gold by the RIAA. However, compared to the duo's previous work, the album was considered a letdown, only selling half as many copies.

Nevertheless, the album received two Grammy Awards nominations including Best Rap Performance for their first single "I Think I Can Beat Mike Tyson" in 1990 (which lost to Young MC's "Bust a Move") and Best Rap Performance by a Duo or Group for the album itself in 1991 (which lost to Quincy Jones, Big Daddy Kane, Ice-T, Kool Moe Dee, Melle Mel & Quincy Jones III's "Back on the Block").

== Track listing ==
1. "Then She Bit Me" (Will Smith, Jeffrey Townes, Pete Q. Harris) – 3:35
2. "I Think I Can Beat Mike Tyson" (Smith, Townes, Harris) – 4:49
3. "Jazzy's Groove" (Smith, Townes) – 3:43
4. "Everything That Glitters (Ain't Always Gold)" (Smith, Townes, Harris) – 4:17
5. "You Got It (Donut)" (Smith, Townes, Harris) – 4:56
6. "The Girlie Had a Mustache" (Smith, Townes) – 4:32
7. "The Reverend" (Smith, Townes) – 4:31
8. "Who Stole My Car?" (Smith, Townes, Harris) – 4:57
9. "The Men of Your Dreams" (Smith, Townes, Harris) – 4:52
10. "Numero Uno" (Smith, Townes) – 4:08
11. "Too Damn Hype" (Smith, Townes) – 5:41
12. "Jeff Waz on the Beat Box" (Smith, Townes) – 5:42

== Samples ==
Jazzy's Groove

- "The Champ" by the Mohawks
- "Funky Drummer" by James Brown
- "Synthetic Substitution" by Melvin Bliss
- "Nautilus" by Bob James
- "Saturday Night Style" by Mikey Dread
- "Eric B. Is President" by Eric B. & Rakim
- "Bring the Noise" by Public Enemy

Jeff Waz on the Beatbox

- "Put the Music Where Your Mouth Is" by the Olympic Runners
- "Sing Sing" by Gaz
- "You'll Like It Too" by Funkadelic

The Girlie Had a Mustache

- "Escape-Ism" by James Brown
- "Think (About It)" by Lyn Collins
- "You Can Have Watergate Just Gimme Some Bucks and I'll Be Straight" by Fred Wesley and the J.B.'s
- "Bounce, Rock, Skate, Roll" by Vaughan Mason and Crew

The Reverend

- "Dance to the Music" by Sly & the Family Stone
- "Good Times" by Chic

Too Damn Hype

- "The Big Beat" by Billy Squier
- "Here We Go (Live at the Funhouse)" by Run-DMC

Who Stole My Car?

- "The Grunt" by the J.B.'s
- "Funky President" by James Brown

You Got It (Donut)

- "I Know You Got Soul" by Bobby Byrd
- "Eric B. Is President" by Eric B. & Rakim

Numero Uno

- "Public Enemy No. 1" by Public Enemy

The Men of Your Dreams

- "Change the Beat (Female Version)" by Fab 5 Freddy feat. Beeside

== Charts ==
=== Chart positions ===
Chart (1989–1990)	Peak position
Australia (ARIA)	77
Canadian Albums Chart	19
U.S. Billboard 200	39
U.S. Top R&B/Hip-Hop Albums (Billboard)	19

== Certifications ==
Region	Certification	Certified units/sales
Canada (Music Canada)	Gold	50,000^{^}
United States (RIAA)	Gold	500,000^{^}
^{^} Shipments figures based on certification alone.
