= Principal's Office (song) =

Single by Young MC

from the album Stone Cold Rhymin'
- Released: November 1989
- Recorded: 1989
- Genre: Hip hop; funk
- Length: 4:15
- Songwriters: Young MC, Matt Dike, Michael Ross

Young MC singles chronology
"Bust a Move" (1989)	"Principal's Office" (1989)	"I Come Off" (1990)

"Principal's Office" is a 1989 single by Young M.C. It is the follow-up single to his international hit, "Bust a Move". The music video for the song was nominated for Best Rap Video at the 1990 MTV Video Music Awards.

== Charts ==
=== Weekly charts ===
Chart (1989–1990)	Peak position
Australia (ARIA)	50
Netherlands (Dutch Top 40 Tipparade)	8
Netherlands (Single Top 100)	43
New Zealand (Recorded Music NZ)	5
UK Singles (Official Charts)	54
US Billboard Hot 100	33
US Hot Dance Music/Maxi-Singles Sales (Billboard)	47
US Hot R&B Singles (Billboard)	51
US Hot Rap Singles (Billboard)	9

=== Year-end charts ===
Chart (1990)	Position
New Zealand (Recorded Music NZ)	39
