= Yona Marie =

US singer, songwriter, composer and music blogger

Yona Marie (born Rachel Marie) is a Maryland-born singer, songwriter, composer and music blogger based mainly in Washington, DC. Her style is mostly in the rap and R&B genres of pop music, although she has also dabbled in more eclectic styles such as neosoul and gospel music. Marie is best known for her R&B hit single "I'm Still Loyal", which featured positive reviews from critics, as well as for her popular music guidance blog Yona Marie Music, where Marie gives career advice, critical reviews of older popular music, and anecdotes about her own experiences in the music industry.

== Early life ==
Yona Marie was born in the state of Maryland and grew up with her family in various parts of Washington, DC, where she regularly sang First Rising Mount Zion Baptist Church, and in performing arts schools for minor children including Hyattsville Middle School and Suitland High School. She attended Jacksonville University.

== Career ==
Yona Marie found moderate success in the early 2010s with the releases of her singles "The Luv Exposure" (a lead single featured on a Majormix release alongside works by Chris Brown, Ace Hood, and Tyga), "High" and "Just Wanna Love You". These were all released under her birth name Rachel Marie. In 2018, Marie changed her name to Yona Marie in an attempt to better disambiguate herself as an artist with a less common moniker. Marie claimed to have taken this name from a manga called Yona of The Dawn that she had liked reading. Most of Marie's other work included creating commercial jingles for clients and offering marketing services for clients.

Marie found more prominent popularity in the release of her 2021 single "I'm Still Loyal", which coincided with a lesser-known single she had released that year, "Take Me to the Moon". "I'm Still Loyal" was praised by The Sound Cafe for "a relatable narrative, ear-pleasing vocals, and tuneful melodies... the likeable tune possesses hip-hop-inspired instrumentation flavoured with contemporary R&B vibration". It was also praised by The Women's International Music Network. Zangba Thomson of Bong said of the single, "we recommend adding Yona Marie’s "I’m Still Loyal" single to your favorite contemporary R&B playlist."

== Yona Marie Music ==
Yona Marie Music is Yona Marie's professional platform, which initially started as a website for connecting with prospective clients, but later also developed into a music blog. Marie shared critical reviews of various older popular music such as "Funky Cold Medina", and also gave music advice through the blog. Marie's digital presence on Yona Marie Music was enhanced during the height of the COVID-19 pandemic, when Marie got stuck on a cruise ship forcing the ship off-course from its usual commercial vacation routine via Royal Caribbean.
