= Return of the 1 Hit Wonder =

Studio album by Young MC
- Released: July 22, 1997
- Recorded: 1997
- Genre: Hip hop; funk; R&B
- Label: Overall Records
- Producer: Young MC; Eric Adger; Ted Perlman

Young MC chronology
What's the Flavor? (1993)	Return of the 1 Hit Wonder (1997)	Ain't Goin' Out Like That (2000)

Professional ratings
Review scores
Source	Rating
AllMusic	2.5/5 stars
The Source	1/5 stars

Return of the 1 Hit Wonder is the fourth album by rapper, Young MC. The album was released in 1997 for Overall Records and was Young MC's first release on an independent record label. While the album did not chart on any album charts, it did have two charting singles; "Madame Buttafly" reached No. 25 on the Hot Rap Songs and "On & Poppin" reached No. 23. The title refers to Young MC's only Billboard Hot 100 top 10 hit, "Bust A Move".

== Track listing ==
1. "One Hit"
2. "Freakie"
3. "On & Poppin'"
4. "You Ain't Gotta Lie Ta Kick It"
5. "Madame Buttafly"
6. "Lingerie"
7. "Coast 2 Coast"
8. "Fuel to the Fire"
9. "Bring It Home"
10. "Intensify"
11. "Mr. Right Now"
12. "On & Poppin'" (Remix)
