= I Got It Goin' On =

Single by Tone Lōc

from the album Lōc-ed After Dark
- Released: 1989
- Recorded: 1988
- Genre: Hip hop
- Length: 4:32
- Label: Delicious Vinyl
- Songwriters: Tone Lōc, Matt Dike
- Producers: Matt Dike, T. Smith

Tone Lōc singles chronology
"Funky Cold Medina" (1989)	"I Got It Goin' On" (1989)	"All Through the Night" (1991)

"I Got It Goin' On" is the third and final single from Tone Loc's 1989 album Lōc-ed After Dark. While not as successful as the earlier singles "Wild Thing" and "Funky Cold Medina", it reached number 18 on the US Hot Rap Singles chart and number 59 on the Top R&B Singles chart in the summer of 1989. It eventually sold over 600,000 singles (gold).

== Track listings ==
Vinyl

1. "I Got It Goin' On" (remix) – 4:22
2. "I Got It Goin' On" (Go Go instrumental) – 4:36
3. "The Homies" (album version) – 4:03
4. "The Homies" (On Tilt mix) – 2:20
5. "The Fine Line Between Hyper and Stupid" featuring Akeem, Aleem & Hashim – 4:00

CD

1. "I Got It Goin' On" (remix edit) – 3:47
2. "The Homies" – 2:20
3. "The Fine Line Between Hyper and Stupid" featuring Akeem, Aleem & Hashim – 4:00
4. "Cheeba Cheeba" – 6:10
