= List of Billboard 200 number-one albums of 1989 =

The highest-selling albums and EPs in the United States are ranked in the Billboard 200, which is published by Billboard magazine. The data are compiled by Nielsen Soundscan based on each album's weekly physical and digital sales. In 1989, 15 albums advanced to the peak position of the chart.

Bobby Brown's Don't Be Cruel was the best performing and best-selling album of 1989, spending 6 non-consecutive weeks at number one.

The Raw & the Cooked, the second album by rock and soul band Fine Young Cannibals, had the longest run among the releases that reached peak position in 1989, spending 7 consecutive weeks in the top position.

The 1989 debut album Girl You Know It's True, by the pop group Milli Vanilli, spent 7 non-consecutive weeks in the top position, with 6 of those weeks in 1989.

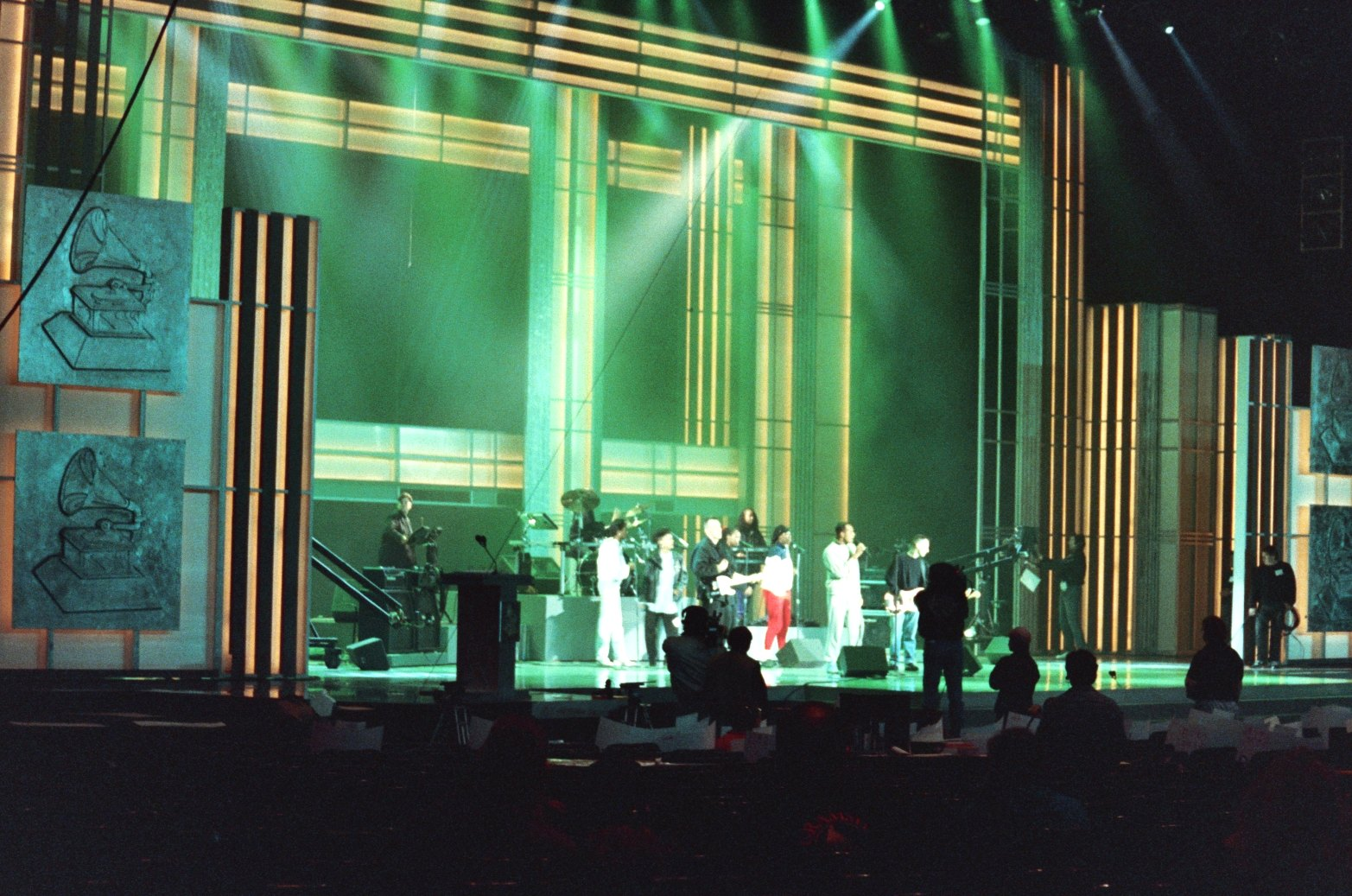
The Raw & the Cooked by Fine Young Cannibals spent seven consecutive weeks at number one in 1989.

== Chart history ==
Key
†	Indicates best performing album of 1989

Issue date	Album	Artist(s)	Label(s)	Ref.
January 7	Giving You the Best That I Got	Anita Baker	Elektra	
January 14	Giving You the Best That I Got	Anita Baker	Elektra	
January 21	Don't Be Cruel †	Bobby Brown	MCA	
January 28	Don't Be Cruel †	Bobby Brown	MCA	
February 4	Don't Be Cruel †	Bobby Brown	MCA	
February 11	Appetite for Destruction	Guns N' Roses	Geffen	
February 18	Don't Be Cruel †	Bobby Brown	MCA	
February 25	Don't Be Cruel †	Bobby Brown	MCA	
March 4	Don't Be Cruel †	Bobby Brown	MCA	
March 11	Electric Youth	Debbie Gibson	Atlantic	
March 18	Electric Youth	Debbie Gibson	Atlantic	
March 25	Electric Youth	Debbie Gibson	Atlantic	
April 1	Electric Youth	Debbie Gibson	Atlantic	
April 8	Electric Youth	Debbie Gibson	Atlantic	
April 15	Lōc-ed After Dark	Tone Lōc	Delicious Vinyl	
April 22	Like a Prayer	Madonna	Sire/Warner Bros.	
April 29	Like a Prayer	Madonna	Sire/Warner Bros.	
May 6	Like a Prayer	Madonna	Sire/Warner Bros.	
May 13	Like a Prayer	Madonna	Sire/Warner Bros.	
May 20	Like a Prayer	Madonna	Sire/Warner Bros.	
May 27	Like a Prayer	Madonna	Sire/Warner Bros.	
June 3	The Raw & the Cooked	Fine Young Cannibals	I.R.S.	
June 10	The Raw & the Cooked	Fine Young Cannibals	I.R.S.	
June 17	The Raw & the Cooked	Fine Young Cannibals	I.R.S.	
June 24	The Raw & the Cooked	Fine Young Cannibals	I.R.S.	
July 1	The Raw & the Cooked	Fine Young Cannibals	I.R.S.	
July 8	The Raw & the Cooked	Fine Young Cannibals	I.R.S.	
July 15	The Raw & the Cooked	Fine Young Cannibals	I.R.S.	
July 22	Batman	Prince / Soundtrack	Warner Bros.	
July 29	Batman	Prince / Soundtrack	Warner Bros.	
August 5	Batman	Prince / Soundtrack	Warner Bros.	
August 12	Batman	Prince / Soundtrack	Warner Bros.	
August 19	Batman	Prince / Soundtrack	Warner Bros.	
August 26	Batman	Prince / Soundtrack	Warner Bros.	
September 2	Repeat Offender	Richard Marx	Capitol	
September 9	Hangin' Tough	New Kids on the Block	Columbia	
September 16	Hangin' Tough	New Kids on the Block	Columbia	
September 23	Girl You Know It's True	Milli Vanilli	Arista	
September 30	Girl You Know It's True	Milli Vanilli	Arista	
October 7	Forever Your Girl	Paula Abdul	Virgin	
October 14	Dr. Feelgood	Mötley Crüe	Elektra	
October 21	Dr. Feelgood	Mötley Crüe	Elektra	
October 28	Janet Jackson's Rhythm Nation 1814	Janet Jackson	A&M	
November 4	Janet Jackson's Rhythm Nation 1814	Janet Jackson	A&M	
November 11	Janet Jackson's Rhythm Nation 1814	Janet Jackson	A&M	
November 18	Janet Jackson's Rhythm Nation 1814	Janet Jackson	A&M	
November 25	Girl You Know It's True	Milli Vanilli	Arista	
December 2	Girl You Know It's True	Milli Vanilli	Arista	
December 9	Girl You Know It's True	Milli Vanilli	Arista	
December 16	Storm Front	Billy Joel	Columbia	
December 23	Girl You Know It's True	Milli Vanilli	Arista	
December 30	...But Seriously	Phil Collins	Virgin/Atlantic	

== See also ==
- 1989 in music
