= Brainstorm (album) =

Studio album by Young MC
- Released: August 5, 1991
- Recorded: 1991
- Genre: Hip hop; funk
- Length: 63:20
- Label: Capitol
- Producer: Young MC; G Love E

Young MC chronology
Stone Cold Rhymin' (1989)	Brainstorm (1991)	What's the Flavor? (1993)

Singles from Brainstorm
- 1. "That's the Way Love Goes" Released: July 30, 1991; 2. "Keep It in Your Pants" Released: September 24, 1991

Professional ratings
Review scores
Source	Rating
AllMusic	3/5 stars
Entertainment Weekly	C−
The Rolling Stone Album Guide	2.5/5 stars

Brainstorm is the second album by the American rapper Young MC. It was released on August 5, 1991, via Capitol Records. The album was produced by Young MC, except for "The Right One", produced by G Love E. The album peaked at number 66 on the Billboard 200 and number 61 on the Top R&B/Hip-Hop Albums chart in the United States, and number 42 in New Zealand Albums Charts. It was certified Gold by the Recording Industry Association of America on October 9, 1991, for sales of over 500,000 copies. Its lead single "That's the Way Love Goes" peaked at No. 54 on the Billboard Hot 100, No. 32 on the Hot R&B/Hip-Hop Songs, No. 23 in New Zealand and No. 65 in the UK Singles Chart. A follow-up single, "Keep It in Your Pants", made it to No. 67 on the Hot R&B/Hip-Hop Songs and No. 18 in New Zealand.

== Track listing ==
No.	Title	Length
1.	"That's the Way Love Goes"	3:49
2.	"Keep Your Eyes on the Prize"	4:53
3.	"Do You Feel Like I Do"	4:05
4.	"After School"	5:11
5.	"The Right One"	4:36
6.	"The Um Dee Dum Song"	2:26
7.	"Album Filler"	3:17
8.	"Keep It in Your Pants"	4:57
9.	"Use Your Head"	5:04
10.	"Listen to the Beat of the Music"	4:55
11.	"Inside My Head"	7:05
12.	"Life in the Fast Lane"	7:49
13.	"That's the Way Love Goes (Broken Heart Remix)"	5:20
Total length:		1:03:20

== Personnel ==
- Marvin "Young M.C." Young – vocals, arranger & producer (tracks: 1–4, 6–13)
- Myra Cormier – backing vocals (track 1)
- Paul Milton Jackson Jr. – guitar (tracks: 1, 3, 12)
- Vail Johnson – bass (tracks: 1, 3)
- Stephanie Pinkard – backing vocals (track 3)
- Alphonse Mouzon – drums (track 10)
- Mike Bordin – drums (track 11)
- Lawrence "G Love E" Edwards – producer (track 5)
- Steve Dady – recording (track 1)
- Paul McKenna – recording (tracks: 2–13), mixing
- Herb Powers Jr. – mastering

== Charts ==
Chart performance for Brainstorm
Chart (1991)	Peak position
New Zealand Albums (RMNZ)	42
US Billboard 200	66

== Certifications ==
Region	Certification	Certified units/sales
United States (RIAA)	Gold	500,000^{^}
^{^} Shipments figures based on certification alone.
