= Ain't Goin' Out Like That =

Studio album by Young MC
- Released: October 24, 2000
- Recorded: 2000
- Genre: Hip hop; pop rap; funk
- Label: Young Man
- Producer: Young MC; Eric Adger; Ted Perlman

Young MC chronology
Return of the 1 Hit Wonder (1997)	Ain't Goin' Out Like That (2000)	Engage the Enzyme (2002)

Professional ratings
Review scores
Source	Rating
AllMusic	3/5 stars

Ain't Goin' Out Like That is the fifth album by rapper, Young MC. The album was released in 2000 for Young MC's own record label, Young Man Moving Records. This album marked Young MC's return to the charts, reaching No. 85 on the US Top R&B/Hip-Hop Albums chart. It featured the single "Ain't Goin' Out Like That" and also featured a remix of his only top 10 hit "Bust a Move".

== Track listing ==
1. "What It Look Like" – 4:12
2. "Ain't Goin' Out Like That" – 3:44
3. "Oh!" – 4:51
4. "Way of the World" – 4:05
5. "That's Right" – 5:02
6. "After Dark" – 4:00
7. "Y'all Don't Hear Me Doe" – 4:41
8. "Where's the Party At?" – 3:26
9. "Dreamer" – 5:21
10. "Ain't Goin' Out Like That" (Smooth and Scratchy Remix) – 4:25
11. "Bust a Move" (The Y2K Remix) – 6:56
