= C Bear and Jamal =

German-American animated series

- Genre: Children's; Animation; Comedy; Musical
- Created by: Tone Lōc; Earl Richey Jones; Todd R. Jones
- Voices of: Arthur Reggie III; Tone Lōc; George L. Wallace; Dawnn Lewis; Darryl Sivad; Aries Spears; Jeannie Elias; Margaret Cho; Paul Rodríguez
- Narrated by: Tone Lōc
- Theme music composer: Tone Lōc; Kurt Farquhar
- Opening theme: "C Bear and Jamal"
- Ending theme: "C Bear and Jamal" (instrumental)
- Composer: Kurt Farquhar
- Countries of origin: United States; Germany
- Original language: English
- No. of seasons: 2
- No. of episodes: 13

Production
- Executive producers: Tone Lōc; Earl Richey Jones; Todd R. Jones; Phil Roman; Margaret Loesch
- Producer: Swinton O. Scott III
- Running time: 25 minutes
- Production companies: Film Roman; Taurus Film GmbH & Co.

Original release
- Network: Fox Kids
- Release: February 3, 1996 – February 22, 1997

C Bear and Jamal is a musical comedy animated children's television series that originally aired on the Fox Kids programming block from 1996 to 1997. It centers on an elementary school-aged boy named Jamal and his companion "C Bear", an orange hip-hop teddy bear who raps. Film Roman co-produced the show.

== Characters ==
- Jamal Harrison Wingo (Arthur Reggie III) - Jamal is a cheerful, imaginative 9-year-old (later 10-year-old) African-American boy. He always keeps C Bear by his side.
- C Bear (Tone Loc) - C Bear is a wise rapping teddy bear with a hip-hop style. He comes to life whenever Jamal is around and is always ready to give him advice. He has the power to take Jamal on magical adventures at the snap of his finger. C Bear sometimes breaks the fourth wall with sarcastic remarks to the audience.
- Hawthorne Wingo (George L. Wallace) - Hawthorne is Jamal’s father. He sometimes wonders why Jamal still keeps C Bear. Hawthorne's wife died before the events of the series.
- Bernice Wingo (Dawnn Lewis) - Bernice is Jamal's grandmother. She is kind hearted and gentle, and is most often seen cooking meals for her family.
- Willis Wingo (Darryl Sivad) - Willis is Jamal's grandfather and the husband of Bernice. He is bald and rarely leaves his chair by the television.
- Maya (Kim Fields) - Maya is Jamal’s classmate and love interest. She is bold and outspoken, and has a loud voice. She is the smartest of Jamal’s friends, often getting the highest test scores in class.
- Big Chill (Aries Spears) - Big Chill is Jamal’s fat friend, who is always hungry and speaks like he has a cold. Upon entering a room, he'll say "the b-i-g c-h-i-double-l is in the hizzouse". Big Chill has been held back in school a few times. Though his exact age is unknown, he is old enough to drive a car and, in one episode, mentions filling out tax forms.
- Kwame (Aries Spears) Kwame is Jamal's best friend. He is dressed in African clothes and believes in "power to the people". He has a tendency to label anything and everything as a "conspiracy by 'The Man'”. He is the second smartest of Jamal’s friends.
- Chipster (Jeannie Elias) - Chipster is Jamal's Caucasian friend. He is silly and likes to make his friends laugh.
- Kim (Margaret Cho) - Kim is Jamal's Asian friend and Maya’s best friend. She is feisty and quick to stand up to anyone who bullies her friends.
- Javier (Paul Rodríguez) - Javier is Jamal's Latino friend. He has a wide vocabulary, often using big words that Jamal and his friends barely understand. He is the third smartest in class, achieving the second highest grades after Maya.
- Miss Fine - Miss Fine is Jamal’s teacher. She is kind but firm, always pushing her students to do their best.
- Sooner - Sooner is the Wingos’ basset hound and C Bear’s rival. Sooner and C Bear often engage in cartoonish chases and fights, which are usually won by C Bear.

== Episodes ==
=== Series overview ===
Season	Episodes	Originally released	
Season	Episodes	First released	Last released
1	3	February 3, 1996	February 17, 1996
2	10	September 21, 1996	February 22, 1997

=== Season 1 (1996) ===
No. overall	No. in season	Title	Original release date	Prod. code
1	1	"Rap Van Winkle"	February 3, 1996	102
C-Bear takes Jamal into the future to show him the sad effects of sleeping through his education. Song featured: "The Rap Song"
2	2	"Emperor's New Gear"	February 10, 1996	101
C-Bear introduces Jamal to the "Duke" in an effort to convince Jamal that the clothes he wears don't matter. It's the person he is that counts. Song featured: "New Clothes"
3	3	"Big"	February 17, 1996	103
On his 10th birthday, Jamal decides act like more of a grown-up starting with leaving C-Bear at home. Song featured: "Jamal's Blues"

=== Season 2 (1996–97) ===
No. overall	No. in season	Title	Original release date	Prod. code
4	1	"Teeing Off"	September 21, 1996	104
Unable to make any other school sports team, Jamal tries out for the Golf Team, coached along by C-Bear and by Big Chill who, surprisingly, is something of a golf prodigy. Jamal fails to make the team, but learns that he has prowess in other important areas. Song featured: "Ode to Duckie Jordan"
5	2	"The Prince and the Po' Boy"	September 28, 1996	105
Jamal becomes embarrassed about being middle class when he meets a rich cousin and begins to act more upper crust. He begins a charade of wealth and high manners, which almost alienates his friends. Jamal learns to appreciate the things money can't buy - family, friends, and love. Song featured: "If I Were A Rich Boy"
6	3	"Raging Bully"	October 12, 1996	106
When Jamal is teased by a school yard bully, he tries everything from avoidance to a near physical confrontation. C-Bear teaches Jamal that words can often hurt more than fists, and that bullies are usually people in need of understanding and friendship. Song featured: "Little Red Ragamuffin"
7	4	"Hanging With Mr. Wingo"	November 2, 1996	107
Jamal loses respect for his father when he discovers his father's job isn’t as exciting as he once believed. Song featured: "No Worry Free J.O.B"
8	5	"Big Head Jamal"	November 9, 1996	108
Jamal is cast in a commercial and adopts an obnoxious attitude when he begins to dream of a glamorous Hollywood life. When Jamal is fired from the commercial, he is humbled and must apologize to his friends. Song featured: "Benocchio's Lament"
9	6	"Sleepless in South Central"	November 16, 1996	110
Jamal becomes jealous when his father goes out on a date, and tries to tag along to ruin the experience. C-Bear joins in, until he realizes they're wrong. He shows Jamal the value of space in any relationship, and that his father's dating doesn't diminish the memory of Jamal's deceased mother. Song featured: "Ain't Got No Life"
10	7	"Dumbing Down"	November 23, 1996	112
Jamal convinces Maya to act dumb and lower her test scores before she loses all her friends, who don't get grades as good as hers. C-Bear convinces Jamal it's wrong to make Maya reduce her intelligence in order to please others Song featured: "The Thinker"
11	8	"The Truth and Nothing But the Truth"	February 1, 1997	113
Jamal lies in order to get a job on the school newspaper as an advice columnist. When he can no longer lie, he begins telling too much truth, even at home. After learning how much the truth can hurt, Jamal apologizes to the people he insulted. Song featured: "Jamal Can't Handle The Truth"
12	9	"Puppy Love"	February 15, 1997	111
Jamal wants to ask a girl to the Spring dance and fumbles through various ways to do it. Song featured: "Here Comes Jamal"
13	10	"Most Valuable Grandpa"	February 22, 1997	109
Jamal gains a new respect for his grandfather when he has to replace Jamal’s father at the Parent/Student Picnic. Song featured: "Tortoise And The Hare"

== Home video releases ==
Xenon Entertainment Group released every episode of the show on VHS and DVD in 2000.

As of January 2022, C Bear and Jamal can be streamed on The Roku Channel.

All C Bear and Jamal episodes can now be streamed on YouTube.
