= Stone Cold Rhymin' =

Studio album by Young MC
- Released: September 5, 1989
- Recorded: 1988−89
- Studio: Matt Dike's apartment (Santa Monica, California)
- Genres: Hip-hop; funk
- Length: 47:24
- Label: Delicious Vinyl
- Producers: Matt Dike; Michael Ross; Quincy Jones; Dust Brothers

Young MC chronology
Stone Cold Rhymin' (1989)	Brainstorm (1991)

Singles from Stone Cold Rhymin'
- 1. "I Let 'Em Know" Released: 1988; 2. "Know How" Released: 1988; 3. "Bust a Move" Released: May 22, 1989; 4. "Principal's Office" Released: 1989; 5. "I Come Off" Released: 1990; 6. "Pick Up the Pace" Released: 1990

Stone Cold Rhymin' is the debut album by the American rapper Young MC. It was released in 1989 on Delicious Vinyl and was later re-issued by Rhino Records. The album reached No. 9 on the Billboard Top Pop Albums chart. The third track, "Bust a Move", was Young MC's biggest hit and is his best-known song, reaching No. 7 on the Billboard Hot 100 and topping the charts in Australia. His follow-up single, "Principal's Office", reached No. 33 on the Billboard Hot 100 and was also nominated for "Best Rap Video" at the 1990 MTV Video Music Awards.

== Critical reception ==
Professional ratings
Review scores
Source	Rating
AllMusic	5/5 stars
Chicago Tribune	3/4 stars
Los Angeles Times	3/5 stars
NME	7/10
Q	4/5 stars
RapReviews	6.5/10
Record Mirror	4/5
The Rolling Stone Album Guide	3.5/5 stars
Tiny Mix Tapes	3.5/5
The Village Voice	B+

The Calgary Herald noted that Young MC possesses "perhaps the clearest enunciation in rap: every word comes through perfectly, and yet his delivery is more musical than most."

== Track listing ==
All tracks composed by Marvin Young, Matt Dike, and Michael Ross except where otherwise noted. All tracks published by PolyGram Music except "Just Say No" published by PolyGram/Warner Chappell.

1. "I Come Off" (feat. N'Dea Davenport)
2. "Principal's Office"
3. "Bust a Move"
4. "Non Stop"
5. "Fastest Rhyme" (M. Young)
6. "My Name Is Young" (M. Young/M. Dike) (Note: There are two versions of "My Name Is Young". The lyrics are the same but the music is distinct.)
7. "Know How" (M. Young/John "King Gizmo" King/Michael "E.Z. Mike" Simpson)
8. "Roll with the Punches"
9. "I Let 'Em Know"
10. "Pick Up the Pace" (M. Young/M. Dike)
11. "Got More Rhymes" (M. Young/M. Dike/M. Ross/J. King)
12. "Stone Cold Buggin'" (M. Young/M. Dike)
13. "Just Say No" (M. Young/Quincy Jones Jr.)

== Personnel ==
- Young MC – vocals, songwriting
- Matt Dike – production, arrangement, mixing (all tracks except 7 and 13)
- Michael Ross – production, arrangement, mixing (all tracks except 7 and 13)
- The Dust Brothers – production, arrangement, mixing (track 7), co-production (track 11)
- Quincy Jones Jr. – production, arrangement, mixing (track 13)
- Mario Caldato Jr. – engineering
- Brian Foxworthy – additional engineering
- Salomon – photography, art direction
- EMC-0 – production coordinator
- Crystal Blake – vocals (tracks 1, 3 and 11)
- Flea – bass (tracks 2 and 3)
- Kevin O'Neal – bass (tracks 7 and 8)
- John Dexter Steward Jr. – drums (tracks 2 and 4)

== Charts ==
=== Weekly charts ===
Weekly chart performance for Stone Cold Rhymin'
Chart (1989–90)	Peak position
Australian Albums (ARIA)	38
Canada Top Albums/CDs (RPM)	8
New Zealand Albums (RMNZ)	7
US Billboard 200	9
US Top R&B/Hip-Hop Albums (Billboard)	8

=== Year-end charts ===
Year-end chart performance for Stone Cold Rhymin'
Chart (1989)	Position
Canada Top Albums/CDs (RPM)	54
Chart (1990)	Position
US Billboard 200	25

== Certifications ==
Certifications for Stone Cold Rhymin'
Region	Certification	Certified units/sales
Canada (Music Canada)	Platinum	100,000^{^}
United States (RIAA)	Platinum	1,000,000^{^}
^{^} Shipments figures based on certification alone.
