= What's the Flavor? =

Studio album by Young MC
- Released: 1993
- Genres: Hip hop; funk
- Label: Capitol
- Producers: Ali Shaheed Muhammad, Young MC, Beetle

Young MC chronology
Brainstorm (1991)	What's the Flavor? (1993)	Return of the 1 Hit Wonder (1997)

What's the Flavor? is the third studio album by the American rapper Young MC, released in 1993 via Capitol Records. It was his final studio album for a major record label.

== Production ==
The album was produced by Ali Shaheed Muhammad, Young MC, and Beetle.

== Critical reception ==
Professional ratings
Review scores
Source	Rating
AllMusic	3/5 stars
Entertainment Weekly	B−
The Indianapolis Star	2/4 stars

Entertainment Weekly concluded that "Young strings the words together nimbly enough, but they never come to life." USA Today noted that "the album ranges in style from [A Tribe Called] Quest's hard-core sound to soft pop, cool jazz and dancehall reggae." The Indianapolis Star determined that Young's "personality was formed by TV commercials, which can make for some fun, but his pointlessness dominates an otherwise energetic dose of hip-hop, jazz and funk."

AllMusic deemed the album "agreeable and likeable, with only a couple of embarrassing tracks."

== Track listing ==
1. "We Can Do This"
2. "Love You Slow"
3. "What's the Flavor?"
4. "Foulin'"
5. "Bob Your Head"
6. "I'll Go"
7. "Love You Slow" (Beach Mix Interlude)
8. "Don't Sleep"
9. "Open Up the Door (and Let Me In)"
10. "Back in the Day"
11. "Ease Back"
12. "Just Like That"
13. "Bob Your Head" (Reprise Interlude)
14. "What's the Flavor?" (Mo Flava Mix)
