= Engage the Enzyme =

Studio album by Young MC
- Released: August 6, 2002
- Recorded: 2002
- Genre: Hip hop; pop rap; funk
- Length: 29:46
- Label: Stimulus
- Producer: Young MC; Eric Adger

Young MC chronology
Ain't Goin' Out Like That (2000)	Engage the Enzyme (2002)	Adrenaline Flow (2007)

Professional ratings
Review scores
Source	Rating
AllMusic	3/5 stars

Engage the Enzyme is the sixth studio album by rapper Young MC, released in 2002 by Stimulus Records. The album did not make it to the album charts. It features the single, "Heatseeker".

== Track listing ==
1. "Intro" – 1:10
2. "Stress Test" – 5:36
3. "Feel the Love" – 3:45
4. "Heatseeker" – 4:03
5. "Whop de Whoop" – 4:34
6. "Flows" – 5:14
7. "Unsigned Diva" – 4:34
8. "Babe" – 6:03
9. "Crucial" – 6:41
10. "One Time for Your Mind" – 4:39
11. "Ain't No Way in the World" – 4:22
12. "In Case" – 4:22
13. "Without Doubt" – 4:26
14. "Easier" – 5:37
15. "Heatseeker" (remix) – 4:29
16. "Feel the Love" (remix) – 4:12
