= Loc-ed After Dark =

Lōc-ed After Dark

Studio album by Tone Lōc
- Released: January 23, 1989
- Recorded: 1988
- Studios: Delicious Vinyl (Hollywood, California)
- Genres: Hip hop, golden age hip hop
- Length: 51:12
- Label: Delicious Vinyl
- Producers: Matt Dike; Michael Ross; the Dust Brothers

Tone Lōc chronology
Lōc-ed After Dark (1989)	Cool Hand Lōc (1991)

Singles from Lōc-ed After Dark
- 1. "Wild Thing" Released: October 1988; 2. "Funky Cold Medina" Released: 1989; 3. "I Got It Goin' On" Released: 1989

Lōc-ed After Dark is the debut studio album by American rapper Tone Lōc. It was released on January 23, 1989, via Delicious Vinyl. The album was produced by Matt Dike, Michael Ross, and the Dust Brothers. It reached the number-one spot on the Billboard 200 chart and was certified double platinum by the Recording Industry Association of America. Lōc-ed After Dark was the first album by a Black rap musician to top the chart. It featured three singles: "Wild Thing", "Funky Cold Medina", and "I Got It Goin' On".

The album's cover is based on Donald Byrd's 1963 album A New Perspective and also features the headlight of a Jaguar e-type sports car.

== Critical reception ==
Professional ratings
Review scores
Source	Rating
AllMusic	4/5 stars
Robert Christgau	B+
Los Angeles Daily News	4/4 stars
MusicHound R&B: The Essential Album Guide	3.5/5 stars
Number One	3/5 stars
RapReviews	8/10
Record Collector	4/5 stars
The Rolling Stone Album Guide	3/5 stars

The New York Times noted that the music "ranges from bare hard-core street rap to rock-rap fusion". The Washington Post wrote that "Matt Dike and Michael Ross underpin Loc's minor-league raps with a stripped-down but eclectic sound that is consistently propulsive." The Boston Globe called Lōc-ed After Dark a "party-till-you-drop debut album." The Los Angeles Daily News determined that the album "may feature the most artful sampling yet heard on record."

== Track listing ==
No.	Title	Writer(s)	Producer(s)	Length
1.	"On Fire" (Remix)	Anthony Smith; Matt Dike; Michael Ross	Dike; Ross	4:50
2.	"Wild Thing"	Smith; Marvin Young; Dike; Ross	Dike; Ross	4:23
3.	"Lōc'ed After Dark"	Smith; Dike	Dike; Ross	5:11
4.	"I Got It Goin' On"	Smith; Dike	Dike; Ross	4:32
5.	"Cutting Rhythms"	Smith; Dike; Ross; John King; Michael Simpson	The Dust Brothers	5:11
6.	"Funky Cold Medina"	Young; Dike; Ross	Dike; Ross	4:08
7.	"Next Episode"	Smith; Dike; King; Simpson	The Dust Brothers	4:01
8.	"Cheeba Cheeba" (featuring N'Dea Davenport)	Smith; Dike; Ross	Dike; Ross	6:06
9.	"Don't Get Close"	Smith; Dike; King; Simpson	The Dust Brothers	3:40
10.	"Lōc'in on the Shaw"	Dike	Dike; Ross	4:22
11.	"The Homies"	Smith; Dike; Ross	Dike; Ross	3:52
Total length:				51:12

Expanded edition (2012) bonus tracks
No.	Title	Writer(s)	Length
12.	"On Fire" (New Flavor)		5:37
13.	"Cheeba Cheeba" (Vocal)		6:06
14.	"I Got It Goin' On" (Remix)		4:14
15.	"The Homies" (On Tilt Mix)		2:19
16.	"The Fine Line Between Hyper and Stupid"	Akeem Ali; Taharga Aleem; Tunde Ra Aleem; Jerry Calliste Jr.	3:55
17.	"Wild Thing" (Wild Beats)		3:05
18.	"Funky Beats"		2:45

== Charts ==
"Funky Cold Medina"
Tone Lōc's "Funky Cold Medina" from Lōc-ed After Dark

=== Weekly charts ===
Chart (1989)	Peak position
Australian Albums (ARIA)	11
Austrian Albums (Ö3 Austria)	10
Canada Top Albums/CDs (RPM)	4
German Albums (Offizielle Top 100)	15
Dutch Albums (Album Top 100)	54
New Zealand Albums (RMNZ)	11
Swedish Albums (Sverigetopplistan)	31
Swiss Albums (Schweizer Hitparade)	30
UK Albums (Official Charts)	22
US Billboard 200	1
US Top R&B/Hip-Hop Albums (Billboard)	3

=== Year-end charts ===
Chart (1989)	Position
Canada Top Albums/CDs (RPM)	22
German Albums (Offizielle Top 100)	44
US Billboard 200	23
US Top R&B/Hip-Hop Albums (Billboard)	19

== Certifications ==
Region	Certification	Certified units/sales
Canada (Music Canada)	Platinum	100,000^{^}
United States (RIAA)	2× Platinum	2,000,000^{^}
^{^} Shipments figures based on certification alone.

== See also ==
- List of Billboard 200 number-one albums of 1989
