= I Think I Can Beat Mike Tyson =

Single by DJ Jazzy Jeff & the Fresh Prince

from the album And in This Corner…
- Released: 1989
- Recorded: 1989
- Genre: Comedy rap
- Length: 4:50
- Label: Jive/Zomba
- Songwriter(s): Smith, Townes, Harris
- Producer(s): Smith, Townes, New, Harris

DJ Jazzy Jeff & the Fresh Prince singles chronology
"A Nightmare on My Street" (1988)	"I Think I Can Beat Mike Tyson" (1989)	"Jazzy's Groove" (1990)

"I Think I Can Beat Mike Tyson" is the first single taken from DJ Jazzy Jeff & the Fresh Prince's third studio album, And in This Corner…. The song was released as a single in late 1989. This is the duo's first single to be available on Compact Disc format. It peaked at number 58 on the Billboard Hot 100.

== Music video ==
A music video (directed by Scott Kalvert) and produced by David Horgan, was released in 1989, which included guest-starring Chris Rock, and guest appearances by Mike Tyson, as well as his promoter Don King, and co-manager John Horne.

== Track listing ==
CD Single

1. "I Think I Can Beat Mike Tyson" (Radio Mix) - 3:57
2. "I Think I Can Beat Mike Tyson" (LP Version) - 4:50
3. "I Think I Can Beat Mike Tyson" (Extended Mix) - 6:34

12" Vinyl

1. "I Think I Can Beat Mike Tyson" (Radio Mix) - 3:57
2. "I Think I Can Beat Mike Tyson" (LP Version) - 4:50
3. "I Think I Can Beat Mike Tyson" (Extended Mix) - 6:34

== Charts ==
Chart (1989–1990)	Peak position
Australia (ARIA)	52
New Zealand (Recorded Music NZ)	39
UK Singles (Official Charts Company)	94
U.S. Billboard Hot 100	58
U.S. Billboard Hot Black Singles	23
