= Bust a Move (song) =

1989 single by Young MC

Single by Young MC

from the album Stone Cold Rhymin'
- B-side: "Got More Rhymes"; "The Fastest Rhyme-My Name Is Young"
- Released: May 22, 1989
- Recorded: 1989
- Genre: Hip-hop
- Length: 4:20
- Label: Delicious Vinyl; Island; 4th & B'way
- Songwriters: Marvin Young; Matt Dike; Michael Ross
- Producers: Matt Dike; Michael Ross

Young MC singles chronology
"Know How" (1988)	"Bust a Move" (1989)	"Principal's Office" (1989)

Audio
- "Bust a Move" by Young MC on YouTube

"Bust a Move" is a song by British-American rapper Young MC from his 1989 debut album, Stone Cold Rhymin'. The song is built on a sample of "Found a Child" by the group Ballin' Jack. The electronic LinnDrum sound was sampled from the song "Radio-Activity" by RoyalCash. The breakdown segment contains a combination of beats sampled from the songs "Scorpio" by Dennis Coffey and the Detroit Guitar Band, and "Daytime Hustler" by Bette Midler. "Bust a Move" also has guest vocals by Crystal Blake and bass guitar by Red Hot Chili Peppers bassist Flea, who both appear in the music video.

Released as a single on May 22, 1989, "Bust a Move" is Young MC's biggest hit, reaching number 7 on the US Billboard Hot 100 and topping the charts in Australia in 1990. The song stayed on the Billboard Hot 100 for 39 weeks, and 20 weeks in the top 40, winning the 1990 Grammy Award for Best Rap Performance. In 2008, the song was ranked number 47 on VH1's "100 Greatest Songs of Hip Hop". The single was certified Platinum in the United States by the Recording Industry Association of America (RIAA) in January 1990.

== Charts ==
=== Weekly charts ===
Chart (1989–1990)	Peak position
Australia (ARIA)	1
Belgium (Ultratop 50 Flanders)	50
Canada Retail Singles (The Record)	1
Canada Top Singles (RPM)	17
Canada Dance/Urban (RPM)	1
Netherlands (Dutch Top 40)	14
Netherlands (Single Top 100)	14
New Zealand (Recorded Music NZ)	25
UK Singles (Official Charts)	73
US Billboard Hot 100	7
US 12-inch Singles Sales (Billboard)	5
US Dance Club Play (Billboard)	7
US Hot Black Singles (Billboard)	9
US Hot Rap Singles (Billboard)	2

=== Year-end charts ===
Chart (1989)	Position
US Billboard Hot 100	42
US 12-inch Singles Sales (Billboard)	26
US Hot Black Singles (Billboard)	90
US Hot Rap Singles (Billboard)	3

Chart (1990)	Position
Australia (ARIA)	50

== Certifications ==
Region	Certification	Certified units/sales
Australia (ARIA)	Gold	35,000^{^}
Canada (Music Canada)	Gold	50,000^{^}
United States (RIAA)	Platinum	1,000,000^{^}
^{^} Shipments figures based on certification alone.

== Release history ==
Region	Date	Format(s)	Label(s)	Ref(s).
United States	May 22, 1989	7-inch vinyl; 12-inch vinyl; cassette	Delicious Vinyl; Island	
United Kingdom	July 3, 1989	7-inch vinyl; 12-inch vinyl	4th & B'way	
Japan	November 25, 1989	Mini-CD	Polystar	
Australia	July 9, 1990	7-inch vinyl; 12-inch vinyl; cassette	Delicious Vinyl; Island; 4th & B'way	

== In popular culture ==
The song is featured in the films Uncle Buck (1989), Dude, Where's My Car? (2000), See Spot Run (2001), Grind (2003), You, Me and Dupree (2006), The Blind Side and 17 Again (2009), The Perks of Being a Wallflower (2012) and It (2017). Romeo sampled the song's music and hook for his song "Big Moves" on the soundtrack of the 2001 film Max Keeble's Big Move. It also appears in the 2009 film Up in the Air, in which Young MC has a cameo performing the song.

"Bust a Move" is a playable song in the rhythm game Dance Central (2010), appears on the soundtrack of the 2016 video game Forza Horizon 3, and became an available emote in Fortnite in 2023. The song was regularly used in the television show My Name Is Earl as Randy's favorite party song. It was performed by Will Schuester in the Glee episode "Mash-Up", and was sung during karaoke in The Big Bang Theory episode "The Positive Negative Reaction". The song is featured in the Futurama episode "Bender Should Not Be Allowed on TV", the Lucifer episode "Lady Parts", and the King of the Hill episode “What Makes Bobby Run?”. In 2000, William Shatner voiced a spoken-word rendition for a Priceline commercial. In 2012, the song was used in a commercial for the candy bar Payday.
