= Wild Thing (Tone Loc song) =

1989 single by Tone Lōc

Single by Tone Lōc

from the album Lōc-ed After Dark
- B-side: "Loc'ed After Dark"
- Released: October 1988
- Genre: Rap rock
- Length: 4:23
- Label: Delicious Vinyl
- Songwriters: Marvin Young; Anthony Terrell Smith; Matt Dike; Michael Ross
- Producers: Matt Dike; Michael Ross

Tone Lōc singles chronology
"On Fire" (1987)	"Wild Thing" (1988)	"Funky Cold Medina" (1989)

Music video
- "Wild Thing" on YouTube

"Wild Thing" is a song by American rapper Tone Lōc from his first studio album, Lōc-ed After Dark. The title is a reference to the phrase "doin' the wild thing," a euphemism for sex. According to producer Mario Caldato Jr., who engineered and mixed the song, producer Michael Ross was inspired by an utterance of Fab 5 Freddy "Come on baby let's do the wild thing" in Spike Lee's She's Gotta Have It, and asked Young MC to write the lyrics.

Released as the lead single from Lōc-ed After Dark, "Wild Thing" peaked at number two on the US Billboard Hot 100 in February 1989 and reached number one in New Zealand for two weeks that April. It eventually sold over two million copies in the United States, receiving a double-platinum certification from the Recording Industry Association of America (RIAA). The song inspired at least two parodies (the Gilligan's Island-themed "Isle Thing" by "Weird Al" Yankovic, which was Yankovic's first rap parody; and "Child King" by Christian band ApologetiX).

== Sampling controversy ==
The song uses an uncredited sample of Van Halen's "Jamie's Cryin'". Van Halen's management at the time asked for a flat fee (credited in some reports to be US$50,000) as payment to have the song sampled by Tone Lōc. Apparently, the sampling decision was made without consulting the band's original members (credited as co-authors of the song). They had no idea "Wild Thing" would become a major hit. A subsequent civil lawsuit was settled out of court, with Van Halen receiving US$280,000 as settlement payment.

== Music video ==
A music video directed by Tamra Davis was made for the song at a reported cost of $500, copying the style of Robert Palmer's "Addicted to Love." Mini-skirted women play guitars next to Tone Lōc; the video was frequently shown on MTV. The leading lady in the video is played by actress Tracy Camilla Johns.

== Charts ==
=== Weekly charts ===
Chart (1989)	Peak position
Australia (ARIA)	15
Belgium (Ultratop 50 Flanders)	18
Canada Top Singles (RPM)	7
Canada Dance (RPM)	1
Europe (Eurochart Hot 100) with "Loc'ed After Dark"	26
Ireland (IRMA) with "Loc'ed After Dark"	20
Netherlands (Dutch Top 40)	3
Netherlands (Single Top 100)	4
New Zealand (Recorded Music NZ)	1
Switzerland (Schweizer Hitparade)	23
UK Singles (Official Charts) with "Loc'ed After Dark"	21
US Billboard Hot 100	2
US 12-inch Singles Sales (Billboard)	1
US Dance Club Play (Billboard)	1
US Hot Black Singles (Billboard)	3
US Hot Crossover 30 (Billboard)	1
US Hot Rap Singles (Billboard)	2
West Germany (GfK)	18

=== Year-end charts ===
Chart (1989)	Position
Australia (ARIA)	41
Canada Top Singles (RPM)	96
Canada Dance (RPM)	10
Netherlands (Dutch Top 40)	52
Netherlands (Single Top 100)	50
New Zealand (RIANZ)	3
US Billboard Hot 100	33
US 12-inch Singles Sales (Billboard)	4
US Dance Club Play (Billboard)	31
US Hot Black Singles (Billboard)	9
US Hot Rap Singles (Billboard)	26
West Germany (Media Control)	66

== Certifications ==
Region	Certification	Certified units/sales
Australia (ARIA)	Gold	35,000^{^}
Canada (Music Canada)	Gold	50,000^{^}
United States (RIAA)	2× Platinum	2,000,000^{^}
^{^} Shipments figures based on certification alone.

== Peaches remix ==
"Wild Thing (Peaches Remix)"

Single by Tone Lōc featuring Peaches
- Released: 2007
- Songwriters: Anthony Terrell Smith, Matt Dike, Marvin Young
- Producer: Peaches

Peaches singles chronology
"Boys Wanna Be Her" (2006)	"Wild Thing (Peaches Remix)" (2007)	"Talk to Me" (2009)

Music video
- "Wild Thing (Peaches remix)" on YouTube

"Wild Thing (Peaches Remix)" is a version of Tone Lōc's "Wild Thing". The song features vocals by Tone Lōc and Peaches herself. This remix was made to celebrate Delicious Vinyl's 20th anniversary. It peaked at number four on the US Billboard Dance Singles Sales chart.

=== Music video ===
The music video for "Wild Thing Remix" shows Peaches and Tone Lōc performing live at Avalon during the celebration of the 20th anniversary of Delicious Vinyl.

=== Charts ===
Chart (2008)	Peak position
US Dance Singles Sales (Billboard)	4

== Uses in popular culture ==
The song and Lōc make an appearance during a party scene in the fifth episode of Ferris Bueller (TV series).

"Wild Thing" was used in the 1989 film Uncle Buck (starring John Candy) during the scene when the titular character goes to the school of his nephew and niece to talk to the principal.

In 1991, figure skater Tonya Harding used the track of "Wild Thing" in the last third of her free skate to win the U.S. Figure Skating Championships.

In the 2000 film Bedazzled, the song is used when Brendan Fraser's character Elliot first meets the Devil, played by Liz Hurley.

In Charlie's Angels: Full Throttle (2003), the song is used to soundtrack the scene in which Cameron Diaz's character Natalie rides a mechanical bull.

In Taxi (2004), Gisele Bündchen's character Vanessa is introduced by the song walking out of a building with her female henchmen as they prepare for another bank robbery.

The song was used in the trailer for the 2004 film Garfield: The Movie.

The song is also heard, in much-edited form, in the 2016 film The Angry Birds Movie.

In 1989, the song was used in the Season One episode of the TV series Midnight Caller entitled "The Fall". Also in 1989, the song was used in the pilot episode of Doogie Howser, M.D..

The song is briefly heard at a bar in the third chapter of the 2012 video game The Darkness II.

In 2012, Bob Sinclar and Snoop Dogg made an electro house cover.
