= Young MC =

American rapper (b. 1967)

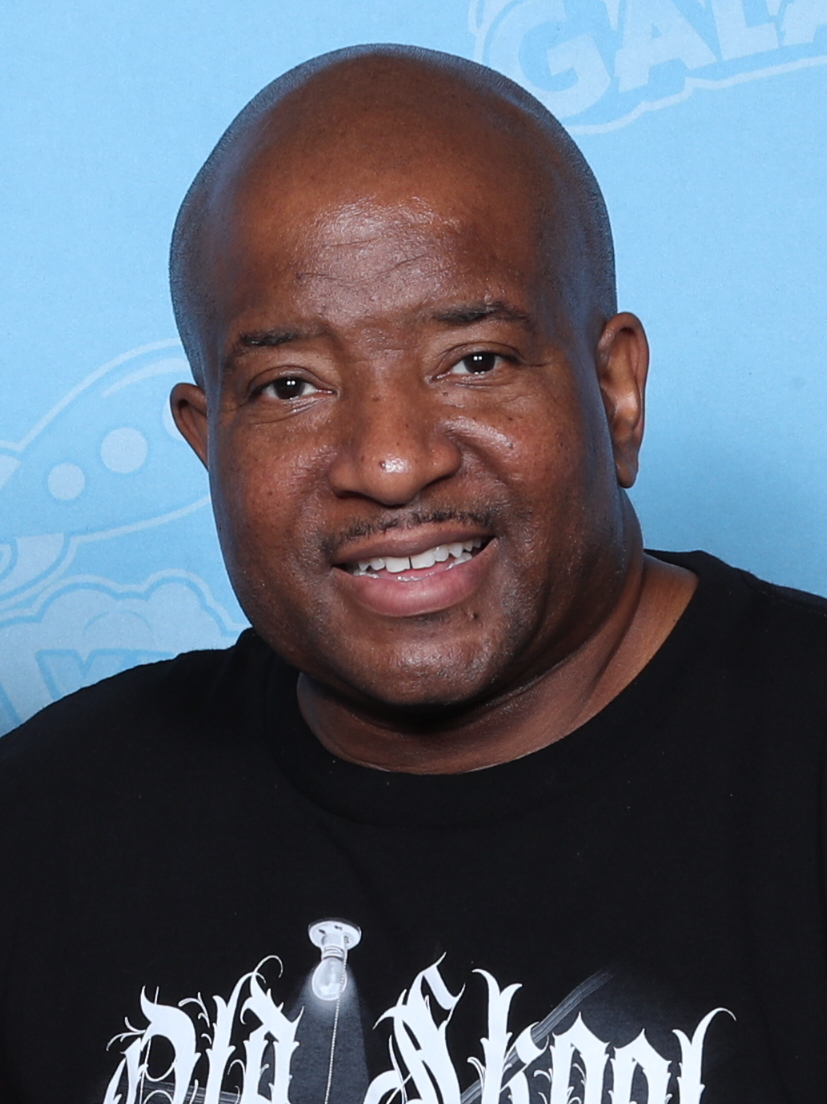
- Young MC at GalaxyCon Raleigh in 2021

Background information
- Also known as: Mr. M.C.; The Young M.C. Man
- Born: Marvin Young; May 10, 1967 (age 59); London, England, UK
- Origin: New York City, U.S.
- Genres: Hip hop; pop rap; funk
- Occupations: Rapper; singer-songwriter; producer; actor
- Years active: 1987–present
- Labels: Delicious Vinyl; Capitol; Overall; Young Man Moving
- Website: https://youngmc.com/

Marvin Young (born May 10, 1967), better known by his stage name Young M.C., is an American rapper, singer and actor. He is best known for his 1989 hit "Bust a Move". His debut album Stone Cold Rhymin' found international acclaim. Young has also appeared in film in acting roles and cameo appearances and has appeared in several television programs.

== Life and career ==
Young was born in Wimbledon, London, to Jamaican immigrant parents. He left the United Kingdom at the age of three and later moved to Queens, New York, when he was eight years old. Young attended Hunter College High School on the Upper East Side of Manhattan (he was honored at the school's 2018 convocation). He went on to earn a degree in economics from the University of Southern California (USC). At USC, he met Michael Ross and Matt Dike from the record company Delicious Vinyl. Young rapped over the phone for Ross and Dike, who ended up delivering a record contract to his USC dorm room. In 1989, Young collaborated with Tone Lōc on the songs "Wild Thing" and "Funky Cold Medina". Young gained fame with the release of his single "Bust a Move", which reached No. 7 on the Billboard Hot 100 and won a Grammy for Best Rap Performance. The single helped Young's debut album, Stone Cold Rhymin', to reach No. 9 on the Billboard 200 and attain platinum status in the United States. The follow-up single, "Principal's Office", was nominated for Best Rap Video at the 1990 MTV Video Music Awards.

Following Young's success, he left Delicious Vinyl, citing restrictions on his work and unwanted changes to his album. The label sued him for breach of contract and the two parties eventually settled out of court. Young signed with Capitol Records and released his second album, Brainstorm, in 1991. It reached No. 66 on the Billboard 200. Despite the absence of any strong single, the album achieved gold status in the United States. However his third album, What's the Flavor?, released in 1993, was a commercial failure, with both the album and its singles failing to chart. It was his second and final album on Capitol Records. In 1997, Young released his fourth album, Return of the 1 Hit Wonder, on the independent label Overall Records. The album produced two singles, "Madame Buttafly" and "On & Poppin" which charted at No. 25 and No. 23 respectively on the Hot Rap Songs chart.

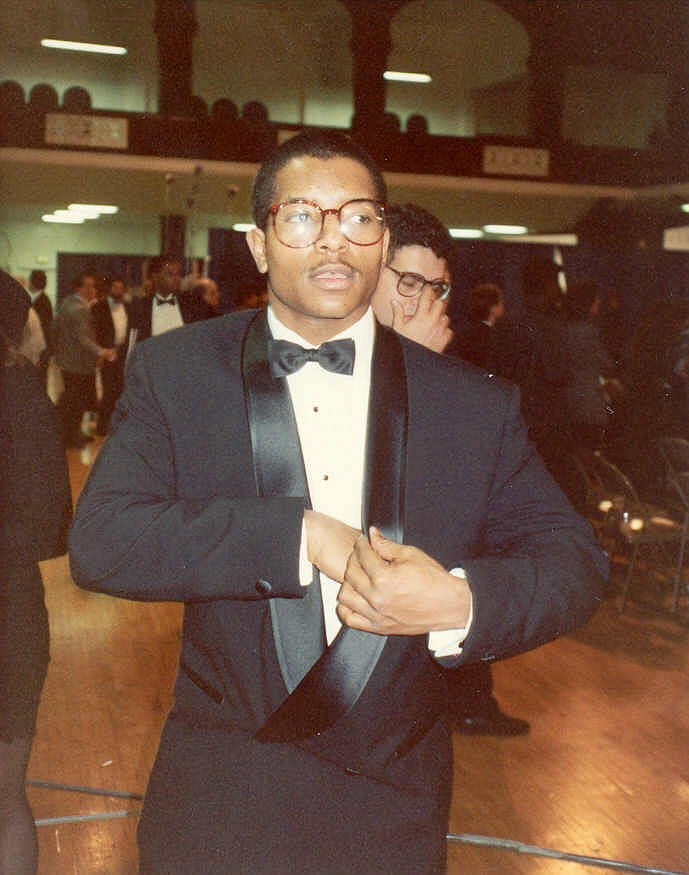
Young MC at the 1990 Grammy Awards

In 2000, Young released his fifth album, Ain't Goin' Out Like That, on his own record label Young Man Moving Records. The album was Young's first to chart since Brainstorm, peaking at No. 85 on the Top R&B/Hip-Hop Albums chart.

In 2001, Young contributed a song "Deck the Halls" he co-wrote with Kevin Irving, to Disney's TV movie, 'Twas the Night. In 2002, he released his sixth album, Engage the Enzyme. Also in 2002, Young appeared as a contestant on Weakest Link – Rap Stars Edition. He was joined by Rev Run of Run-DMC, DJ Quik, Jermaine Dupri, Da Brat, B-Real of Cypress Hill, Xzibit, and Nate Dogg. Young went on to win the celebrity contest, beating Xzibit in the final round. All of the proceeds from his winnings were donated to the Humane Society.

In December 2004, Young travelled to Vancouver to film The Zero Sum. Young played Mr. Henderson, a publishing company executive. Film director Raphael Assaf and screenwriter Armen Evrensel asked Young to help create the film, for which he is a co-executive producer. Young also teamed up with Baltimore rapper KNOXX to record "Brotherly Love", the theme song from the film.

In September 2005, Young was cast in the VH1 reality show Celebrity Fit Club 3. Joining Young was Kelly Le Brock, Bruce Vilanch, Tempestt Bledsoe, Countess Vaughn, Chaz Bono, Jeff Conaway, Gunnar Nelson, and Rapper Bizarre of D12. Young won the competition, losing more weight than anybody else.

Young also made an appearance in a special episode of The Best Damn Sports Show Period which featured the Top 50 Sports Moments of the 80's. Young crafted lyrics and performed a sports-themed rap song alongside KRS-One and Kool Moe Dee.

After twenty years of living in Los Angeles, Young relocated to Scottsdale, Arizona in 2006. He spent 2007 creating his seventh album, Adrenaline Flow, which was released in 2008. Immediately following Adrenaline Flow, Young released an online-only album, B-Sides, Demos and Remixes, compiled from unreleased, remixed and re-recorded tracks.

In 2009, Young released his eighth album, Relentless. Later that year, Young also landed a cameo role in the Jason Reitman film Up in the Air starring George Clooney. Young played himself, performing at a software convention which was crashed by Clooney's character and those of his two female co-stars, Anna Kendrick and Vera Farmiga.

On July 6, 2021, Young performed his signature hit song "Bust a Move" and other songs in the halftime show for Game 1 of the 2021 NBA Finals.

In October 2024, Young charted for the first time since 2002, with his song "Fun Part" reaching No. 38 on the Rhythmic Airplay chart.

== Discography ==
=== Albums ===
Year	Album	Chart positions			
Year	Album	US	US Hip-Hop	AUS	NZ
1989	Stone Cold Rhymin'	9	8	38	7
1991	Brainstorm	66	61	—	42
1993	What's the Flavor?	—	—	—	—
1997	Return of the 1 Hit Wonder	—	—	—	—
2000	Ain't Goin' Out Like That	—	85	—	—
2002	Engage the Enzyme	—	—	—	—
2007	Adrenaline Flow	—	—	—	—
2008	Relentless	—	—	—	—
"—" denotes an album that did not chart

=== Singles ===
Year	Single	Peak positions								Album
Year	Single	US	US Rap	US Dance	AUS	NZ	NLD	BEL (FL)	UK	Album
1988	"I Let 'Em Know"	—	—	—	—	—	—	—	—	Stone Cold Rhymin'
1988	"Know How"	—	—	—	—	—	—	—	95	Stone Cold Rhymin'
1989	"Bust a Move"	7	2	5	1	25	14	50	73	Stone Cold Rhymin'
1989	"Principal's Office"	33	9	47	50	5	43	—	54	Stone Cold Rhymin'
1990	"I Come Off"	75	—	36	43	19	—	—	78	Stone Cold Rhymin'
1990	"Pick Up the Pace (1990)"	—	—	—	147	38	—	—	—	Stone Cold Rhymin'
1990	"Louie Louie"	—	—	—	—	—	—	—	—	Coupe de Ville OST
1991	"That's the Way Love Goes"	54	—	—	63	23	—	—	65	Brainstorm
1991	"Keep It in Your Pants"	—	—	—	157	18	—	—	—	Brainstorm
1993	"What's the Flavor?"	—	—	—	—	—	—	—	—	What's the Flavor?
1996	"Get Your Boogie On" / "Rollin'"	—	—	—	—	—	—	—	—	single only
1997	"Madame Buttafly"	—	25	—	—	—	—	—	—	Return of the 1 Hit Wonder
1997	"On & Poppin'"	—	23	—	—	—	—	—	—	Return of the 1 Hit Wonder
2000	"Ain't Goin' Out Like That"	—	—	—	—	—	—	—	—	Ain't Goin' Out Like That
2002	"Bust a Move 2002"	—	—	—	96	—	—	—	—	single only
2002	"Heatseeker"	— (Note: "Heatseeker" did not chart on the Billboard Hot 100, but reached No. 6 on the Hot Singles Sales and No. 92 on the Hot R&B/Hip-Hop Songs.)	—	—	—	—	—	—	—	Engage the Enzyme
2003	"Stress Test"	—	—	—	—	—	—	—	—	Engage the Enzyme
2021	"Worry Bout That"	—	—	—	—	—	—	—	—	single only
2024	"Fun Part"	— (Note: "Fun Part" did not chart on the Billboard Hot 100, but reached No. 38 on the Rhythmic Airplay Chart.)	—	—	—	—	—	—	—	single only
"—" denotes a single that did not chart or was not released

== Filmography ==
Year	Title	Role	Comments
1992	Parker Lewis Can't Lose	Film Teacher	TV series, 1 episode
1993	The All New Mickey Mouse Club	Ben Covette Interview	TV series, 1 episode
1995	Panther	Recruit	
2009	The Zero Sum	Mr. Henderson	Also co-executive producer
2015	Justice Served	Troy Bannister	Also Producer
