= Matt Dike =

American music executive, producer, and DJ (1961–2018)

- Born: December 2, 1961; Suffern, New York, U.S.
- Died: January 16, 2018 (aged 56) Echo Park, Los Angeles, U.S.
- Genres: Hip-hop
- Years active: 1980s–2018

Matthew William Dike (December 2, 1961 – January 16, 2018) was an American music executive, record producer, and DJ. He co-founded the hip-hop record label Delicious Vinyl in 1987. In the 1980s, Dike was artist Jean-Michel Basquiat's studio assistant and he worked on the Beastie Boys album Paul's Boutique (1989). He co-wrote and produced the song "Bust A Move" (1989) by Young MC, and co-produced "Smart Girls" (1991) by Brian Wilson.

== Life and career ==
Matt Dike was born on December 2, 1961, in Suffern, New York, to Tanya Kulikoff, a homemaker, and Constant Dike, a general contractor. His family moved to Tuxedo Park, New York, where he attended high school. While a junior in high school, Dike began DJing at New York University's Weinstein Dormitory. After graduating from high school, Dike spent a year in London before relocating to Belmont Shores, California.

Dike was Jean-Michel Basquiat's studio assistant for four years during Basquiat's intermittent residencies in Los Angeles. He first met Basquiat while DJing at a party at New York University in 1978. In 1982, while Dike was the gallery assistant at Gagosian Gallery in West Hollywood, he befriended film director Tamra Davis, then a gallery assistant at Ulrike Kantor Gallery also in West Hollywood. Dike helped stretch canvases and installed work for Basquiat's 1982 exhibition at the Gagosian Gallery. When art dealer Larry Gagosian invited Basquiat to live and work at his Venice residence to prepare for his 1983 exhibition, he suggested that Dike and Davis spend time with Basquiat. Dike took Basquiat and his companions Rammellzee and Toxic to Tower Records on Sunset Boulevard. He also took them to the Rhythm Lounge bar on Melrose Avenue where Dike worked as doorman.

While working as DJ at the Rhythm Lounge in 1983, Dike met Mike Ross. They bonded over their love of hip-hop music, which was unusual for white music fans at the time. In the mid-1980s, Dike and Jon Sidel, a restaurateur and nightclub impresario, began a series of parties at temporary locations that amalgamated into the popular nightclub Power Tools. Celebrities such as Andy Warhol, Andy Summers, Malcolm McLaren, and Annie Lennox were attendees at the club. The Beastie Boys and Red Hot Chili Peppers were among the acts that performed at Power Tools before the club closed in 1987.

In 1987, Dike and Ross created the record label Delicious Vinyl and created a studio in Dike's Los Angeles apartment . In 1988, The A&R director/Promo Orlando Aguillen discovered the Dust Bros at a local college radio station, Claremont Ca. Once Orlando Aguillen introduced the Dust Bros. and Matt Dike, the Beastie Boys began recording their album Paul's Boutique (1989) at Dike's home studio. Dike worked on the album as a member of the Dust Brothers production crew. In 1989, Delicious Vinyl released the rap singles "Wild Thing" and "Funky Cold Medina" by Tone-Loc, and "Bust A Move" by Young MC, which would all reach the top ten on Billboard Hot 100 chart. The song "Bust a Move," produced and co-written by Dike and Ross, won the Grammy Award for Best Rap Performance in 1990. Following the success of the label, Dike became increasingly reclusive.

In 1995, Ross filed a petition in L.A. Superior Court seeking to become the provisional director for the label. In his petition, Ross alleged that in 1992, Dike "began to abdicate responsibility and management" of the label. Ross claimed that despite demanding for Dike to resume his responsibilities, he failed to attend board meetings and missed other critical meetings pertaining to the label's business.

== Death ==
On January 16, 2018, Dike died of complications of salivary gland cancer at his home in the Echo Park neighborhood of Los Angeles. He is survived by his brother Lane and sister Vikyana Dike.
