= Funky Cold Medina =

1989 single by Tone Lōc

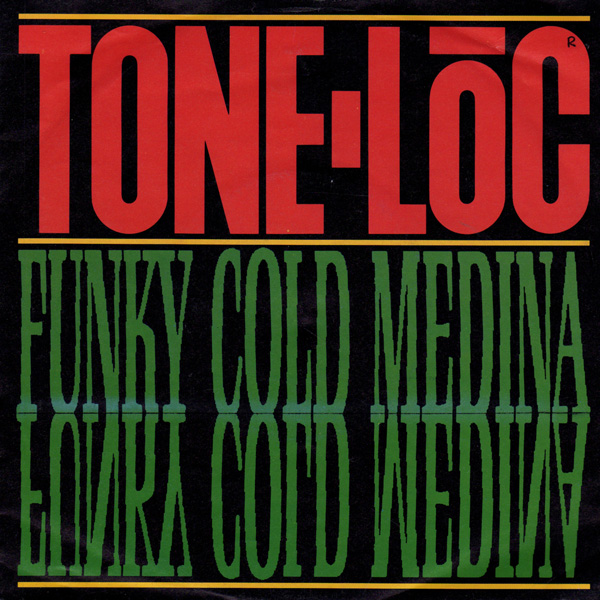

Single by Tone Lōc

from the album Lōc-ed After Dark
- Released: March 18, 1989
- Genre: Rap rock, hip hop
- Length: 4:08
- Label: Delicious Vinyl
- Songwriters: Marvin Young, Matt Dike, Michael Ross
- Producers: Matt Dike, Michael Ross

Tone Lōc singles chronology
"Wild Thing" (1989)	"Funky Cold Medina" (1989)	"I Got It Goin' On" (1990)

Music video
- "Funky Cold Medina" on YouTube

"Funky Cold Medina"
Tone Lōc's "Funky Cold Medina" from Lōc-ed After Dark

"Funky Cold Medina" is a song written by Young MC, Matt Dike and Michael Ross, and first performed by American rapper, actor and producer Tone Lōc. It was the second single from Tone Lōc's debut album, Lōc-ed After Dark (1989). The single was released on March 18, 1989, and rose to number three on the Billboard Hot 100 the following month where it went platinum, selling over one million copies and becoming the second ever platinum-certified rap single (after "Wild Thing" from the same album being the first). It peaked on the UK Singles Chart at number 13 in May of that year.

Flavor Flav had used the phrase "cold medina" a year earlier on It Takes a Nation of Millions to Hold Us Back, and it was adopted by his labelmates the Beastie Boys as a nickname for the cocktail known as a "fuzzy navel"; Flav later suggested to Tone Loc that he should use the phrase in a song.

The song contains several samples. The drum break is from "Get Off Your Ass and Jam" by Funkadelic, and the main guitar riff is from "Hot Blooded" by Foreigner. Other samples are taken from "(I Can't Get No) Satisfaction" by the Rolling Stones (when this song is mentioned in the lyrics), "Christine Sixteen" by Kiss, "All Right Now" by Free and "You Ain't Seen Nothing Yet" by Bachman–Turner Overdrive. The cowbell sample is from "Honky Tonk Women" by the Rolling Stones.

After the song became popular, several different cocktails were introduced bearing the name "Funky Cold Medina".

== Synopsis ==
The song tells of Tone Lōc's experiences with the "Funky Cold Medina", an aphrodisiac beverage. It starts with Lōc drinking at a bar and asking a fellow patron how he is having such success with women. The stranger credits his luck with Funky Cold Medina, which makes anyone who drinks it irresistible.

Lōc tests the formula on his dog, who becomes uncharacteristically affectionate towards Lōc and quickly gets swarmed by female dogs from the neighborhood. Lōc then tries it on a woman named Sheena he's attracted to, but upon returning to Lōc's home Sheena turns out to be a man, whom he ejects from his apartment forthwith. The next day, Lōc makes a celebrity appearance on Love Connection and meets a woman who immediately wants to marry him, which freaks him out. Lōc concludes the formula just brings trouble and resolves not to use it again.

== Charts ==
=== Weekly charts ===
Chart (1989)	Peak position
Australia (ARIA)	8
Austria (Ö3 Austria Top 40)	13
Canada Top Singles (RPM)	10
Canada Dance/Urban (RPM)	1
Finland (Suomen virallinen lista)	20
Netherlands (Dutch Top 40)	19
Netherlands (Single Top 100)	20
New Zealand (Recorded Music NZ)	3
Switzerland (Schweizer Hitparade)	13
UK Singles (Official Charts)	13
US Billboard Hot 100	3
US 12-inch Singles Sales (Billboard)	1
US Dance Club Play (Billboard)	8
US Hot Black Singles (Billboard)	7
US Hot Rap Singles (Billboard)	3
West Germany (GfK)	7

=== Year-end charts ===
Chart (1989)	Position
Australia (ARIA)	39
Canada Top Singles (RPM)	99
Canada Dance/Urban (RPM)	13
New Zealand (RIANZ)	32
US Billboard Hot 100	65
US 12-inch Singles Sales (Billboard)	23
US Hot Rap Singles (Billboard)	16
West Germany (Media Control)	27

== Certifications ==
Region	Certification	Certified units/sales
Australia (ARIA)	Gold	35,000^{^}
United States (RIAA)	Platinum	1,000,000^{^}
^{^} Shipments figures based on certification alone.
