= Aerosmith videography =

Aerosmith video discography
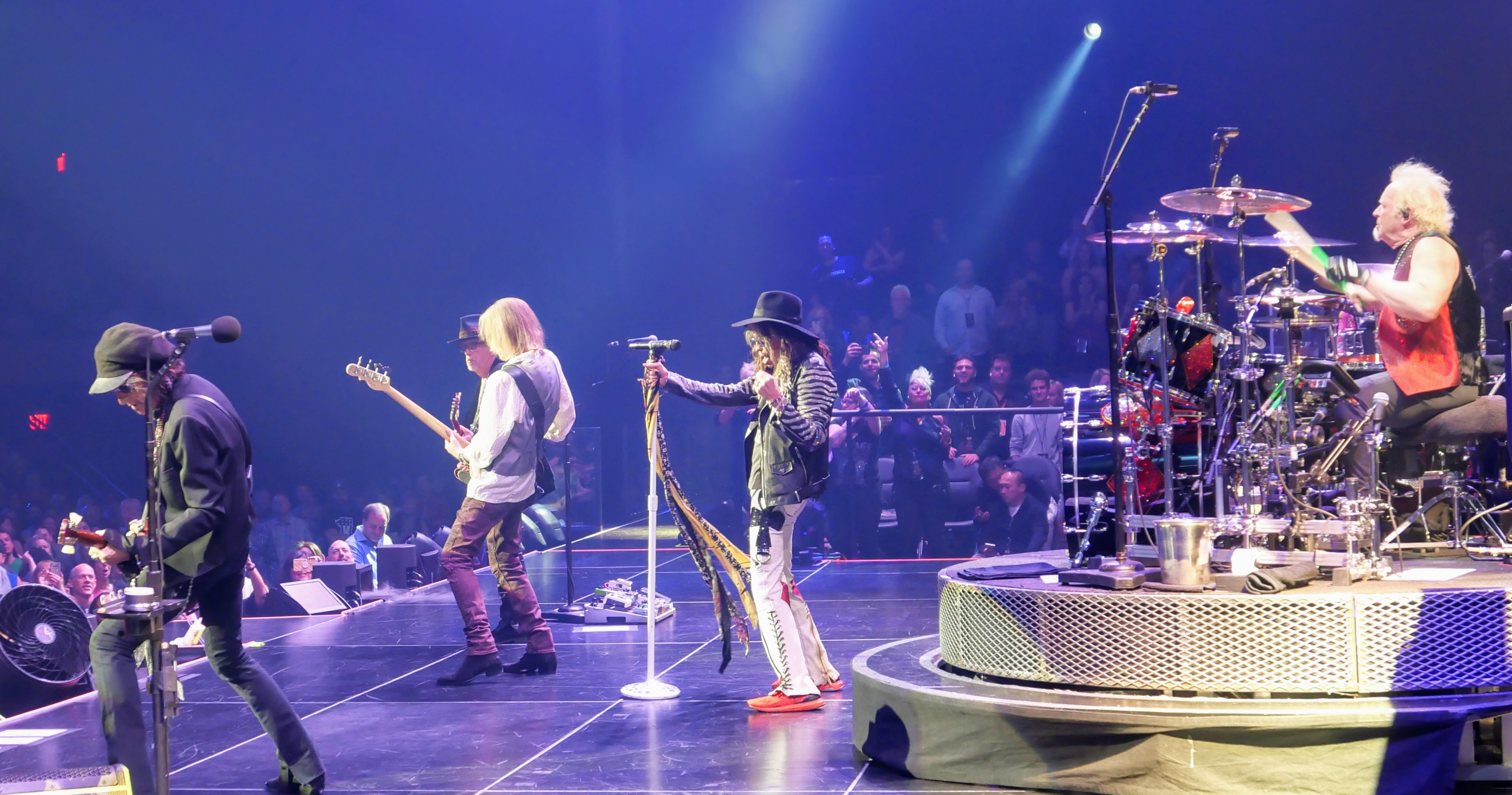
- Aerosmith performing in Las Vegas, Nevada on April 13, 2019.
- Soundtrack albums: 13
- Video albums: 9
- Music videos: 36

American rock band Aerosmith has released nine video albums and thirty-six music videos. The band and its music have also appeared in numerous films and soundtracks, and have inspired three video games.

== Video albums ==
Title	US date	Content	Format	Label	Certifications	Sales
Aerosmith Video Scrapbook	October 29, 1987	Live, promo videos and interviews	VHS, Betamax and LaserDisc	Columbia	Gold (US)	50,000
Permanent Vacation 3x5	August 23, 1988	Promo videos	VHS, LaserDisc and CDV	Geffen	Gold (US)	50,000
Live Texxas Jam '78	April 25, 1989	Live	VHS and LaserDisc	Columbia	Gold (US)	50,000
Things That Go Pump in the Night	June 12, 1990	Promo videos and documentary	VHS and LaserDisc	Geffen	Platinum (US)	100,000
The Making of Pump	October 9, 1990	Promo videos and documentary	VHS, LaserDisc and DVD	Geffen	Gold (US)	50,000
Big Ones You Can Look At	November 1, 1994	Promo videos and documentary	VHS, LaserDisc and CDV	Geffen	Gold (US), Gold (UK)	50,000
You Gotta Move	November 23, 2004	Live and documentary	DVD and CD	Columbia	4× Platinum (US), Gold (UK), Platinum (Aus)	400,000
Rock for the Rising Sun	July 23, 2013	Live 2011	DVD, Blu-ray and streaming	Eagle Rock Entertainment	—	—
Aerosmith Rocks Donington 2014	September 4, 2015	Live	DVD, Blu-ray and streaming	Eagle Rock Entertainment	—	—

== Music videos ==
Title	Date	Director	Stars	Awards
"Chip Away the Stone"	1978	Arnold Levine	-	-
"No Surprize"	1979	Arnold Levine	-	-
"Chiquita"	1979	Arnold Levine	-	-
"Lightning Strikes"	August 1982	Arnold Levine	-	-
"Let the Music Do the Talking"	November 1985	Jerry Kramer	-	-
"Walk This Way" (Run-DMC with Steven Tyler and Joe Perry)	July 1986	Jon Small	-	Ranked #11 in Rolling Stone's "Top 100 Music Videos", Ranked #5 in MTV's "100 Greatest Videos Ever Made", Ranked #11 in VH1's "100 Greatest Videos", Ranked #24 in Fuse's "25 Greatest Music Videos"
"Dude (Looks Like a Lady)"	October 1987	Marty Callner	John Kalodner	-
"Angel"	February 1988	Marty Callner	-	-
"Rag Doll"	May 1988	Marty Callner	-	-
"Love in an Elevator"	September 1989	Marty Callner	Brandi Brandt	-
"Janie's Got a Gun"	November 1989	David Fincher	Kristin Dattilo, Nicholas Guest, Lesley Ann Warren	MTV Video Music Award - Viewer's Choice, MTV Video Music Award for Best Rock Video, Ranked #48 in MTV's "100 Greatest Videos Ever Made", Ranked #48 in VH1's "100 Greatest Videos", Ranked #95 in Rolling Stone's "Top 100 Music Videos"
"What It Takes" (concept version)	March 1990	Wayne Isham	-	-
"What It Takes" (version with footage from The Making of Pump)	April 1990	Keith Garde & Martin Torgoff	-	-
"The Other Side"	June 1990	Marty Callner	John Kalodner	MTV Video Music Award for Best Rock Video
"Dream On" (with orchestra; recorded at MTV 10th anniversary special)	August 1991	Marty Callner	-	-
"Sweet Emotion"	November 21, 1991	Marty Callner	-	-
"Livin' on the Edge"	April 1993	Marty Callner	Edward Furlong	MTV Video Music Award - Viewer's Choice
"Eat the Rich"	May 1993	Greg Vernon	John Kalodner	-
"Cryin'"	July 1993	Marty Callner	Alicia Silverstone, Stephen Dorff, Josh Holloway	MTV Video Music Award for Best Video of the Year, MTV Video Music Award - Viewer's Choice, MTV Video Music Award for Best Group Video
"Amazing"	November 1993	Marty Callner	Alicia Silverstone, Jason London	-
"Crazy"	May 1994	Marty Callner	Alicia Silverstone, Liv Tyler	Ranked #23 in VH1's Top 100 Music Videos of All Time
"Blind Man"	October 1994	Marty Callner	Pamela Anderson, John Kalodner	-
"Deuces are Wild"	November 1994	-	-	-
"Walk on Water"	January 1995	Mick Haggerty	-	-
"Falling in Love (Is Hard on the Knees)"	February 1997	Michael Bay	Angie Everhart -	MTV Video Music Award for Best Rock Video
"Hole in My Soul"	May 1997	Andy Morahan	Branden Williams, Eva Mendes, Alexandra Holden, Seann William Scott	-
"Pink"	November 1997	Doug Nichol	-	MTV Video Music Award for Best Rock Video
"I Don't Want to Miss a Thing"	May 1998	Francis Lawrence	Liv Tyler	MTV Video Music Award for Best Video from a Film, Boston Music Awards: Best Video
"Full Circle"	April 1998	-	-	-
"Jaded"	February 2001	Francis Lawrence	Mila Kunis	Billboard Music Video Awards: Best Hard Rock Clip of the Year, Boston Music Awards: Video of the Year
"Fly Away from Here"	June 2001	Joseph Kahn	Jessica Biel	-
"Sunshine"	October 2001	Samuel Bayer	-	-
"Girls of Summer"	July 2002	David Meyers	Jaime Pressly- Kim Smith	
"Lizard Love"	2003	Jim Gable	-	-
"Baby, Please Don't Go"	2004	Mark Haefeli	-	-
"Legendary Child"	July 10, 2012	Casey Patrick Tebo	Alexa Vega	-
"What Could Have Been Love"	October 19, 2012	Marc Klasfeld	-	-

== Soundtracks ==
Individual songs appearing on film soundtracks

- "Come Together" – Sgt. Pepper's Lonely Hearts Club Band soundtrack (1978)
- "Rocking Pneumonia And The Boogie Woogie Flu" – Less than Zero soundtrack (1987)
- "Love Me Two Times" – Air America soundtrack (1990)
- "Dream On" – Last Action Hero soundtrack (1993)
- "Deuces Are Wild" – The Beavis and Butt-Head Experience (1993)
- "Dude (Looks Like a Lady)" (live) and "Shut Up and Dance" (live) – Wayne's World 2 soundtrack (1993)
- "I Don't Want to Miss a Thing", "What Kind of Love Are You On", "Sweet Emotion", and "Come Together" – Armageddon soundtrack (1998)
- "Angel's Eye" – Charlie's Angels soundtrack (2000)
- "Theme from Spider-Man" – Spider-Man soundtrack (2002)
- "Lizard Love" – Rugrats Go Wild soundtrack (2003)
- "Sweet Emotion" – Starsky & Hutch soundtrack (2004)
- "Walk This Way" – Sex and the City: The Movie soundtrack (2008)

== Song appearances ==
Individual songs appearing in films/trailers.

- "Sweet Emotion" – Light of Day (1987) sung by Joan Jett
- "Walk This Way" – The Lost Boys and China Girl (both 1987)
- "Dude (Looks Like a Lady)" – Like Father Like Son (1987)
- "Back in the Saddle" – Say Anything... (1989)
- "Sweet Emotion" – Dazed and Confused (1993)
- "The Other Side" – True Romance (1993)
- "Dude (Looks Like a Lady)" – Mrs. Doubtfire (1993)
- "Line Up" – Ace Ventura: Pet Detective (1994)
- "Janie's Got a Gun" – Airheads (1994)
- "Sweet Emotion" – Private Parts (1997)
- "I Don't Want to Miss a Thing" – Armageddon (1998)
- "Back in the Saddle" – Shanghai Noon (2000)
- "Toys in the Attic" and "Seasons of Wither" – Dogtown and Z-Boys (2001)
- "Janie's Got a Gun" – Not Another Teen Movie (2001) sung by Chris Evans a cappella
- "Dream On" – Miracle (2004)
- "Walk This Way" – Racing Stripes (2005)
- "Cryin'" – Be Cool (2005) - Duet with Christina Milian
- "Sweet Emotion" – Be Cool (2005)
- "You Gotta Move" – Barnyard (2006)
- "I Don't Want to Miss a Thing" – Blades of Glory (2007)
- "Back in the Saddle" – Red (2010)
- "Last Child" – Grown Ups (2010)
- "Dream On" – Argo (2012)

== Video games ==
Title	Date
Revolution X	1994
Quest for Fame	1995
Guitar Hero: Aerosmith	2008

== Filmography ==
Title	Date	Role
Sgt. Pepper's Lonely Hearts Club Band	1978	Future Villain Band
The Decline of Western Civilization Part II: The Metal Years	1988	Themselves
Saturday Night Live: Musical guests; "Wayne's World" sketch	1990	Themselves
The Simpsons: "Flaming Moe's episode	1991	Themselves (voices)
Wayne's World 2	1993	Themselves
Saturday Night Live: Musical guests; "Bad Dancer" sketch	1993	Themselves
Saturday Night Live: Musical guests; "Mary Katherine Gallagher" sketch	1997	Themselves
Saturday Night Live: Musical guests	2001	Themselves
Be Cool	2005	Themselves

== See also ==
- Aerosmith discography
- List of awards and nominations received by Aerosmith
