= Young Lust: The Aerosmith Anthology =

Compilation album by Aerosmith
- Released: November 20, 2001; January 11, 2005 (Gold)
- Recorded: 1985–1994, 1997–1998
- Genre: Hard rock, blues rock
- Length: 158:30
- Label: Geffen; Polydor (UK)
- Producer: Mike Ragogna

Aerosmith compilation chronology
| Classic Aerosmith: The Universal Masters Collection (2000) | Young Lust: The Aerosmith Anthology (2001) | O, Yeah! Ultimate Aerosmith Hits (2002) |

Gold
- Album art of 2005 reissue as Gold

Young Lust: The Aerosmith Anthology is a 2001 compilation album by American hard rock band Aerosmith. It features album cuts and hits from their Geffen Records years – between Done with Mirrors and Get a Grip – plus rarer material, B-sides, and live versions. It was reissued in 2005 as Gold, with a different cover.

== Track listing ==
Disc one ("Left Disc")
| No. | Title | Writer(s) | Length |
|---|---|---|---|
| 1. | "Let the Music Do the Talking" (from Done with Mirrors, 1985) | Joe Perry | 3:45 |
| 2. | "My Fist Your Face" (from Done with Mirrors) | Steven Tyler, Perry | 4:21 |
| 3. | "Shame on You" (from Done with Mirrors) | Tyler | 3:19 |
| 4. | "Heart's Done Time" (from Permanent Vacation, 1987) | Perry, Desmond Child | 4:40 |
| 5. | "Rag Doll" (from Permanent Vacation) | Tyler, Perry, Jim Vallance, Holly Knight | 4:24 |
| 6. | "Dude (Looks Like a Lady)" (from Permanent Vacation) | Tyler, Perry, Child | 4:23 |
| 7. | "Angel" (from Permanent Vacation) | Tyler, Child | 5:05 |
| 8. | "Hangman Jury" (from Permanent Vacation) | Tyler, Perry, Vallance | 5:32 |
| 9. | "Permanent Vacation" (from Permanent Vacation) | Tyler, Brad Whitford | 4:48 |
| 10. | "Young Lust" (from Pump, 1989) | Tyler, Perry, Vallance | 4:18 |
| 11. | "The Other Side" (from Pump) | Tyler, Vallance, Brian Holland, Lamont Dozier, Eddie Holland | 4:05 |
| 12. | "What It Takes" (from Pump) | Tyler, Perry, Child | 5:10 |
| 13. | "Monkey on My Back" (from Pump) | Tyler, Perry | 3:56 |
| 14. | "Love in an Elevator" (from Pump) | Tyler, Perry | 5:21 |
| 15. | "Janie's Got a Gun" (from Pump) | Tyler, Tom Hamilton | 5:26 |
| 16. | "Ain't Enough" (B-side of "Love in an Elevator", 1989) | Tyler, Perry | 4:57 |
| 17. | "Walk This Way (with Run-D.M.C.)" (from Run-D.M.C. album Raising Hell, 1986) | Tyler, Perry | 5:11 |

Disc two ("Right Disc")
| No. | Title | Writer(s) | Length |
|---|---|---|---|
| 1. | "Eat the Rich" (with Intro, from Get a Grip, 1993) | Tyler, Perry, Vallance | 4:32 |
| 2. | "Love Me Two Times" (from Air America, 1990) | Jim Morrison, Robby Krieger, Ray Manzarek, John Densmore | 3:14 |
| 3. | "Head First" (B-side of "Eat the Rich", 1993) | Tyler, Perry, Vallance | 4:42 |
| 4. | "Livin' on the Edge" (acoustic version; original version from Get a Grip) | Tyler, Perry, Mark Hudson | 5:37 |
| 5. | "Don't Stop" (B-side of "Livin' on the Edge", 1993) | Tyler, Perry, Vallance | 4:02 |
| 6. | "Can't Stop Messin'" (B-side of "Livin' on the Edge") | Tyler, Perry, Jack Blades, Tommy Shaw | 4:34 |
| 7. | "Amazing" (orchestral version; original version from Get a Grip) | Tyler, Richard Supa | 5:34 |
| 8. | "Cryin'" (from Get a Grip) | Tyler, Perry, Taylor Rhodes | 5:08 |
| 9. | "Crazy" (from Get a Grip) | Tyler, Perry, Child | 5:16 |
| 10. | "Shut Up and Dance" (from Get a Grip) | Tyler, Perry, Blades, Shaw | 4:50 |
| 11. | "Deuces Are Wild" (from The Beavis and Butt-Head Experience, Big Ones, 1994) | Tyler, Vallance | 3:32 |
| 12. | "Walk on Water" (from Big Ones) | Tyler, Perry, Blades, Shaw | 4:53 |
| 13. | "Blind Man" (from Big Ones) | Tyler, Perry, Rhodes | 3:57 |
| 14. | "Falling in Love (Is Hard on the Knees)" (Live from A Little South of Sanity, 1998) | Tyler, Perry, Glen Ballard | 3:24 |
| 15. | "Dream On" (Live from A Little South of Sanity) | Tyler | 4:52 |
| 16. | "Hole in My Soul" (Live from A Little South of Sanity) | Tyler, Perry, Child | 5:36 |
| 17. | "Sweet Emotion" (Live from A Little South of Sanity) | Tyler, Hamilton | 5:51 |
| Total length: | | | 2:38:30 |

== Personnel ==
- Steven Tyler – lead vocals, keyboards, harmonica, mandolin
- Joe Perry – lead guitar, appalachian dulcimer, backing vocals
- Brad Whitford – rhythm guitar
- Tom Hamilton – bass
- Joey Kramer – drums

Additional musicians

- Russ Irwin – Keyboards, Vocals (background)
- Thom Gimbel – Keyboards, Vocals (background)

=== Additional personnel ===
- Mike Ragogna – compilation producer
- Aerosmith – producer
- Michael Beinhorn – producer
- Russell Simmons – producer
- Ted Templeman – producer
- Rick Rubin – producer
- Bruce Fairbairn – producer
- Jack Douglas – producer, mixing
- Beth Stempel – production coordination
- Vartan – art direction
- Michael Fraser – mixing
- Brendan O'Brien – mixing
- Jeremy Holiday – A&R assistance
- Sal Nunziato – A&R assistance
- Barry Korkin – editorial assistant
- Erick Labson – mastering
- Kelly Martinez – licensing
- Geri Miller – liner notes
- David Campbell – conductor, string arrangements
- Gabrielle Revere – photography
- Norman Seeff – photography
- Neal Preston – photography
- Dennis Keeley – photography
- Gene Kirkland – photography

== Reception ==
Professional ratings
Review scores
| Source | Rating |
|---|---|
| AllMusic | 4/5 stars |
| Classic Rock | 4/5 stars |
| The Guardian | 3/5 stars |
| No Ripcord | 3/10 |

"A slightly confusing package," suggested Classic Rock. "For while claiming to sidestep the band's 70s material in favour of the group's later, outside-writer-bolstered tunes, the compilers just couldn't resist including 'Dream On' and 'Walk This Way'… There's a great version of The Doors' 'Love Me Two Times', 'Livin' on the Edge' sees the band stomp assuredly into the 90s, and even the bubblegum ballad 'Crazy' is delivered with a conviction that is beguiling."

== Charts ==
=== Weekly charts ===
Weekly chart performance for Young Lust: The Areosmith Anthology
| Chart (2001–2002) | Peak position |
|---|---|
| Australian Albums (ARIA) | 48 |
| Danish Albums (Hitlisten) | 21 |
| German Albums (Offizielle Top 100) | 78 |
| Italian Albums (FIMI) | 6 |
| New Zealand Albums (RMNZ) | 15 |
| Scottish Albums (OCC) | 10 |
| Swedish Albums (Sverigetopplistan) | 30 |
| UK Albums (OCC) | 32 |
| UK Rock & Metal Albums (OCC) | 3 |
| US Billboard 200 | 191 |

=== Year-end charts ===
Year-end chart performance for Young Lust: The Areosmith Anthology
| Chart (2002) | Position |
|---|---|
| Canadian Metal Albums (Nielsen Soundscan) | 95 |

== Certifications ==
Certifications for Young Lust: The Aerosmith Anthology
| Region | Certification | Certified units/sales |
|---|---|---|
| United Kingdom (BPI) | Platinum | 300,000^{*} |
| United States (RIAA) | Gold | 500,000^{^} |
^{*} Sales figures based on certification alone.^{^} Shipments figures based on certification alone.

== Release history ==
| Region | Date | Format | Tracks | Label | Catalog # | Barcode | Edition | Series | Notes |
|---|---|---|---|---|---|---|---|---|---|
| USA | Nov 20, 2001 | CD x 2 | 34 | Geffen/Universal | 069 493 119-2 | 606949311926 | — | — | |
| USA | Jan 11, 2005 | CD x 2 | 34 | Geffen/Universal | B0002936-02 | 602498628959 | — | Gold | Re-titled: Gold |
