= Big Ones =

Greatest hits album by Aerosmith
- Released: November 1, 1994
- Recorded: March – May 1987, April – June 1989, September – November 1992 at Little Mountain Sound Studios, Vancouver, British Columbia, Canada; January – February 1992 at A&M Studios, Los Angeles, California; April 1994 at The Power Station, New York City, New York; June 1994 at Capri Digital Studios, Capri, Italy
- Genres: Glam metal; hard rock; blues rock
- Length: 73:15
- Label: Geffen
- Producers: Bruce Fairbairn, Michael Beinhorn

Aerosmith compilation chronology
| Pandora's Toys (1994) | Big Ones (1994) | Box of Fire (1994) |

Singles from Big Ones
- 1. "Blind Man" Released: October 10, 1994; 2. "Walk on Water" Released: 1995

Big Ones is a compilation album by American rock band Aerosmith, released on November 1, 1994 by Geffen Records. Big Ones features 12 hits from the band's three consecutive multi-platinum albums, Permanent Vacation (1987), Pump (1989), and Get a Grip (1993), as well as the hit "Deuces Are Wild" from the compilation The Beavis and Butt-Head Experience (1993), and two new songs, "Blind Man" and "Walk on Water", which were recorded during a break in the band's Get a Grip Tour. These songs were also included on the band's 2001 compilation album, Young Lust: The Aerosmith Anthology. Big Ones is the band's second best-selling compilation album, reaching number 6 on the Billboard charts, and selling four million copies in the United States alone. The album quickly became a worldwide hit, reaching the Top 10 in nine countries before the end of the year.

== History ==
In March 1987, Aerosmith began working at Little Mountain Sound Studios in Vancouver, British Columbia, Canada for the album that became Permanent Vacation. The recordings were completed in May, the album was released in August, and reached number 11 on the Billboard 200. The album released several singles including "Dude (Looks Like a Lady)" (number 4 on the Mainstream Rock Charts, number 14 on the Billboard Hot 100), "Rag Doll" (number 12 Mainstream Rock Charts, number 17 Hot 100), and "Angel" (number 2 Mainstream Rock, number 3 Hot 100).

Then in April 1989, the band went back to Little Mountain Sound Studios to record songs for their next studio album, Pump. The recordings were completed in June 1989, the album was released in September, and reached number 5 on the Billboard 200. Several other singles were released from Pump including "Janie's Got a Gun" (number 2 Mainstream Rock, number 4 Hot 100), "Love in an Elevator" (number one Mainstream Rock, number 5 Hot 100), "The Other Side" (number one Mainstream Rock, number 22 Hot 100) and "What It Takes" (number one Mainstream Rock, number 9 Hot 100). In May a song was recorded during the sessions for Pump called "Deuces Are Wild", however it was not released on the album and was not released until the 1993 compilation album, The Beavis and Butt-head Experience.

In January 1992, the band began recording at A&M Studios in Los Angeles, California. The recordings at A&M ended in February and in September the band began recording again at Little Mountain Sound Studios. The recordings at Little Mountain ended in November, and Aerosmith's next studio album, Get a Grip was released in April 1993 and went to number one on the Billboard 200. The singles released from Get a Grip included "Amazing" (number 3 Mainstream Rock, number 9 Top 40 Mainstream, number 24 Hot 100), "Cryin'" (number 1 Mainstream Rock, number 11 Top 40 Mainstream, number 12 Hot 100), "Eat the Rich" (number 5 Mainstream Rock), "Livin' on the Edge" (number 1 Mainstream Rock, number 18 Hot 100, number 19 Top 40 Mainstream), and "Crazy" (number 7 Mainstream Rock, number 7 Top 40 Mainstream, number 17 Hot 100).

In April 1994 the band went to The Power Station in New York City, New York and started recording the songs "Walk on Water" and "Blind Man". The group then completed the songs in June at Capri Digital Studios, Capri, Italy. "Blind Man" reached number 3 on the Mainstream Rock Charts, number 23 on the Top 40 Mainstream, and number 48 on the Hot 100 in 1994. "Walk on Water" reached number 16 on the Mainstream Rock Charts in 1995.

No songs on Big Ones came from Aerosmith's first Geffen release, Done With Mirrors (1985), despite the hit "Let the Music Do the Talking" reaching number 18 on the Mainstream Rock Charts.

== Reception ==
Professional ratings
Review scores
| Source | Rating |
|---|---|
| AllMusic | 4.5/5 stars |
| Robert Christgau | (2-star Honorable Mention) |
| Collector's Guide to Heavy Metal | 7/10 |
| The Encyclopedia of Popular Music | 4/5 stars |
| Entertainment Weekly | A− |

For his review of Big Ones for AllMusic, Stephen Thomas Erlewine gave the album a high rating because he felt that the album captured the "comeback" of Aerosmith. However, he felt that the songs did not match the "rawness" of the band's earlier material, and seemed a little too "mainstream", with rampant over-production and too many power ballads. Robert Christgau did not think the album included enough songs from the album Get a Grip, and did not like that it excluded "My Fist, Your Face." However, he did like the two new tracks, "Walk on Water" and "Blind Man." Tom Sinclair thought well of the album in his review for Entertainment Weekly because it showed that they could mix hard rock and funk-based blues, and that they were more than just the American version of The Rolling Stones. He'd have given the album a higher rating had it not included the song "Angel".

== Track listing ==
Big Ones
| No. | Title | Writer(s) | Length |
|---|---|---|---|
| 1. | "Walk on Water" (previously unreleased) | Steven Tyler, Joe Perry, Jack Blades, Tommy Shaw | 4:54 |
| 2. | "Love in an Elevator" (from the album Pump) | Tyler, Perry | 5:21 |
| 3. | "Rag Doll" (from the album Permanent Vacation) | Tyler, Perry, Jim Vallance, Holly Knight | 4:24 |
| 4. | "What It Takes" (from the album Pump) | Tyler, Perry, Desmond Child | 5:09 |
| 5. | "Dude (Looks Like a Lady)" (from the album Permanent Vacation) | Tyler, Perry, Child | 4:23 |
| 6. | "Janie's Got a Gun" (from the album Pump) | Tyler, Tom Hamilton | 5:30 |
| 7. | "Cryin'" (from the album Get a Grip) | Tyler, Perry, Taylor Rhodes | 5:08 |
| 8. | "Amazing" (from the album Get a Grip) | Tyler, Richard Supa | 5:55 |
| 9. | "Blind Man" (previously unreleased) | Tyler, Perry, Rhodes | 4:00 |
| 10. | "Deuces Are Wild" (from the album The Beavis and Butt-Head Experience) | Tyler, Vallance | 3:35 |
| 11. | "The Other Side" (from the album Pump) | Tyler, Vallance | 4:03 |
| 12. | "Crazy" (from the album Get a Grip) | Tyler, Perry, Child | 5:16 |
| 13. | "Eat the Rich" (from the album Get a Grip) | Tyler, Perry, Vallance | 4:10 |
| 14. | "Angel" (from the album Permanent Vacation) | Tyler, Child | 5:07 |
| 15. | "Livin' on the Edge" (from the album Get a Grip) | Tyler, Perry, Mark Hudson | 6:22 |
| Total length: | | | 73:15 |

Japanese and European edition bonus tracks
| No. | Title | Writer(s) | Length |
|---|---|---|---|
| 16. | "Dude (Looks Like a Lady)" (Live) | Tyler, Perry, Child | 5:20 |
| Total length: | | | 1:18:35 |

Special Edition Disc Two - all tracks taken from live album A Little South of Sanity
| No. | Title | Writer(s) | Length |
|---|---|---|---|
| 1. | "Falling in Love (Is Hard on the Knees)" | Tyler, Perry, Glen Ballard | 3:20 |
| 2. | "Hole in My Soul" | Tyler, Perry, Child | 5:41 |
| 3. | "Walk on Down" | Perry | 5:09 |
| 4. | "Dream On" | Tyler | 3:40 |
| 5. | "Back in the Saddle" | Tyler, Perry | 4:42 |
| 6. | "Mama Kin" | Tyler | 4:06 |
| 7. | "Walk This Way" | Tyler, Perry | 4:07 |
| 8. | "Sweet Emotion" | Tyler, Hamilton | 5:57 |

NB: "Love in an Elevator", "Janie's Got a Gun", and "The Other Side" are presented without their original lead-ins as heard on Pump ("Going Down", "Water Song", and "Dulcimer Stomp", respectively).

== Personnel ==
Per liner notes

Aerosmith

- Steven Tyler – lead vocals, keyboards, harmonica
- Tom Hamilton – bass, backing vocals on "Love in an Elevator"
- Joey Kramer – drums
- Joe Perry – lead and rhythm guitar, backing vocals, pedal steel guitar
- Brad Whitford – rhythm and lead guitar, acoustic guitar

Additional musicians

- Jim Vallance – organ on "Rag Doll"
- Drew Arnott – mellotron on "Angel"
- Tom Keenlyside – saxophone, tenor saxophone, clarinet, horn arrangement
- Ian Putz – baritone saxophone
- Bob Rogers – trombone
- Henry Christian – trumpet
- Bruce Fairbairn – trumpet, background vocals on "Love in an Elevator"
- Bob Dowd – background vocals on "Love in an Elevator"
- John Webster – keyboards
- Richard Supa – keyboards on "Amazing"
- Don Henley – background vocals on "Amazing"
- Desmond Child – keyboards on "Crazy"
- Paul Baron – trumpet
- Mapuhi T. Tekurio – Polynesian log drums on "Eat the Rich"
- Melvin Liufau – Polynesian log drums on "Eat the Rich"
- Wesey Mamea – Polynesian log drums on "Eat the Rich"
- Liainaiala Tagaloa – Polynesian log drums on "Eat the Rich"
- Sandy Kanaeholo – Polynesian log drums on "Eat the Rich"
- Aladd Alatina Teofilo Jr. – Polynesian log drums on "Eat the Rich"

Production

- Bruce Fairbairn – producer
- Michael Beinhorn – producer on "Walk on Water" and "Blind Man"
- Mike Fraser – engineer, mixing
- Bob Rock – engineer on tracks from Permanent Vacation
- Ken Lomas – assistant engineer, second engineer
- Karl Heilbron - assistant engineer. Deuces are Wild mix.
- Brendan O'Brien – mixing on Get a Grip tracks and "Deuces Are Wild".
- Tim Collins – management
- John Kalodner – artists and repertoire
- George Marino – mastering
- David J. Donnelly – mastering supervision
- Gibran Evans – design
- FPG International – photography
- Steve Gardner – photography
- Norman Seeff – photography

== Charts ==
=== Weekly charts ===
Weekly chart performance for Big Ones
| Chart (1994–95) | Peak position |
|---|---|
| Australian Albums (ARIA) | 11 |
| Austrian Albums (Ö3 Austria) | 4 |
| Canada Top Albums/CDs (RPM) | 2 |
| Danish Albums (IFPI) | 1 |
| Dutch Albums (Album Top 100) | 8 |
| European Albums (Top 100) | 4 |
| Finnish Albums (Suomen virallinen lista) | 3 |
| French Albums (SNEP) | 45 |
| German Albums (Offizielle Top 100) | 5 |
| Hungarian Albums (MAHASZ) | 11 |
| Italian Albums (Musica e Dischi) | 22 |
| Japanese Albums (Billboard) | 5 |
| New Zealand Albums (RMNZ) | 4 |
| Norwegian Albums (VG-lista) | 9 |
| Portuguese Albums (AFP) | 5 |
| Scottish Albums (Official Charts) | 5 |
| Swedish Albums (Sverigetopplistan) | 5 |
| Swiss Albums (Schweizer Hitparade) | 6 |
| UK Albums (Official Charts) | 7 |
| UK Rock & Metal Albums (Official Charts) | 4 |
| US Billboard 200 | 5 |

2006 chart performance for Big Ones
| Chart (2006) | Peak position |
|---|---|
| Spanish Albums (Promusicae) | 87 |

=== Year-end charts ===
1994 year-end chart performance for All-4-One
| Chart (1994) | Position |
|---|---|
| Australian Albums (ARIA) | 91 |
| Canada Top Albums/CDs (RPM) | 43 |
| Dutch Albums (Album Top 100) | 56 |
| Swedish Albums (Sverigetopplistan) | 39 |
| UK Albums (OCC) | 44 |

1995 year-end chart performance for All-4-One
| Chart (1995) | Position |
|---|---|
| Dutch Albums (Album Top 100) | 75 |
| European Albums (European Top 100 Albums) | 50 |
| German Albums (Offizielle Top 100) | 75 |
| US Billboard 200 | 24 |

== Certifications ==
Certifications and sales for Big Ones
| Region | Certification | Certified units/sales |
|---|---|---|
| Argentina (CAPIF) | 3× Platinum | 180,000^{^} |
| Australia (ARIA) | Gold | 35,000^{^} |
| Austria (IFPI Austria) | Gold | 25,000^{*} |
| Brazil (Pro-Música Brasil) | Gold | 100,000^{*} |
| Canada (Music Canada) | 8× Platinum | 800,000^{^} |
| Finland (Musiikkituottajat) | Platinum | 40,060 |
| Germany (BVMI) | Gold | 250,000^{^} |
| Japan (RIAJ) | Platinum | 200,000^{^} |
| Mexico (AMPROFON) | Gold | 100,000^{^} |
| Netherlands (NVPI) | Gold | 50,000^{^} |
| New Zealand (RMNZ) | Gold | 7,500^{^} |
| Norway (IFPI Norway) | Platinum | 50,000^{*} |
| Spain (Promusicae) | Gold | 50,000^{^} |
| Sweden (GLF) | Platinum | 100,000^{^} |
| United Kingdom (BPI) | Platinum | 300,000^{^} |
| United States (RIAA) | 4× Platinum | 4,000,000^{^} |
Summaries
| Europe (IFPI) | Platinum | 1,000,000^{*} |
^{*} Sales figures based on certification alone.^{^} Shipments figures based on certification alone.

== Release history ==
| Region | Date | Format | Tracks | Label | Catalog # | Barcode | Edition | Series | Notes |
|---|---|---|---|---|---|---|---|---|---|
| USA | Nov 1, 1994 | CD | 15 | Geffen/MCA | GEFD-24716 | 720642471623 | — | — | |
| USA | Nov 1, 1994 | Cassette | 15 | Geffen/MCA | GEFC-24716 | 720642471647 | — | — | |

== See also ==
- Big Ones You Can Look At
- List of best-selling albums in Argentina
