= Toxic Twins =

Music duo composed of Steven Tyler and Joe Perry

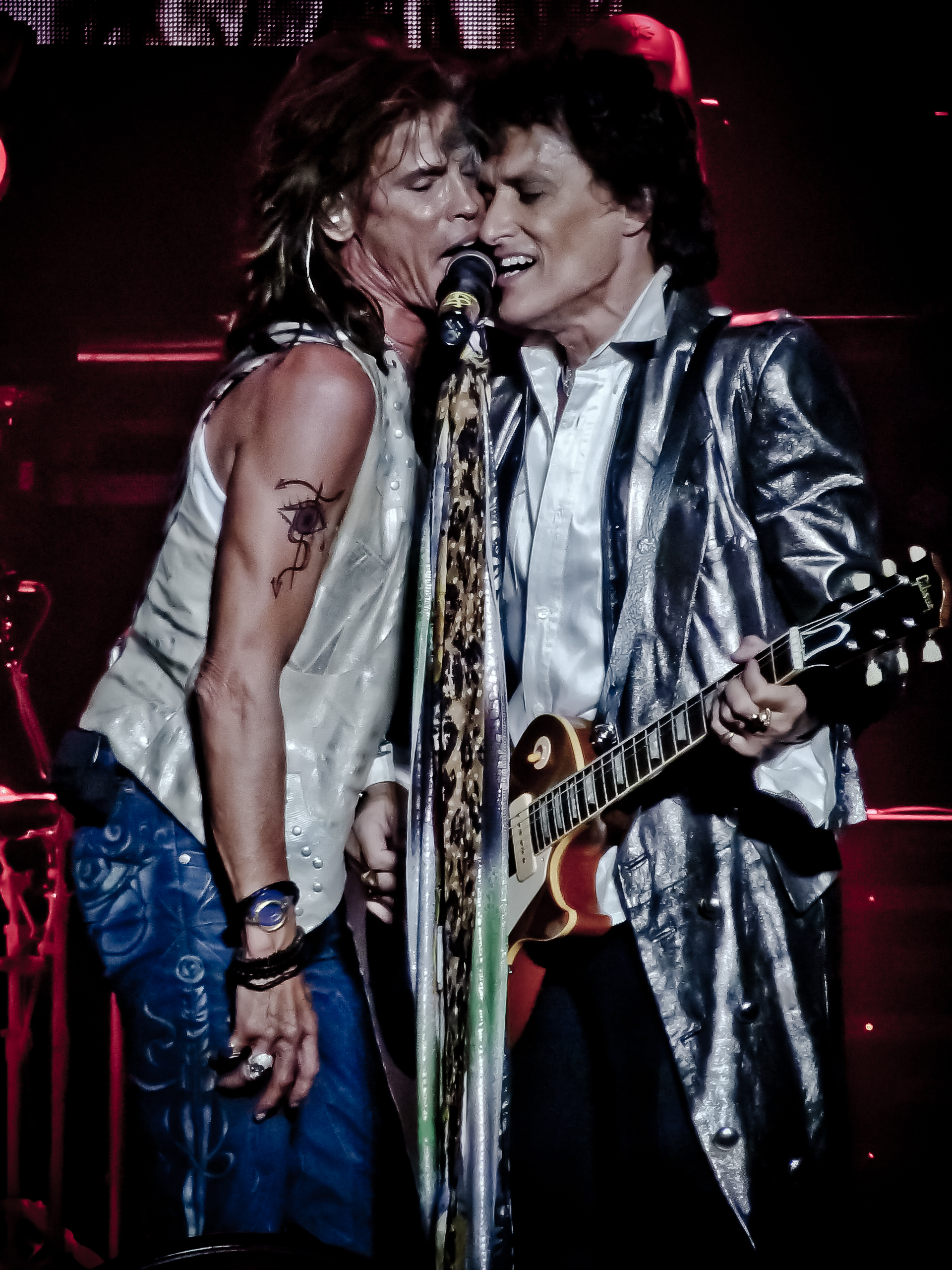
The Toxic Twins performing together in 2010

The Toxic Twins is a nickname given to lead singer Steven Tyler and lead guitarist Joe Perry of American hard rock band Aerosmith. They were given that name in the 1970s due to their rampant use of drugs both on and off stage.

Despite maintaining sobriety for most of the past 30 years, Tyler and Perry have continued to be known as the Toxic Twins. Their camaraderie can be viewed in several of the band's videos, including The Making of Pump, Big Ones You Can Look At, and You Gotta Move.

An accomplished songwriting duo, the Toxic Twins are often referred to as the "Tyler/Perry" partnership in songwriting. They have written over 85 songs together. In 2013, Tyler and Perry were recipients of the ASCAP Founders Award and were inducted into the Songwriters Hall of Fame.

== Collaborations ==
Often, the Toxic Twins appear for special performances, appearances, and collaborations without the other members of Aerosmith.

Additionally, Tyler and Perry are part of the "Boneyard Boys", a loose collective of musicians which was formed in the late 1990s. In addition to Tyler and Perry, the Boneyard Boys include friends Marti Frederiksen and Mark Hudson who, among others, helped spearhead the songwriting, production, and much of the creative process in Aerosmith.

== Songwriting partnership ==
Tyler and Perry are a notable songwriting duo. The list of songs they have co-written includes the following:

- "Movin' Out" (1973)
- "Same Old Song and Dance" (1974)
- "Toys in the Attic" (1975)
- "Walk This Way" (1975)
- "No More No More" (1975)
- "Back in the Saddle" (1976)
- "Rats in the Cellar" (1976)
- "Get the Lead Out" (1976)
- "Lick and a Promise" (1976)
- "Draw the Line" (1977)
- "I Wanna Know Why" (1977)
- "Get It Up" (1977)
- "Sight for Sore Eyes" (with Jack Douglas and David Johansen; 1977)
- "No Surprize" (1979)
- "Chiquita" (1979)
- "Cheese Cake" (1979)
- "Three Mile Smile" (1979)
- "Bone to Bone (Coney Island Whitefish Boy)" (1979)
- "My Fist Your Face" (1985)
- "Gypsy Boots" (1985)
- "She's on Fire" (1985)
- "The Hop" (with Tom Hamilton, Joey Kramer, and Brad Whitford; 1985)
- "Magic Touch" (with Jim Vallance; 1987)
- "Rag Doll" (with Vallance and Holly Knight; 1987)
- "Simoriah" (with Vallance; 1987)
- "Dude (Looks Like a Lady)" (with Desmond Child; 1987)
- "Hangman Jury" (with Vallance; 1987)
- "Girl Keeps Coming Apart" (1987)
- "The Movie" (with Hamilton, Kramer and Whitford; 1987)
- "Young Lust" (1989)
- "F.I.N.E.*" (1989)
- "Love in an Elevator" (1989)
- "Monkey on My Back" (1989)
- "My Girl" (1989)
- "Don't Get Mad Get Even" (1989)
- "Hoodoo/Voodoo Medicine Man" (with Whitford; 1989)
- "What It Takes" (with Child; 1989)
- "Ain't Enough" (1989)
- "Intro" (with Vallance; 1993)
- "Eat the Rich" (with Vallance; 1993)
- "Get a Grip" (with Vallance; 1993)
- "Fever" (1993)
- "Livin' on the Edge" (with Mark Hudson; 1993)
- "Flesh" (with Child; 1993)
- "Shut Up and Dance" (with Jack Blades and Tommy Shaw; 1993)
- "Cryin'" (with Taylor Rhodes; 1993)
- "Gotta Love It" (with Hudson; 1993)
- "Crazy" (with Child; 1993)
- "Line Up" (with Lenny Kravitz; 1993)
- "Boogie Man" (with Vallance; 1993)
- "Don't Stop" (with Vallance; 1993)
- "Can't Stop Messin'" (with Blades and Shaw; 1993)
- "Head First" (with Vallance; 1993)
- "Walk on Water" (with Blades and Shaw; 1994)
- "Blind Man" (with Rhodes; 1994)
- "Nine Lives" (with Marti Frederiksen; 1997)
- "Falling in Love (Is Hard on the Knees)" (with Glen Ballard; 1997)
- "Hole in My Soul" (with Child; 1997)
- "Taste of India" (with Ballard; 1997)
- "Something's Gotta Give" (with Frederiksen; 1997)
- "Ain't That a Bitch" (with Child; 1997)
- "The Farm" (with Hudson and Steve Dudas; 1997)
- "Crash" (with Hudson and Dominik Miller; 1997)
- "Attitude Adjustment" (with Frederiksen; 1997)
- "Fallen Angels" (with Richard Supa; 1997)
- "What Kind of Love Are You On" (with Blades and Shaw; 1998)
- "Angel's Eye" (with Frederiksen and Rhodes; 2000)
- "Beyond Beautiful" (with Frederiksen and Hudson; 2001)
- "Trip Hoppin'" (with Frederiksen and Hudson; 2001)
- "Sunshine" (with Frederiksen; 2001)
- "Under My Skin" (with Frederiksen and Hudson; 2001)
- "Luv Lies" (with Frederiksen and Hudson; 2001)
- "Outta Your Head" (with Frederiksen; 2001)
- "Drop Dead Gorgeous" (with Hudson; 2001)
- "Light Inside" (with Frederiksen; 2001)
- "Avant Garden" (with Frederiksen and Hudson; 2001)
- "Girls of Summer" (with Frederiksen; 2002)
- "Lay it Down" (with Frederiksen and DeGrate; 2002)
- "The Grind" (with Frederiksen; 2004)
- "Devil's Got a New Disguise" (with Diane Warren; 2006)
- "Sedona Sunrise" (with Vallance; 2006)
- "LUV XXX" (2012)
- "Out Go the Lights" (2012)
- "Legendary Child" (with Vallance; 2012)
- "Street Jesus" (with Whitford; 2012)
- "Lover Alot" (with Frederiksen, Hamilton, Whitford, Kramer, Jesse Kramer and Marco Moir; 2012)
- "Another Last Goodbye" (with Child; 2012)
- "My Only Angel" (with Yungblud and Matt Schwartz; 2025)

== Personal life ==
In the mid-1990s, between the albums Get a Grip and Nine Lives, Tyler and Perry and their families vacationed together in Florida. The Toxic Twins were also notably featured in Ted Nugent's book God, Guns, and Rock 'n' Roll, in which Nugent praises the duo for becoming clean and talks about how they came to his ranch in the 1990s to shoot firearms and spend time with him and his family.
