= A Little South of Sanity =

Live album and compilation album by Aerosmith
- Released: October 20, 1998
- Recorded: 1993–1994 (Get a Grip Tour); 1997–1998 (Nine Lives Tour)
- Genre: Hard rock; glam metal; heavy metal; blues rock
- Length: 115:17
- Label: Geffen
- Producer: Aerosmith, Jack Douglas

Aerosmith live chronology
Classics Live I and II (1987)	A Little South of Sanity (1998)	Rockin' the Joint (2005)

Professional ratings
Review scores
Source	Rating
AllMusic	2.5/5 stars
Collector's Guide to Heavy Metal	6/10
The Encyclopedia of Popular Music	3/5 stars
Entertainment Weekly	B
The Independent	3/5 stars
NME	4/10
Q	4/5 stars
Rolling Stone	2/5 stars

A Little South of Sanity is a live and compilation album by American hard rock band Aerosmith, released on October 20, 1998, by Geffen Records. The two-disc album features recordings taken while the band was on the Nine Lives Tour, which began in 1997 and was still ongoing at the time of the live album release, and the Get a Grip Tour, which the band was on tour with from 1993 to 1994.

This release was the only Aerosmith album to receive the Parental Advisory sticker, primarily due to lead singer Steven Tyler shouting profanities in between songs and modifying some song lyrics to racier ones, although some other song lyrics had profanity in their original studio versions as well.

== Production ==
Shortly after the band reunited in 1984, they signed a contract to generate six albums for Geffen. Three of these, the studio releases Done With Mirrors, Permanent Vacation, and Pump, were finished before Aerosmith agreed to a contract with Columbia Records in 1991. The contract was not due to take effect until after Aerosmith's obligations to Geffen were fulfilled, but after the 1993 album Get a Grip was released, the band did not record another studio album for the label. Instead, a compilation of their hits from the Geffen era, titled Big Ones, was put together and plans for a live album were conceived as Aerosmith went to Columbia.

== Artwork ==
Filmmaker Patrick Connolly claims that he inspired, and is depicted on, the album cover. As a teenager, Connolly was the gas station attendant for Aerosmith drummer Joey Kramer when Kramer's Ferrari caught fire while refueling. At the time of the incident and for a time after, Joey Kramer was convinced that the fire was Patrick Connolly's fault. Connolly maintains that the album's cover, released in October 1998, features an image of a gas attendant who bears a resemblance to a teenage Connolly. He is convinced that the album cover artwork was intended to mockingly blame him for the July 15, 1998 incident. The fire was later found to be caused by a defective fuel line in the vehicle's gas tank.

== Live sources ==
There are no official listings to support where or when each performance was culled from; the CD booklet only mentions they were recorded during the Get a Grip and Nine Lives world tours. However, the recordings of "Love in an Elevator", "Same Old Song and Dance", and "Sweet Emotion" each have Tyler calling out to the live crowd, revealing where they were recorded. The first song has him mentioning the crowd in State College, Pennsylvania, the second a crowd in West Palm Beach, Florida, and the third a crowd in Seattle, Washington.

== Track listing ==
Disc 1
No.	Title	Writer(s)	Length
1.	"Eat the Rich" (San Jose, Costa Rica, 10 November 1994)	Steven Tyler, Joe Perry, Jim Vallance	5:14
2.	"Love in an Elevator" (University Park, PA, January 19, 1998)	Tyler, Perry	5:56
3.	"Falling in Love (Is Hard on the Knees)" (West Palm Beach, FL, October 5, 1997)	Tyler, Perry, Glen Ballard	3:20
4.	"Same Old Song and Dance" (West Palm Beach, FL, October 5, 1997)	Tyler, Perry	5:58
5.	"Hole in My Soul" (West Palm Beach, FL, October 5, 1997)	Tyler, Perry, Desmond Child	5:40
6.	"Monkey on My Back" (Seattle, WA, October 20, 1997)	Tyler, Perry	4:08
7.	"Livin' on the Edge" (Vancouver, Canada, October 25, 1997)	Tyler, Perry, Mark Hudson	5:24
8.	"Cryin'" (Helsinki, Finland, May 25. 1997)	Tyler, Perry, Taylor Rhodes	5:11
9.	"Rag Doll" (Anaheim, CA, December 16. 1997)	Tyler, Perry, Vallance, Holly Knight	4:14
10.	"Angel" (Tokyo, Japan, March 8, 1998)	Tyler, Desmond Child	5:35
11.	"Janie's Got a Gun" (Las Vegas, NV, December 7. 1997)	Tyler, Tom Hamilton	5:07
12.	"Amazing" (Castle Donington, UK, June 4, 1994)	Tyler, Richard Supa	5:23

Disc 2
No.	Title	Writer(s)	Length
1.	"Back in the Saddle" (West Palm Beach, FL, October 5, 1997)	Tyler, Perry	6:11
2.	"Last Child" (Yokohama, Japan, March 12, 1998)	Tyler, Brad Whitford	5:05
3.	"The Other Side" (Las Vegas, NV, December 7, 1997)	Tyler, Vallance, Eddie Holland, Brian Holland, Lamont Dozier	4:40
4.	"Walk on Down" (Mansfield, MA, August 20, 1994)	Perry	3:41
5.	"Dream On" (Las Vegas, NV, December 7, 1997)	Tyler	4:51
6.	"Crazy" (San Jose, Costa Rica, November 10, 1994)	Tyler, Perry, Child	5:45
7.	"Mama Kin" (Boston, MA, December 30, 1997)	Tyler	4:12
8.	"Walk This Way" (Albany, NY, January 13, 1998)	Tyler, Perry	4:08
9.	"Dude (Looks Like a Lady)" (Albany, NY, January 13, 1998)	Tyler, Perry, Child	4:22
10.	"What It Takes" (Albany, NY, January 13, 1998 and Columbia, SC, January 29)	Tyler, Perry, Child	5:15
11.	"Sweet Emotion" (Seattle, WA, October 22, 1997)	Tyler, Hamilton	5:57

== Personnel ==
- Steven Tyler – lead vocals, harmonica, percussion
- Joe Perry – guitar, backing vocals, talkbox on "Sweet Emotion", pedal steel guitar on "Rag Doll", lead vocals on "Walk on Down"
- Brad Whitford – guitar
- Tom Hamilton – bass
- Joey Kramer – drums

Additional musicians

- Russ Irwin – keyboards, backing vocals
- Thom Gimbel – keyboards, backing vocals

Production

- Engineer: Jay Messina
- Assistant engineers: Lawrence Manchester, John Wydrycs
- Producer, mixing at Chung King Studios, New York: Jack Douglas
- Mastering: Greg Calbi
- Monitor engineer: Mike Sprague
- Director, lighting design: Jim Chapman
- Photography: Moshe Brakha
- Clothing/wardrobe: Sherry Willshire

== Charts ==
Weekly chart performance for A Little South of Sanity
Chart (1998)	Peak position
Australian Albums (ARIA)	141
Austrian Albums (Ö3 Austria)	37
Belgian Albums (Ultratop Flanders)	34
Belgian Albums (Ultratop Wallonia)	10
Canadian Albums (Billboard)	6
Dutch Albums (Album Top 100)	34
Finnish Albums (Suomen virallinen lista)	24
French Albums (SNEP)	39
German Albums (Offizielle Top 100)	21
Italian Albums (FIMI)	8
Japanese Albums (Oricon)	3
New Zealand Albums (RMNZ)	47
Scottish Albums (Official Charts)	45
Spanish Albums (AFYVE)	43
Swiss Albums (Schweizer Hitparade)	24
Swedish Albums (Sverigetopplistan)	16
UK Albums (Official Charts)	36
UK Rock & Metal Albums (Official Charts)	1
US Billboard 200	12

== Certifications ==
Certifications and sales for A Little South of Sanity
Region	Certification	Certified units/sales
Canada (Music Canada)	Platinum	100,000^{^}
Japan (RIAJ)	Platinum	200,000^{^}
United Kingdom (BPI)	Gold	100,000^{‡}
United States (RIAA)	Platinum	1,000,000^{^}
Summaries
Latin America	—	450,000
^{^} Shipments figures based on certification alone.^{‡} Sales+streaming figures based on certification alone.

== Release history ==
Region	Date	Format	Tracks	Label	Catalog #	Barcode	Edition	Series	Notes
USA	Oct 20, 1998	CD x 2	23	Geffen/Universal	GEFD2-25221	720642522127	Explicit Version	—	
USA	Oct 20, 1998	Cassette x 2	23	Geffen/Universal	GEFC2-25221	720642522141	Explicit Version	—	
USA	Oct 20, 1998	CD x 2	23	Geffen/Universal	GEFD2-25308	720642530825	Clean Version	—	
USA	Oct 20, 1998	Cassette x 2	23	Geffen/Universal	GEFC2-25308	720642530849	Clean Version	—	
USA	Nov 24, 1998	CD x 2	23	Geffen/Universal	GEFD2-25314	720642531426	Special Collector's Edition	—	embroidered cloth digipak
