= Big Ones You Can Look At =

1994 video album by Aerosmith

Video by Aerosmith
- Released: November 1, 1994
- Genre: Hard rock, glam metal
- Length: 60 mins
- Label: Geffen

Aerosmith chronology
The Making of Pump (1990)	Big Ones You Can Look At (1994)	You Gotta Move (2004)

Professional ratings
Review scores
Source	Rating
Allmusic	link

Big Ones You Can Look At is a VHS and LaserDisc featuring music videos by the American band Aerosmith. It was released on November 1, 1994. In addition, there are outtakes and band interviews. Running time is 100 minutes. The suggestive title comes from – and is a companion to – the 1994 compilation album Big Ones.

Some scenes from the Pump era were culled from the band's previous video compilation The Making of Pump. Along with the band members, various individuals make cameo appearances during the outtakes and making-of segments, including Marty Callner, John Kalodner, and Hank Azaria. The behind the scenes segment for "Eat the Rich" includes the band's collaboration with Melvin Liufau, Wesey Mamea, Liainaiala Tagaloa, Mapuhi T. Tekurio, and Aladd Alationa Teofilo, playing the log drums.

Among the notable actors appearing in the videos include: Alicia Silverstone, Liv Tyler, Edward Furlong, Stephen Dorff, Josh Holloway, Jason London, Brandi Brandt, Kristin Dattilo, Lesley Ann Warren, and Nicholas Guest.

== Track listing ==
1. Opening/meet the band
2. Official video: "Deuces Are Wild"
3. The making of the "Livin' on the Edge" video
4. Official video: "Livin' on the Edge"
5. Behind the scenes during the recording of "Eat the Rich"
6. Official video: "Eat the Rich"
7. The making of the "Cryin'" video
8. Official video: "Cryin'"
9. The making of the "Amazing" video
10. Official video: "Amazing"
11. The making of the "Crazy" video
12. Official video: "Crazy" (Director's cut)
13. Behind the scenes during the recording of "Love in an Elevator"
14. Official video: "Love in an Elevator"
15. Behind the scenes during the recording of "Janie's Got a Gun"
16. Official video: "Water Song/Janie's Got a Gun"
17. Official studio video: "What It Takes (The Recording Of)"
18. Outtakes - On tour
19. Official video: "Dulcimer Stomp/The Other Side"
20. Outtakes - Photo session
21. Official video: "Dude (Looks Like a Lady)"
22. Behind the scenes at the recording of The Simpsons ("Flaming Moe's" episode)
23. Official video: "Angel"
24. Outtakes - Men of the world
25. Official video: "Rag Doll"
26. Outtakes/End credits

== Certifications ==
Region	Certification	Certified units/sales
Argentina (CAPIF)	6× Platinum	48,000^{^}
Canada (Music Canada)	Platinum	10,000^{^}
United Kingdom (BPI)	Gold	25,000^{^}
United States (RIAA)	Gold	50,000^{^}
^{^} Shipments figures based on certification alone.

== Works cited ==
- Big Ones You Can Look At - VHS, 1994
- Discogs - Big Ones You Can Look At
