= Social effects of rock music =

The popularity and worldwide scope of rock music resulted in a powerful impact on society in the 20th century, particularly among the baby boomer generation. Rock and roll influenced daily life, fashion, social attitudes, and language in a way few other social developments have equated to. As the original generation of rock and roll fans matured, the music became an accepted and deeply interwoven thread in popular culture. Beginning in the early 1950s, rock songs began to be used in a few television commercials; within a decade, this practice became widespread, and rock music also featured in film and television program soundtracks. By the 1980s, rock music culture had become the dominant form of popular music culture in the United States and other Western countries, before seeing a decline in subsequent years.

== Race ==
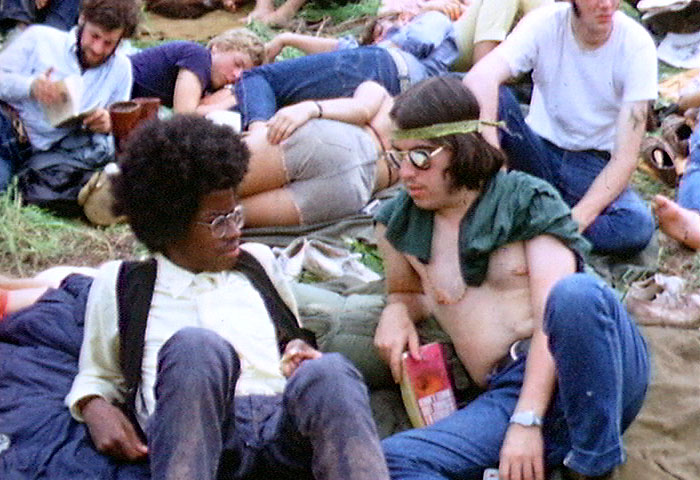
Attendees at Woodstock in Bethel, New York, in August 1969

In the crossover of African American "race music" to a growing white youth audience, the popularization of rock and roll involved both black performers reaching a white audience and white performers appropriating African-American music. Rock and roll appeared at a time when racial tensions in the United States were entering a new phase, with the beginnings of the civil rights movement for desegregation, leading to the Supreme Court ruling that abolished the policy of "separate but equal" in 1954, but leaving a policy which would be extremely difficult to enforce in parts of the United States.

The coming together of white youth audiences and black music in rock and roll provoked strong white racist reactions within the US, with many whites condemning its breaking down of barriers based on color. Many observers saw rock and roll as heralding the way for desegregation, in creating a new form of music that encouraged racial cooperation and shared experience. Many authors have argued that early rock and roll was instrumental in the way both white and black teenagers identified themselves.

== Sex and drugs ==
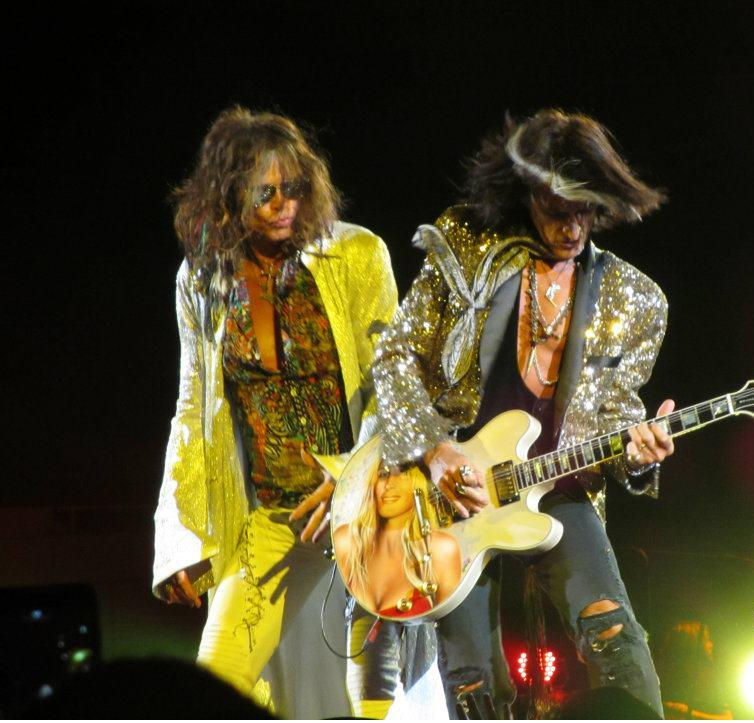
Steven Tyler and Joe Perry of Aerosmith performing in 2012. The duo became known as the "Toxic Twins" in the 1970s due to their heavy drug use. Both Tyler and Perry have battled serious drug addiction, with periods of relapse and sobriety.

The rock and roll lifestyle was popularly associated with sex and drugs. Many of rock and roll's early stars (as well as their jazz and blues counterparts) were known as hard-drinking, hard-living characters. During the 1960s the lifestyles of many stars became more publicly known, aided by the growth of the underground rock press. Musicians had always attracted the attention of "groupies" (girls who followed musicians) who spent time with and often performed sexual favors for band members.

As rock stars' lifestyles became more public, the popularity and promotion of recreational drug use by musicians may have influenced use of drugs and the perception of acceptability of drug use among the youth of the period. For example, when in the late 1960s the Beatles, who had previously been marketed as clean-cut youths, started publicly acknowledging using LSD, many fans followed. Journalist Al Aronowitz wrote "...whatever the Beatles did was acceptable, especially for young people."

In the late 1960s and early 1970s, much of the rock and roll cachet associated with drug use dissipated as rock music suffered a series of drug-related deaths, including the 27 Club-member deaths of Jimi Hendrix, Janis Joplin and Jim Morrison. Although some amount of drug use remained common among rock musicians, a greater respect for the dangers of drug consumption was observed, and many anti-drug songs became part of the rock lexicon, notably "The Needle and the Damage Done" by Neil Young (1972).

Many rock musicians, including John Lennon, Paul McCartney, Mick Jagger, Bob Dylan, Jerry Garcia, Stevie Nicks, Jimmy Page, Keith Richards, Bon Scott, Eric Clapton, Pete Townshend, Brian Wilson, Carl Wilson, Dennis Wilson, Steven Tyler, Scott Weiland, Sly Stone, Ozzy Osbourne, Mötley Crüe, Layne Staley, Kurt Cobain, Lemmy, Bobby Brown, Buffy Sainte Marie, Dave Matthews, David Crosby, Anthony Kiedis, Dave Mustaine, David Bowie, Richard Wright, Phil Rudd, Phil Anselmo, James Hetfield, Kirk Hammett, Joe Walsh, Julian Casablancas and others, have acknowledged battling addictions to many substances including alcohol, cocaine and heroin; many of these have successfully undergone drug rehabilitation programs, but others have died.

== Fashion ==
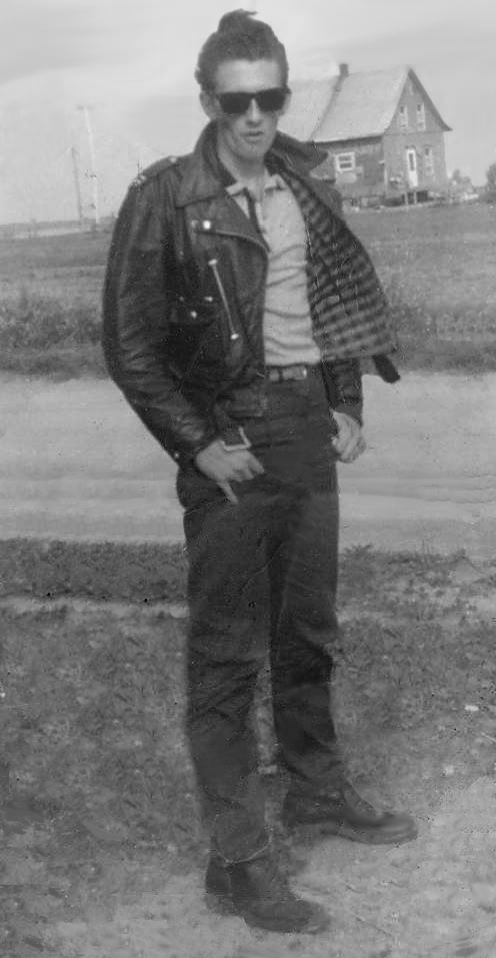
A man styling greaser fashion, 1960

Rock music and fashion have been inextricably linked. In the mid-1960s of the UK, rivalry arose between "mods" (who favoured 'modern' Italian-led fashion) and "rockers" (who wore motorcycle leathers), each style had their own favored musical acts. (The controversy would form the backdrop for the Who's rock opera Quadrophenia). In the 1960s, the Beatles brought mop-top haircuts, collarless blazers, and Beatle boots into fashion.

Rock musicians were also early adopters of hippie fashion and popularised such styles as long hair and the Nehru jacket. As rock music genres became more segmented, what an artist wore became more important in defining the artist. In the early 1970s, glam rock became widely influential featuring glittery fashions, high heels and camp. In the late 1970s, disco acts helped bring flashy urban styles to the mainstream, while punk groups began wearing mock-conservative attire (including suit jackets and skinny ties) in an attempt to be as unlike mainstream rock musicians, who still favored blue jeans and hippie-influenced clothes.

Heavy metal bands in the 1980s often favoured a strong visual image. For some bands, this consisted of leather or denim jackets and pants, spike/studs and long hair. Visual image was a strong component of the glam metal movement.

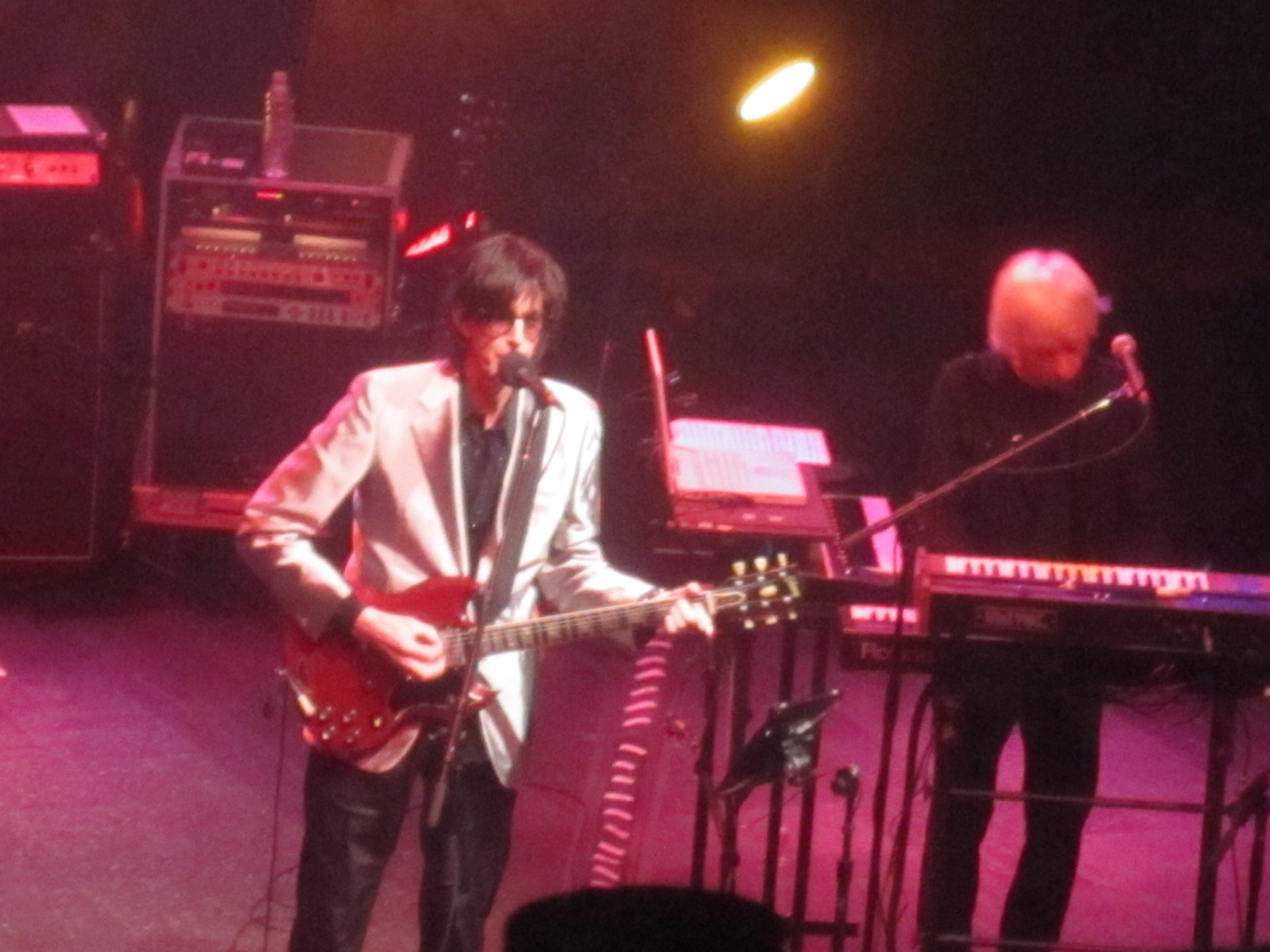
Ric Ocasek and Greg Hawkes of the Cars pictured in 2011. New wave fashion brought in a sleeker look to rock fashion during the early MTV era in the 1980s.

In 1981, MTV was formed, marking a large shift in the music world. The television company had an effect on fashion. With Madonna's iconic underwear-as-outerwear look and MTV featuring heavy metal, new wave and other genres, each artist's brand of fashion was given visibility.

In the early 1990s, the popularity of grunge brought in a fashion that included torn jeans, old shoes, flannel shirts, backward baseball hats and long hair against the clean-cut image that was popular at the time in heavily commercialized pop music culture.

Musicians continue to be fashion icons; pop-culture magazines such as Rolling Stone often include fashion layouts featuring musicians as models.

== Authenticity ==
Some rock musicians and fans have struggled with the concept of "selling out"—to be considered "authentic", rock music must keep a certain distance from the commercial world and its constructs; however it is widely believed that certain compromises must be made to become successful and to make music available to the public. This dilemma has created friction between musicians and certain fans, with some bands going to great lengths to avoid the appearance of "selling out" (while still finding ways to make a lucrative living). In some styles of rock, such as punk and heavy metal, a performer who is believed to have "sold out" to commercial interests may be labelled with the pejorative term "poseur".

If a performer first comes to public attention with one style, any further stylistic development may be seen as selling out to some long-time fans. On the other hand, managers and producers may progressively take more control of the artist, as happened, for instance, in Elvis Presley's swift transition in species from "The Hillbilly Cat" to "your teddy bear". It can be difficult to define the difference between seeking a wider audience and selling out. Ray Charles left behind his classic formulation of rhythm and blues to sing country music, pop songs and soft-drink commercials. In the process, he went from a niche audience to worldwide fame. Bob Dylan faced consternation from fans for embracing the electric guitar.

== Social activism ==
Love and peace were very common themes in rock music during the 1960s and 1970s. Rock musicians have often attempted to address social issues directly as commentary or as calls to action. During the Vietnam War the first rock protest songs were heard, inspired by the songs of folk musicians such as Woody Guthrie and Bob Dylan, which ranged from abstract evocations of peace (Peter, Paul and Mary's "If I Had a Hammer") to blunt anti-establishment diatribes (Crosby, Stills, Nash & Young's "Ohio"). Other musicians, notably John Lennon and Yoko Ono, were vocal in their anti-war sentiment both in their music and in public statements with songs such as "Imagine" and "Give Peace a Chance".

Famous rock musicians have adopted causes ranging from the environment (Marvin Gaye's "Mercy Mercy Me (The Ecology)") and the Anti-Apartheid Movement (Peter Gabriel's "Biko"), to violence in Northern Ireland (U2's "Sunday Bloody Sunday") and worldwide economic policy (the Dead Kennedys' "Kill the Poor"). Another notable protest song is Patti Smith's recording "People Have the Power". On occasion this involvement would go beyond simple songwriting and take the form of sometimes-spectacular concerts or televised events, often raising money for charity and awareness of global issues.

=== Live Aid concerts ===
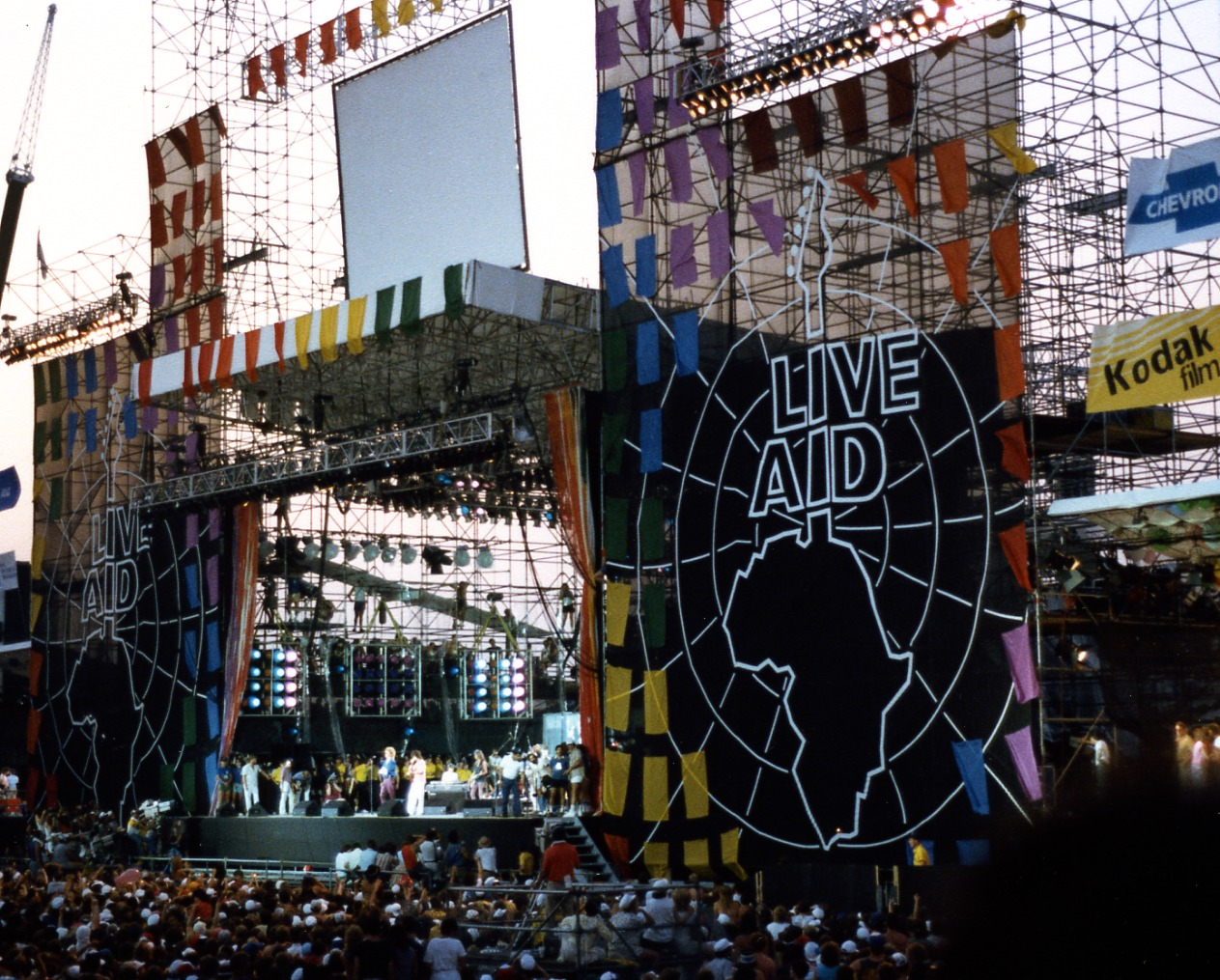
Live Aid at JFK Stadium, Philadelphia, 1985

Rock and roll as social activism reached a milestone in the Live Aid concerts, held July 13, 1985, which were an outgrowth of the 1984 charity single "Do They Know It's Christmas?" and became the largest musical concert in history with performers on two main stages, one in London, England, and the other in Philadelphia, USA (plus some other acts performing in other countries). The concert was televised worldwide and lasted 16 hours. The charity event raised millions of dollars for famine relief in Africa. Live Aid became a model for many other fund-raising and consciousness-raising efforts, including the Farm Aid concerts for family farmers in North America, and televised performances benefiting victims of the September 11 attacks. Live Aid itself was reprised in 2005 with the Live 8 concert to raise awareness of global economic policy. Environmental issues have also been a common theme, one example being Live Earth.

== Religion ==
The common usage of the term "rock god" acknowledges the quasi-religious quality of the adulation some rock stars receive. Songwriters like Pete Townshend have explored spirituality within their work. John Lennon became infamous, particularly in the United States, after he remarked in 1966 that The Beatles were "more popular than Jesus", with Beatles records being burned in public in some places in the South. However, he later said that this statement was misunderstood and not meant to be anti-Christian.

Iron Maiden, Metallica, Ozzy Osbourne, King Diamond, Alice Cooper, Led Zeppelin, Marilyn Manson, Slayer and numerous others have also been accused of being satanists, immoral or otherwise having an "evil" influence on their listeners. Anti-religious sentiments also appear in punk and hardcore. Criticism of Christianity and all religions is an important theme in anarcho-punk and crust punk.

=== Christianity ===
Christian rock, alternative rock, metal, punk, and hardcore are specific, identifiable genres of rock music with strong Christian overtones and influence. Many groups and individuals who are not considered to be Christian rock artists have religious beliefs themselves. For example; The Edge and Bono of U2 are a Methodist and an Anglican, respectively; Bruce Springsteen is a Roman Catholic; and Brandon Flowers of The Killers is a Latter Day Saint. Carlos Santana, Ted Nugent, and John Mellencamp are all other examples of rock stars who profess some form of Christian faith.

However, some conservative Christians single out the music genres of hip hop and rock as well as blues and jazz as containing jungle beats, or jungle music, and claim that it is a beat or musical style that is inherently evil, immoral, or sensual. Thus, according to them, any song in the rap, hip hop and rock genres is inherently evil because of the song's musical beat, regardless of the song's lyrics or message. A few even extend this analysis even to Christian rock songs.

Christian conservative author David Noebel is one of the most notable opponents of the existence of jungle beats. In his writings and speeches, Noebel held that the use of such beats in music was a communist plot to subvert the morality of the youth of the United States. Pope Benedict XVI was quoted as saying, according to the British Broadcasting Corporation, that "Rock... is the expression of the elemental passions, and at rock festivals it assumes a sometimes cultic character, a form of worship, in fact, in opposition to Christian worship."

=== Satanism ===
Some metal bands use demonic imagery for artistic and/or entertainment purposes, though many do not worship or believe in Satan. Ozzy Osbourne was reported to have been Anglican and Alice Cooper is a known born-again Christian. In some cases, though, metal performers have expressed satanic views. Numerous others in the early Norwegian black metal scene were Satanists. The most known example of this is Euronymous, who claimed that he worshiped Satan as a god. Varg Vikernes (back then called "the Count" or Grishnackh) has also been called a Satanist, even though he has rejected that label. Even within this localized musical subgenre, however, the arson attacks against Christian churches and other centers of worship were condemned by some prominent figures within the Norwegian black metal scene, such as Kjetil Manheim.
