= Blind Man (Aerosmith song) =

1994 single by Aerosmith

Single by Aerosmith

from the album Big Ones
- B-side: "Head First"
- Released: October 10, 1994
- Recorded: April and June 1994
- Studio: Power Station (New York City); Capri Digital (Capri, Italy)
- Length: 4:00
- Label: Geffen
- Songwriters: Steven Tyler; Joe Perry; Taylor Rhodes
- Producer: Michael Beinhorn

Aerosmith singles chronology
"Deuces Are Wild" (1994)	"Blind Man" (1994)	"Walk on Water" (1995)

Music video
- "Blind Man" on YouTube

"Blind Man" is a song by American hard rock band Aerosmith. The song was written by Steven Tyler, Joe Perry, and Taylor Rhodes. It was first released as a single in Australia on October 10, 1994. In the United Kingdom, it was issued later the same month as a double A-side with "Crazy".

"Blind Man" served as the first single from Aerosmith's Geffen-era compilation album, Big Ones, one of three songs from the record not previously released on any Aerosmith studio album. Despite the song's moderate success, reaching the top 10 in Canada, Finland, and Norway, the band rarely performed it live after the 1993–1994 Get a Grip Tour. The accompanying music video was directed by Marty Callner, featuring a cameo by Pamela Anderson.

== Recording ==
The song was recorded in two separate sessions. The first session took place at Power Station, New York City in April 1994, and was engineered by Adam Kasper with second engineering by Chris Albert. The second session took place at Capri Digital Studios, Capri, Italy in June, and was also engineered by Adam Kasper, but the second engineer on that session was Max Carola.

== Critical reception ==
Larry Flick from Billboard magazine wrote, "Eternally popular band offers a killer new track from its upcoming greates hits compilation Big Ones. Fans of recent hits like 'Crazy' and 'Amazing' will feast on this jam's delicious recipe of bluesy guitar riffs, grinding rock-ballad rhythms, and Steven Tyler's incomparable vocals. A bright sales and chart future appears more than likely." A reviewer from Music & Media commented, "A swollen ballad? Nothing new, huh? The novelty here is the fact that for the first time in a decade it isn't produced by Bruce Fairbairn, but by a man mostly active in alternative rock."

== Music video ==
The music video for the song was also one of the only songs from Aerosmith's Geffen era not released on the video collection Big Ones You Can Look At. The live performance portions of the video were filmed during the day at The Summit in Houston, Texas before Aerosmith's performance there on September 30, 1994. The video was directed by American director Marty Callner, and featured cameo appearances by Pamela Anderson and A&R man John Kalodner. In 2009, drummer Joey Kramer admitted on That Metal Show that this is his least favorite Aerosmith video.

== Track listing ==
No.	Title	Length
1.	"Blind Man" (LP version)	3:57
2.	"Shut Up and Dance" (live)	4:44
3.	"Get a Grip" (LP version)	3:58

== Charts ==
=== Weekly charts ===
Chart (1994)	Peak position
Australia (ARIA)	76
Belgium (Ultratop 50 Flanders)	38
Canada Top Singles (RPM)	5
Europe (Eurochart Hot 100) with "Crazy"	47
Europe (European Hit Radio)	21
Finland (Suomen virallinen lista) with "Crazy"	8
Germany (GfK)	89
Iceland (Íslenski Listinn Topp 40)	11
Netherlands (Single Top 100)	37
Norway (VG-lista)	9
Scottish Singles Sales (Official Charts) with "Crazy"	21
UK Singles (Official Charts) with "Crazy"	23
UK Rock & Metal (Official Charts) with "Crazy"	34
US Billboard Hot 100	48
US Mainstream Rock Airplay (Billboard)	3
US Pop Airplay (Billboard)	23
US Cash Box Top 100	35

=== Year-end charts ===
Chart (1995)	Position
Canada Top Singles (RPM)	65

== Release history ==
Region	Date	Format(s)	Label(s)	Ref.
Australia	October 10, 1994	CD; cassette	Geffen	
United Kingdom	October 24, 1994	CD; cassette	Geffen	
United States	November 1994	7-inch vinyl; cassette	Geffen	
Japan	November 2, 1994	Mini-CD	Geffen	
