= Walk on Water (Aerosmith song) =

Song by Aerosmith

"Walk On Water"

Single by Aerosmith

from the album Big Ones
- Released: 1995
- Recorded: 1994
- Genre: Hard rock
- Length: 4:55
- Label: Geffen
- Songwriters: Steven Tyler; Joe Perry; Jack Blades; Tommy Shaw
- Producers: Bruce Fairbairn; Michael Beinhorn

Aerosmith singles chronology
"Blind Man" (1994)	"Walk On Water" (1995)	"Nine Lives" (1997)

Music video
- "Walk on Water" on YouTube

"Walk On Water" is a song by American hard rock band Aerosmith. It was written by Steven Tyler, Joe Perry, Jack Blades, and Tommy Shaw. It was released in 1995 as the second single from 1994's Big Ones, a compilation album featuring 12 of Aerosmith's biggest hits from the Geffen-era, which included two new songs. It was the band's last single to be released by Geffen before they returned to Columbia Records.

The song's lyrical style, content and sound is in the vein of such songs as "Shut up and Dance", which was also written with the assistance of Blades/Shaw. It also features notable harmonica playing by Tyler, as well as dueling lead guitar parts, and a strong backbeat.

It reached No. 16 on the US Billboard Mainstream Rock Tracks chart and No. 11 in Latvia.

== Music video ==
A music video, produced to promote the single, features various clips of their past videos in the background as the band performs.

== Video game ==
This song was included in the 1995 video game Quest For Fame.

== Track listing ==
1. "Walk On Water" (LP Version)
2. "Deuces Are Wild" (LP Version)
3. "Line Up" (Smokey Bar Mix)

== Charts ==
Chart (1995)	Peak position
Australia (ARIA)	149
US Mainstream Rock (Billboard)	16
