= Eat the Rich (Aerosmith song) =

1993 song by Aerosmith

Single by Aerosmith

from the album Get a Grip
- B-side: "Head First"
- Released: June 1993
- Genre: Hard rock
- Length: 4:10
- Label: Geffen
- Songwriters: Steven Tyler; Joe Perry; Jim Vallance
- Producer: Bruce Fairbairn

Aerosmith singles chronology
"Livin' on the Edge" (1993)	"Eat the Rich" (1993)	"Fever" (1993)

Music video
- "Eat the Rich" on YouTube

"Eat the Rich" is a song by American rock band Aerosmith, written by Steven Tyler, Joe Perry, and Jim Vallance. It was released in June 1993 by Geffen Records as the second single from the band's 11th album, Get a Grip (1993). The song had success on US rock radio, peaking at number five on the Billboard Album Rock Tracks chart. In the United Kingdom, it peaked at number 34, while in Canada, it peaked at number 45.

The song quickly became a fan favorite and drew a rousing reaction from crowds when it was used as the band's opening song on the Get a Grip Tour. The band has played the song several times on the Route of All Evil Tour, despite being generally limited to a 13-song setlist. The song was included on the band's 1994 Geffen Records-era greatest hits album Big Ones as well as the first song on the live double-album A Little South of Sanity.

== Structure ==
On Get a Grip, the song is preceded by a 23-second track called "Intro" which features heavy bass, rapid, quasi-tribal drumming, a reversed chorus of "Eat the Rich", rapid-fire lyrics by Tyler, and a sample of Aerosmith's "Walk This Way" right at the end, before "Eat the Rich" starts. "Intro" also features a line from "F.I.N.E.*", a song from their previous album, Pump.

== Music video ==
The music video features footage shot at Soundtrack Studios in Boston, documentary footage of the band recording parts of the song in the studio at Longview Farm In Massachusetts, as well as behind the scenes footage form a photo shoot with photographer Wayne Maser in New York City. Elements such as eyeballs, skulls, horns, etc., were added to suggest the cannibalistic overtone of the song. The video was shot, directed and edited by Peter Martinez and Produced by Ellen Stanford and featured appearances from A&R icon John Kalodner, comedian Anthony Clark and WBCN radio dj Mark Parenteau.

== Track listing ==
No.	Title	Length
1.	"Eat the Rich" (LP version)	4:15
2.	"Fever" (LP version)	4:19
3.	"Head First"	5:05
4.	"Livin' on the Edge" (demo version)	5:08

== Charts ==
=== Weekly charts ===
Chart (1993)	Peak position
Australia (ARIA)	63
Canada Top Singles (RPM)	45
UK Singles (Official Charts)	34
UK Airplay (Music Week)	28
US Mainstream Rock (Billboard)	5

=== Year-end charts ===
Chart (1993)	Position
US Album Rock Tracks (Billboard)	19

== Release history ==
Region	Date	Format(s)	Label(s)	Ref.
Australia	June 1993	CD; cassette	Geffen	
United Kingdom	June 21, 1993	10-inch vinyl; CD; cassette	Geffen	
Japan	March 24, 1994	CD	Geffen	

== Covers and media ==
In addition to "Amazing," "Eat the Rich" is featured on Tecmo's Dead or Alive 4 video game opening. It was one of the looped songs on Revolution X, Aerosmith's game by Midway Games, but it was heard for a short time after playing. Foghat released a cover of "Honey Hush", back in 1974, with a similar intro guitar riff as the main riff in "Eat the Rich."
