= Crazy (Aerosmith song) =

1994 song by Aerosmith

Single by Aerosmith

from the album Get a Grip
- B-side: "Gotta Love It"
- Released: May 3, 1994
- Genre: Blues rock; glam metal
- Length: 5:16 (album version); 4:04 (single edit)
- Label: Geffen
- Songwriters: Steven Tyler; Joe Perry; Desmond Child
- Producer: Bruce Fairbairn

Aerosmith singles chronology
"Deuces Are Wild" (1994)	"Crazy" (1994)	"Shut Up and Dance" (1994)

Music video
- "Crazy'" on YouTube

"Crazy" is a song by American hard rock band Aerosmith and written by Steven Tyler, Joe Perry, and Desmond Child. It was the fifth single from their 1993 album Get a Grip, released in May 1994 by Geffen Records. "Crazy" peaked at number 17 on the US Billboard Hot 100, number three in Canada, and number one in Iceland for two weeks. In Finland and the United Kingdom, it was released as a double-A side with "Blind Man", reaching number eight in the former country and number 23 in the latter. Marty Callner directed the song's accompanying music video, featuring Liv Tyler and Alicia Silverstone.

== Composition ==
The song is set in A major and follows the 6/8 time signature. It was written earlier, around the same time as "Angel," but the band felt it had to "spread out their ballads to retain their rock image."

== Critical reception ==
Terry Staunton from Melody Maker said Aerosmith "go mando mondo on this syrupy Black Crowes pastiche". He added, "A last dance lecherous ballad with Steve Tyler giving us his best bad-ass drawl." Emma Cochrane from Smash Hits gave it two out of five, writing, "The fact that the video is ace is probably enough to make it a big hit, but the song itself is less inspiring. It has a nagging chorus and droning guitars. Still, the girl is classy."

== Music video ==
The music video for the song was directed by American director Marty Callner and received heavy rotation on MTV, being one of the channel's most requested videos of 1994. It featured the third appearance of Alicia Silverstone in the band's videos, and was the career debut of Steven's then 16-year-old daughter, Liv Tyler. The decision to cast Liv in the video for "Crazy" was based on the video's creators having seen her in a Pantene commercial. "I understand why people might have a problem with [the video's content]," she remarked. "But I have no problem with it, and Steven has no problem with it. And if other people have a problem with it, it's their problem."

The film-like video depicts Silverstone and Tyler as schoolgirls who skip class and run away, driving off in a 1993 black Ford Mustang GT convertible in a manner similar to the 1991 film Thelma & Louise. The two use their good looks to take advantage of a service station clerk and, needing money, enter an amateur pole-dancing competition. The video is edited to show the similarities in stage moves of Steven Tyler and daughter Liv. The girls win the dance competition, then spend the night in a motel. They continue their joyride the following day, where they encounter a young, sweaty and shirtless farmer (played by model Dean Kelly) aboard a tractor tilling land in the countryside. They persuade him to join them in their journey, where they all go skinny dipping in a lake. The girls take off with his clothes and leave him behind at the lake. Naked, he chases after them, and rejoins them in the convertible. The final seconds of the video show the word "Crazy" spelled out in cursive in the cropland by the still-running tractor as the farmer runs towards it and the girls drive off.

Jason London makes a short cameo at the end in a tag scene, reprising his character from the "Amazing" video.

=== Director's cut ===
A longer director's cut of the video appears on the compilation Big Ones You Can Look At. This version features a few more provocative clips, and a longer, more risque version of the pole-dancing competition scene. It also removes the scene in which the girls abandon the farmer after skinny-dipping with him. Both versions of the video include an extra reprise of the chorus which is not included on the album and radio versions.

== Accolades ==
The song earned the band a Grammy Award for Best Rock Performance by a Duo or Group with Vocal in 1994. This was the band's second Grammy win for Get a Grip and third overall. The video for "Crazy" was ranked number 23 on VH1's "Top 100 Music Videos of All Time".

== Track listing ==
No.	Title	Length
1.	"Crazy" (LP version)	5:17
2.	"Crazy" (orchestral)	5:30
3.	"Crazy" (acoustic)	5:39
4.	"Amazing" (orchestral)	5:56
5.	"Gotta Love It" (LP version)	5:58

== Charts ==
=== Weekly charts ===
Weekly chart performance for "Crazy"
Chart (1994–2011)	Peak position
Australia (ARIA)	127
Canada Top Singles (RPM)	3
Europe (European Hit Radio)	26
Germany (GfK)	43
Iceland (Íslenski Listinn Topp 40)	1
Israel (Israeli Singles Chart)	1
Netherlands (Dutch Top 40)	30
Netherlands (Single Top 100)	28
Poland (Polish Airplay New)	5
Switzerland (Schweizer Hitparade)	28
UK Airplay (Music Week)	31
US Billboard Hot 100	17
US Mainstream Rock Airplay (Billboard)	7
US Pop Airplay (Billboard)	7
US Cash Box Top 100	12

Weekly chart performance for "Crazy" / "Blind Man"
Chart (1994)	Peak position
Europe (Eurochart Hot 100)	47
Finland (Suomen virallinen lista)	8
Scottish Singles Sales (Official Charts)	21
UK Singles (Official Charts)	23
UK Rock & Metal (Official Charts)	34

=== Year-end charts ===
Year-end chart performance for "Crazy"
Chart (1994)	Position
Canada Top Singles (RPM)	30
Iceland (Íslenski Listinn Topp 40)	23
Israel (Israeli Singles Chart)	7
US Billboard Hot 100	68
US Cash Box Top 100	47

== Certifications ==
Certifications and sales for "Crazy"
Region	Certification	Certified units/sales
Brazil (Pro-Música Brasil)	Gold	30,000^{‡}
Italy (FIMI) Sales since 2009	Gold	50,000^{‡}
New Zealand (RMNZ)	Gold	15,000^{‡}
Spain (Promusicae)	Platinum	60,000^{‡}
United Kingdom (BPI) Sales since 2004	Silver	200,000^{‡}
^{‡} Sales+streaming figures based on certification alone.

== Release history ==
Release dates and formats for "Crazy"
Region	Date	Format(s)	Label(s)	Ref.
United States	May 3, 1994	7-inch vinyl; CD; cassette	Geffen	
Australia	May 23, 1994	CD; cassette	Geffen	
United Kingdom	October 24, 1994	CD; cassette	Geffen	

== Legacy ==
The song appeared on several compilations including Big Ones, A Little South of Sanity, O, Yeah! Ultimate Aerosmith Hits and Devil's Got a New Disguise. Despite bringing much success for the band in the mid-1990s, Aerosmith rarely performed it on tour until it was added to international shows on their 2007 World Tour due to overwhelming demand from fans. It was covered in Glee by Jacob Artist and Melissa Benoist, mashed up with Britney Spears' "(You Drive Me) Crazy".
