= The Beavis and Butt-Head Experience =

Compilation album by Various Artists
- Released: November 23, 1993
- Recorded: 1993
- Genres: Alternative rock, hard rock, heavy metal, hip-hop, funk rock, grunge, comedy
- Length: 59:27
- Label: Geffen
- Producer: Various

Singles from Beavis and Butt-Head Experience
- 1. "I Got You Babe" Released: November 29, 1993; 2. "Come To Butt-Head" Released: 1994 (EU)

Professional ratings
Review scores
Source	Rating
AllMusic	3/5 stars
Calgary Herald	B
Music Week	4/5 stars
NME	3/10
Select	1/5 medals

The Beavis and Butt-Head Experience is a compilation album released in 1993 by Geffen Records and related to the animated television series Beavis and Butt-Head. The name is a reference to Jimi Hendrix's original band, the Jimi Hendrix Experience. It is one of the best-selling comedy albums and has sold 1,610,000 units as of May 2014. It was certified double platinum by the RIAA in the United States.

== Overview ==
The album features genres of hard rock, heavy metal, and hip-hop. Many of the songs are intercut with commentary by Beavis and Butt-Head. They are joined by Cher on a cover of "I Got You Babe", the music video which featured Beavis and Butt-Head meeting a live-action Cher via computer-generated imagery. Beavis and Butt-Head also performed the slow jam "Come to Butt-Head". "Looking Down the Barrel of a Gun" (a Beastie Boys cover performed by Anthrax) starts with a skit in which Beavis and Butt-Head meet the members of Anthrax in their tour bus.

The album contains a hidden track. After a period of silence following "I Got You Babe", a reprise of "Come to Butt-Head" starts at 5:08, in which Beavis and Butt-Head are joined by rapper Positive K.

"I Got You Babe" with Cher was released as a single internationally and had chart success in Australia, Belgium, Denmark, Europe, Netherlands, Sweden, US and the UK and featured a music video which would rotate on MTV and MTV Europe. The song "Come to Butt-Head" was also released as a single in Germany.

In 2016, the album was reissued as a vinyl picture disc.

== Liner notes ==
The album's liner notes featured drawings of Beavis and Butt-Head adapted as a variety of other characters, including hippies, old women, Hasidic Jews, and Captain Picard and Commander Riker of the television series Star Trek: The Next Generation.

"I Got You Babe"
The song features guitar strings, different from the original.

The title of the track "Mental Masturbation" by Jackyl is censored on the track listing, appearing as "Mental *@%#!" on the inner liner notes and "Mental ★@%#!" on the back cover.

== Track listing ==
No.	Title	Performed by	Length
1.	"I Hate Myself and Want to Die"	Nirvana	4:02
2.	"Looking Down the Barrel of a Gun" (Originally performed by Beastie Boys)	Anthrax	7:43
3.	"Come to Butt-Head"	Beavis and Butt-Head (Mike Judge)	3:52
4.	"99 Ways to Die"	Megadeth	4:11
5.	"Bounce"	Run–D.M.C.	6:48
6.	"Deuces Are Wild"	Aerosmith	3:50
7.	"I Am Hell"	White Zombie	5:01
8.	"Poetry and Prose"	Primus	3:48
9.	"Monsta Mack"	Sir Mix-a-Lot	4:05
10.	"Search and Destroy" (Originally performed by The Stooges)	Red Hot Chili Peppers	4:12
11.	"Mental Masturbation"	Jackyl	2:38
12.	"I Got You Babe*"	Cher with Beavis and Butt-Head	9:23
Total length:			60:00

[*] Contains the hidden track "Come to Butt-Head (Reprise)" by Beavis and Butt-Head featuring Positive K at 5:08.

== Charts ==
Chart (1993–94)	Peak position
Australian Hit Seekers Albums (ARIA)	11
Austrian Albums (Ö3 Austria)	17
Canada Top Albums/CDs (RPM)	40
European Top 100 Albums (Music & Media)	67
German Albums (Offizielle Top 100)	35
Swiss Albums (Schweizer Hitparade)	36
US Billboard 200	5
US Top 100 Pop Albums (Cashbox)	8

== Certifications ==
Region	Certification	Certified units/sales
Canada (Music Canada)	Platinum	100,000^{^}
United States (RIAA)	2× Platinum	2,000,000^{^}
^{^} Shipments figures based on certification alone.
