= Deuces Are Wild =

1994 single by Aerosmith

Single by Aerosmith

from the album Big Ones and The Beavis and Butt-Head Experience
- Written: 1988
- Released: 1994
- Length: 3:35
- Label: Geffen
- Songwriters: Steven Tyler; Jim Vallance
- Producer: Bruce Fairbairn

Aerosmith singles chronology
"Amazing" (1994)	"Deuces Are Wild" (1994)	"Crazy" (1994)

Music video
- "Deuces Are Wild" on YouTube

"Deuces Are Wild" is a song by American rock band Aerosmith. It was written by lead singer Steven Tyler and professional songwriter Jim Vallance. It was originally considered for inclusion on Aerosmith's Pump album in 1989.

The song eventually surfaced as a track on the compilation album The Beavis and Butt-Head Experience in late 1993 and was released as a promotional single in early 1994. That was followed by a subsequent inclusion on the compilation album Big Ones in November 1994. The single was successful on North American radio, topping the US Billboard Album Rock Tracks chart for four weeks and reaching number 25 in Canada.

== Background ==
Vallance wrote the music for the song in 1988 and recorded a demo in his home studio. The demo was sent to the band on a cassette that included other potential Aerosmith songs, including "The Other Side". According to Vallance, Geffen A&R rep John Kalodner liked the music and Tyler's lyrics, but did not like the song's title. Vallance and Tyler refused to change it, and Kalodner responded by nixing the song from Pump. Vallance noted that he believed that the released version was simply his home demo with overdubs by Tyler, Joe Perry, and Joey Kramer, rather than being a complete Aerosmith recording.

== Music video ==
A music video was created for the song, featuring random clips of the band, and released on the Big Ones companion video release Big Ones You Can Look At.

== Charts ==
=== Weekly charts ===
Chart (1994)	Peak position
Canada Top Singles (RPM)	25
US Mainstream Rock (Billboard)	1

=== Year-end charts ===
Chart (1994)	Position
US Album Rock Tracks (Billboard)	9
