= Get a Grip =

Studio album by Aerosmith
- Released: April 20, 1993
- Recorded: January–February, September–November 1992
- Studios: A&M, Los Angeles; Little Mountain Sound, Vancouver, Canada
- Genres: Hard rock; pop metal
- Length: 62:06
- Label: Geffen
- Producer: Bruce Fairbairn

Aerosmith chronology
Pump (1989)	Get a Grip (1993)	Nine Lives (1997)

Singles from Get a Grip
- 1. "Livin' on the Edge" Released: March 1993; 2. "Eat the Rich" Released: June 1993 (UK); 3. "Cryin'" Released: June 1993 (US); 4. "Amazing" Released: November 1993; 5. "Crazy" Released: May 1994; 6. "Shut Up and Dance" Released: June 1994 (UK)

Get a Grip is the eleventh studio album by American rock band Aerosmith, released in April 1993 by Geffen Records. Get a Grip was the band's last studio album to be released by Geffen before they returned to Columbia Records.

Get a Grip featured guests including Don Henley, who sang backup on "Amazing", and Lenny Kravitz, who offered backup vocals and collaboration to "Line Up". As on Permanent Vacation and Pump, this album featured numerous song collaborators from outside the band including: Desmond Child, Jim Vallance, Mark Hudson, Richie Supa, Taylor Rhodes, Jack Blades, and Tommy Shaw.

Get a Grip became Aerosmith's best-selling studio album worldwide, achieving sales of over 20 million copies. The album became the band's first album to reach number one in the United States and tied with Pump for their second best-selling album in the US, selling over 7 million copies as of 1995 (Toys in the Attic leads with nine million). This also made it their third consecutive album with U.S. sales of at least five million. Two songs from the album won Grammy Awards for Best Rock Performance by a Duo or Group with Vocal, in 1993 and 1994. The album was voted Album of the Year by Metal Edge readers in the magazine's 1993 Readers' Choice Awards, while "Livin' on the Edge" was voted Best Video.

== Production ==
The album originally had 12 songs and was scheduled to be released in the third quarter of 1992, but Geffen A&R executive John Kalodner listened to what had been recorded and thought it lacked variety and a radio-friendly song, so the band went back to write more songs with collaborators such as Child. It was also the last album Bruce Fairbairn produced for Aerosmith before his death in 1999.

Regarding songs that reflect on the band's history with drug abuse such as "Get a Grip" and "Amazing", Steven Tyler declared: "We were saying you can point it back to some of those old beliefs about the crossroads and signing up with the devil, that you can look at the drugs as that: It can be fun in the beginning but then it comes time to pay your debt, and if you're not sharp enough to see that it's taking you down, then it really will get you."

Many songs were written and recorded for the album that were either used as B-sides or never released. "Don't Stop" and "Head First" were released as B-sides, as well as "Can't Stop Messin'", which also appears on several special editions of the album as an addition in the track list. Alternate versions of other songs recorded during the sessions including "Deuces Are Wild", "Lizard Love", "Devil's Got a New Disguise", and "Legendary Child" have since been released on various albums and soundtracks.

Other songs were listed on the official Aerosmith website in the late 1990s. "Black Cherry", "Dime Store Lover", "Meltdown", "Rocket 88", "Wham Bam", and "Yo Momma" were listed on the lyrics page of the website. In 2005, Kalodner confirmed the existence of several of these songs, as well as "Trouble", "Strange", "13", and "Keep on Movin'". "Deuces Are Wild" was possibly recorded again during these sessions. Several songs are also listed on copyright repertoires, including "Ain't Gonna Break My Heart", "Good Thang", and "Jake". These songs can be traced to the year 1991.

=== Cover art ===
Get a Grip's cover art, depicting an image of a cow with a captive bead nipple ring through its udder and a brand of the Aerosmith logo, was designed by noted album-cover artist Hugh Syme. Music critic Steven Hyden has referred to the album's cover art as "the worst album cover ever", expressing surprise that Syme was responsible for it given his other work. An animal-rights group objected to the cover art, but the band confirmed the image had been digitally altered and did not depict an actual act of animal cruelty.

A special edition of the album was released in a fabric-covered case made to resemble cowhide.

== First digital download ==
On June 27, 1994, Aerosmith became the first major artist to release a song as an exclusive digital download, making "Head First" available as a 4-megabyte WAV file to CompuServe subscribers. Around 10,000 users downloaded the song in the first few days, even though at the time, most users accessed the service with a modem, meaning the download would have taken the better part of an hour. "Head First" was earlier used as the B-side for "Eat the Rich".

== Critical reception ==
Professional ratings
Review scores
Source	Rating
AllMusic	2.5/5 stars
Calgary Herald	A−
Christgau's Consumer Guide	A−
Collector's Guide to Heavy Metal	9/10
The Encyclopedia of Popular Music	4/5 stars
Entertainment Weekly	C
The Great Rock Discography	7/10
New Musical Express	4/10
Q	3/5 stars
Rolling Stone	3/5 stars

Reviewing for Rolling Stone in 1993, Mark Coleman said he enjoyed the title song and compared the introductory track to the band's 1986 rendition of "Walk This Way" with Run–D.M.C. However, he found much of the rest unadventurous and too "somber", negatively comparing "Livin' on the Edge" to a Bon Jovi song, and lamenting the outside contributions from songwriters and collaborators. Ultimately, Coleman determined that, "for a spirited half-hour or so, Aerosmith pretty much gets over on sheer awe-inspiring technique". Stephen Dalton of New Musical Express agreed on the unusual seriousness of the themes and lyrics ("as serious as brain-blasted hedonists with platinum-plated limos can get") and pondered on the many collaborations, which "suggests Perry and Tyler seem unsure how much talent remains in the well". Robert Christgau was more positive in a contemporary review for Playboy, saying that while it "occasionally exploits their rap connection", remains faithful to Aerosmith's template of "fast ones and slow ones; lyrically it's fuck me and fuck you", but with such superpro crunch and commitment that no good-timing headbanger will give a shit. Christgau highlighted "Cryin'" as "the classic" on the album, while saying that "the closest thing to a duff cut [is] the 'meaningful 'Livin' on the Edge', which could be a hit anyway." He later ranked it 64th on his "Dean's List" accompanying The Village Voice's annual Pazz & Jop critics poll of the year's best albums, and assigned it an A-minus in his 2000 book Christgau's Consumer Guide: Albums of the '90s.

Modern reviews are equally mixed. Stephen Thomas Erlewine of AllMusic wrote that "Get a Grip pales against its predecessor's musical diversity" and lamented a lack of spontaneity, resulting in "a studied performance" where "there isn't much beneath the surface." Martin Popoff instead described Get a Grip as "a bounty of mostly strong, always professional and well-intentioned mini-suites, a record with nothing resembling a central thrust, except perhaps that unforgettable Aerosmith lust for life." In their 2009 book Encyclopedia of Heavy Metal Music, authors Brian Cogan and William Phillips considered the album to be a continuation of the commercially successful formula Aerosmith had found beginning with 1987's Permanent Vacation, saying, "while some fans of the band missed the raw immediacy of the group’s classic seventies work, there was no doubt that the input of professional songwriters had helped the band to find new commercial success, even as it somewhat dulled the band’s former hard rock edge". In his 2025 book Aerosmith: Every Album, Every Song, author Andrew Rooney wrote that choosing to stick to their recent formula for Get a Grip was a bold move, due to the rise in popularity of alternative rock between the release of 1989's Pump and Get a Grip.

== Track listing ==
Get a Grip track listing
No.	Title	Writer(s)	Length
1.	"Intro"	Steven Tyler, Joe Perry, Jim Vallance	0:24
2.	"Eat the Rich"	Tyler, Perry, Vallance	4:11
3.	"Get a Grip"	Tyler, Perry, Vallance	3:59
4.	"Fever"	Tyler, Perry	4:15
5.	"Livin' on the Edge"	Tyler, Perry, Mark Hudson	6:07
6.	"Flesh"	Tyler, Perry, Desmond Child	5:57
7.	"Walk On Down"	Perry	3:39
8.	"Shut Up and Dance"	Tyler, Perry, Jack Blades, Tommy Shaw	4:56
9.	"Cryin'"	Tyler, Perry, Taylor Rhodes	5:09
10.	"Gotta Love It"	Tyler, Perry, Hudson	5:58
11.	"Crazy"	Tyler, Perry, Child	5:14
12.	"Line Up"	Tyler, Perry, Lenny Kravitz	4:03
13.	"Amazing"	Tyler, Richard Supa	5:57
14.	"Boogie Man" (instrumental)	Tyler, Perry, Vallance	2:17
Total length:			62:06

International and limited editions
No.	Title	Writer(s)	Length
13.	"Can't Stop Messin'"	Tyler, Perry, Blades, Shaw	3:30
Total length:			65:36

Japanese Reissue 2025 (SHM-CD)
No.	Title	Writer(s)	Length
16.	"Don't Stop"	Tyler, Perry, Vallance	4:07
Total length:			69:53

- Immediately after "Amazing", a snippet of "Who Threw the Whiskey in the Well", by Lucky Millinder, is heard as if being tuned in on an old radio. Tyler says, "So from all of us at Aerosmith to all of you out there, wherever you are, remember: the light at the end of the tunnel may be you. Good night." The music then fades out.

== Personnel ==
Aerosmith

- Steven Tyler – lead vocals, keyboards, mandolin, harmonica, additional percussion, arranger
- Joe Perry – guitar, backing vocals, lead vocals on "Walk On Down"
- Brad Whitford – guitar, lead guitar on “Fever”, “Gotta Love It”, and “Flesh”
- Tom Hamilton – bass guitar, bass solo on “Gotta Love It”
- Joey Kramer – drums

Additional personnel

- David Campbell – orchestra arrangements on "Crazy" and "Amazing"
- Desmond Child – keyboards on "Crazy"
- John Webster – keyboards
- Richard Supa – keyboards on "Amazing"
- Don Henley – background vocals on "Amazing"
- Lenny Kravitz – background vocals on "Line Up"
- Paul Baron – trumpet
- Tom Keenlyside – saxophone
- Bruce Fairbairn – trumpet, production
- Ian Putz – baritone saxophone
- Bob Rogers – trombone
- Liainaiala Tagaloa – log drums on "Eat the Rich"
- Mapuhi T. Tekurio – log drums on "Eat the Rich"
- Aladd Alationa Teofilo – log drums on "Eat the Rich"
- Melvin Liufau – log drums on "Eat the Rich"
- Wesey Mamea – log drums on "Eat the Rich"
- Sandy Kanaeholo – log drums on "Eat the Rich"

Production

- Engineers – John Aguto, Ed Korengo, Ken Lomas, Mike Plotnikoff, David Thoener, Karl Heilbron
- Pre Production Engineer – Tony Lentini
- Mixing – Brendan O'Brien
- Mastering – Greg Fulginiti at Masterdisk
- Mastering Supervisor – David Donnelly
- Programming – John Webster
- Production coordination – Debra Shallman
- Guitar technician – Dan Murphy
- Art direction – Michael Golob
- Cover design – Hugh Syme
- Photography – Edward Colver, William Hames
- John Kalodner – John Kalodner

== Charts ==
=== Weekly charts ===
Weekly chart performance for Get a Grip
Chart (1993–1994)	Peak position
Australian Albums (ARIA)	3
Austrian Albums (Ö3 Austria)	3
Canadian Albums (RPM)	2
Dutch Albums (Album Top 100)	2
Finnish Albums (Suomen virallinen lista)	1
French Albums (InfoDisc)	24
German Albums (Offizielle Top 100)	3
Hungarian Albums (MAHASZ)	7
Italian Albums (Musica e Dischi)	17
Japanese Albums (Oricon)	7
New Zealand Albums (RMNZ)	9
Norwegian Albums (VG-lista)	3
Scottish Albums (Official Charts)	43
Spanish Albums (AFYVE)	10
Swedish Albums (Sverigetopplistan)	3
Swiss Albums (Schweizer Hitparade)	1
UK Albums (Official Charts)	2
UK Rock & Metal Albums (Official Charts)	13
US Billboard 200	1

=== Year-end charts ===
1993 year-end chart performance for Get a Grip
Chart (1993)	Position
Austrian Albums (Ö3 Austria)	17
Dutch Albums (Album Top 100)	80
German Albums (Offizielle Top 100)	25
Spanish Albums (AFYVE)	33
Swiss Albums (Schweizer Hitparade)	21
UK Albums (OCC)	83
US Billboard 200	14

1994 year-end chart performance for Get a Grip
Chart (1994)	Position
Austrian Albums (Ö3 Austria)	5
Dutch Albums (Album Top 100)	11
German Albums (Offizielle Top 100)	6
Swiss Albums (Schweizer Hitparade)	5
US Billboard 200	21

== Certifications and sales ==
Certifications and sales for Get a Grip
Region	Certification	Certified units/sales
Argentina (CAPIF)	3× Platinum	180,000^{^}
Australia (ARIA)	Gold	35,000^{^}
Austria (IFPI Austria)	Platinum	50,000^{*}
Belgium (BRMA)	Platinum	50,000^{*}
Brazil (Pro-Música Brasil)	Gold	100,000^{*}
Canada (Music Canada)	Diamond	1,000,000^{^}
Chile	Platinum	25,000
Denmark (IFPI Danmark)	3× Platinum	60,000^{‡}
Finland (Musiikkituottajat)	Gold	33,759
France (SNEP)	Gold	100,000^{*}
Germany (BVMI)	Platinum	738,000
Hong Kong (IFPI Hong Kong)	Gold	10,000^{*}
Indonesia	Gold	25,000
Israel	Gold	20,000
Japan (RIAJ)	2× Platinum	425,000
Mexico (AMPROFON)	Gold	100,000^{^}
Netherlands (NVPI)	Platinum	100,000^{^}
New Zealand (RMNZ)	Gold	7,500^{^}
Norway (IFPI Norway)	Platinum	50,000^{*}
Philippines (PARI)	Platinum	40,000^{*}
Poland (ZPAV)	Gold	50,000^{*}
Portugal (AFP)	Platinum	40,000^{^}
Spain (Promusicae)	Platinum	100,000^{^}
Sweden (GLF)	Platinum	100,000^{^}
Switzerland (IFPI Switzerland)	Gold	25,000^{^}
Taiwan (RIT)	Gold	25,000
Thailand	Gold	25,000
United Kingdom (BPI)	Platinum	300,000^{^}
United States (RIAA)	7× Platinum	7,000,000^{^}
^{*} Sales figures based on certification alone.^{^} Shipments figures based on certification alone.^{‡} Sales+streaming figures based on certification alone.

== Awards ==
Grammy Awards

Year	Winner	Category
1993	"Livin' on the Edge"	Best Rock Performance by a Duo or Group with Vocal
1994	"Crazy"	Best Rock Performance by a Duo or Group with Vocal

Metal Edge Readers' Choice Awards

Year	Winner	Category
1993	Get a Grip	Album of the Year
1993	"Livin' on the Edge"	Best video

== See also ==
- Get a Grip Tour

== Bibliography ==
- Huxley, Martin (2015). Aerosmith: The Fall and the Rise of Rock's Greatest Band. St. Martin's Publishing Group. ISBN 978-1250096531.
