= What It Takes (Aerosmith song) =

1990 single by Aerosmith

Single by Aerosmith

from the album Pump
- B-side: "Monkey on My Back"
- Released: February 26, 1990
- Genre: Country; soft rock
- Length: 6:28 (album version with hidden track); 5:11 (single version)
- Label: Geffen
- Songwriters: Steven Tyler; Joe Perry; Desmond Child
- Producer: Bruce Fairbairn

Aerosmith singles chronology
| "Janie's Got a Gun" (1989) | "What It Takes" (1990) | "The Other Side" (1990) |

Music video
- "What It Takes" on YouTube

"What It Takes" is a song by American rock band Aerosmith. Written by Steven Tyler, Joe Perry, and Desmond Child, the power ballad was released in February 1990 as the third single from their 10th album, Pump (1989). "I'll put some ballads on an album," Tyler remarked, "if that's what it takes so that some young kid can get to hear a 'Young Lust' or 'F.I.N.E.*'." "What It Takes" gave Aerosmith their second number-one single on the US Billboard Album Rock Tracks chart and finished 1990 as that chart's most successful single.

== Background ==
Child had co-written the power ballad "Angel" for Aerosmith's previous album, but the band wanted to make sure that its own identity was reflected in "What It Takes." According to Perry "It started off sounding really county-western. We didn't want to write a song like 'Angel,' and for Desmond, that's where his heart and soul is. He's into big, dramatic ballads. But we wanted to do something different." Aerosmith guitarist Brad Whitford stated that "It was a keyboard song to begin with. Somewhere along the line we knew it was special, so it had to be approached in a different manner." Perry went on to say that "The thing that made it for me was when [Fairbairn] put an accordion on it. That gave it the flavor it needed. Otherwise it would have just been nice chords and nice changes."

== Lyrics and music ==
The lyrics to "What It Takes" are about getting over a past relationship and the resulting hurt feelings. Lyrics in the song reference two other Aerosmith songs: F.I.N.E.*, also featured on the Pump album; and "Heart's Done Time", featured on the band's previous album, Permanent Vacation.

== Music video ==
There are two videos for the song. One, directed by Wayne Isham, features the band performing in the Longhorn Ballroom in the middle of a brawl. The other, directed by Keith Garde and Martin Torgoff, is culled from scenes from The Making of Pump, a film which documented the recording process of the Pump album. The latter received much greater airplay, and was also the version the band chose to include on their video collection Big Ones You Can Look At.

== Charts ==
=== Weekly charts ===
| Chart (1990) | Peak position |
|---|---|
| Australia (ARIA) | 46 |
| Canada Top Singles (RPM) | 15 |
| New Zealand (Recorded Music NZ) | 19 |
| US Billboard Hot 100 | 9 |
| US Album Rock Tracks (Billboard) | 1 |
| US Cash Box Top 100 | 8 |

=== Year-end charts ===
| Chart (1990) | Position |
|---|---|
| US Billboard Hot 100 | 91 |
| US Album Rock Tracks (Billboard) | 1 |
