= Janie's Got a Gun =

1989 single by Aerosmith

Single by Aerosmith

from the album Pump
- B-side: "Voodoo Medicine Man"
- Released: November 8, 1989
- Genre: Glam metal; hard rock; psychedelic rock; psychedelic pop
- Length: 5:38 (album version with "Water Song" instrumental intro); 5:28 (single edit); 4:16 (clean radio version)
- Label: Geffen
- Songwriters: Steven Tyler; Tom Hamilton
- Producer: Bruce Fairbairn

Aerosmith singles chronology
"F.I.N.E.*" (1989)	"Janie's Got a Gun" (1989)	"What It Takes" (1990)

Audio sample
- file; help

Music video
- "Janie's Got a Gun" on YouTube

"Janie's Got a Gun" is a song by American rock band Aerosmith and written by Steven Tyler and Tom Hamilton. The song was released as the second single from Pump in November 1989. The song describes a young woman killing her sexually abusive father.

"Janie's Got a Gun" peaked at number four on the US Billboard Hot 100 chart and number two on the Billboard Album Rock Tracks chart in 1990. In Australia, the song reached number one, becoming Aerosmith's first of two number-one singles there. It also reached number two in Canada, number 12 in Sweden, and number 13 in New Zealand. It won the band a 1990 Grammy Award for Best Rock Performance by a Duo or Group with Vocal.

== Song structure ==
On the album, "Janie's Got a Gun" is preceded by a 10-second instrumental called "Water Song", which features the work of instrumentalist Randy Raine-Reusch, who uses a glass harmonica, wind gong, and bullroarers to produce the special effects heard at the start of the song.

== Background and writing ==
Tyler came up with the main riff using a low-tone setting on his keyboard. Hamilton created the bassline. The guitars and drum parts were configured later and Tyler wrote the lyrics. The guitar solo, by Joe Perry, is accompanied by the main riff and rhythmic clapping. The song also uses the Slap Bass instrument patch from the Korg M1. In a 1994 interview with Rolling Stone, Tyler described the origin of the song:

I wrote the song in my basement, just fucking around. "Oh, Janie's got a gun." I got goose pimples. I sat for months, waiting for the oracle door to open. Then I looked over at a Time magazine and saw this article on 48 hours, minute by minute, of handgun deaths in the United States. Then I got off on the child abuse angle. I'd heard this woman speaking about how many children are attacked by their mothers and fathers. It was fucking scary. I felt, man, I gotta sing about this.

Tyler took nine months to complete the lyrics, which were also inspired by stories he heard while undergoing drug rehabilitation from another addict who turned to drugs after being abused by her father. He explains, "In the 1980s I was in a recovery program where I met so many women who had experienced incredibly painful and debilitating sexual, mental and physical abuse. Those events put them on a path of suffering that led to anything from abusing drugs to self-harm to many other self-destructive behaviors to mask the pain. It was also around that time that I wrote the song "Janie's Got a Gun," which tells the story of a young girl who is abused by her father." The singer declared, "I got really angry that nobody was paying homage to those who were abused by mom and dad." The line "He jacked a little bitty baby" was originally "He raped a little bitty baby," but Geffen Records A&R executive John Kalodner argued that the band should change it, explaining that he felt the song had the potential to be a hit and was certain it would not get played on commercial radio with the word "rape" in it. Tyler often sings the original line when performing live. In addition, the line "...and put a bullet in his brain" was changed to "...she left him in the pouring rain" for the radio version, making the song sound less graphic than it actually was.

== Music video ==
The music video was directed by David Fincher. Janie is portrayed by actress Kristin Dattilo. Her parents are played by Nicholas Guest and Lesley Ann Warren.

== Janie's Fund ==
In 2015, Tyler started a charity, Janie's Fund, which raises funds to provide counseling, trauma care, housing and medical care to troubled young women. Tyler explains, "Over the 30 years since that song was released, I've often thought about what could be done to prevent this kind of abuse."

== Charts ==
=== Weekly charts ===
Chart (1989–1990)	Peak position
Australia (ARIA)	1
Canada Top Singles (RPM)	2
Canada Retail Sales (RPM)	7
Italy Airplay (Music & Media)	16
New Zealand (Recorded Music NZ)	13
Sweden (Sverigetopplistan)	12
UK Singles (Official Charts)	76
US Billboard Hot 100	4
US Mainstream Rock Airplay (Billboard)	2
US Cash Box Top 100	3

=== Year-end charts ===
Chart (1990)	Position
Australia (ARIA)	19
Canada Top Singles (RPM)	31
US Billboard Hot 100	61

== Certifications ==
Region	Certification	Certified units/sales
Australia (ARIA)	Platinum	70,000^{^}
New Zealand (RMNZ)	Gold	15,000^{‡}
^{^} Shipments figures based on certification alone.^{‡} Sales+streaming figures based on certification alone.
