= Livin' on the Edge =

1993 single by Aerosmith

Single by Aerosmith

from the album Get a Grip
- B-side: "Don't Stop"; "Can't Stop Messin'"
- Released: March 1993
- Length: 6:07 (album version); 6:21 (full version); 5:41 (CHR edit)
- Label: Geffen
- Songwriters: Steven Tyler; Joe Perry; Mark Hudson
- Producer: Bruce Fairbairn

Aerosmith singles chronology
"Sweet Emotion" (reissue) (1991)	"Livin' on the Edge" (1993)	"Eat the Rich" (1993)

Music video
- "Livin' on the Edge" on YouTube

Alternative cover
- Strictly limited edition

"Livin' on the Edge" is a song by American hard rock band Aerosmith. The song was written by Steven Tyler, Joe Perry, and Mark Hudson. It was released in March 1993 by Geffen Records as the first single from the band's commercially successful eleventh album, Get a Grip (1993). The single reached number 18 on the US Billboard Hot 100 chart and number one on the Billboard Album Rock Tracks chart, where it remained for nine weeks. In the United Kingdom, the song peaked at number 19 on the UK Singles Chart in April 1993.

== Background ==
According to the band's autobiography Walk This Way, the song was partially inspired by the 1992 Los Angeles riots. Tyler also stated it was partially inspired by John Lennon's peace messages. Tyler also mentions in the book that the song features the sound of a bass drum he stole from his high school; four loud beats are heard from that drum in a pause between the final verse and chorus.

== Music video ==
The music video for "Livin' on the Edge" was directed by American director Marty Callner and features actor Edward Furlong. It depicts vandalism, grand theft auto, joyriding, airbag crashing, unprotected sex, violence among school-aged youth, cross-dressing teachers, a naked Steven Tyler holding a zipper by his crotch with half his body painted black (to give the effect he pulled down a zipper, unzipping his body) and lead guitarist Joe Perry playing a lead guitar solo in front of an oncoming McCloud River Railroad freight train. The train scene was filmed on Lake Britton Bridge in Shasta County, California, the same bridge where Stand by Me filmed their famous train scene and employs the same Introvision technology.

The train scene features McCloud River Railroad No. 39, an EMD SD38-2 diesel locomotive, which is also represented by a static stage prop during the live performance scenes.

== Reception ==
"Livin' on the Edge" met with dismissive reactions from music critics. Reviewing Get a Grip for Rolling Stone, Mark Coleman cited "Livin' on the Edge" as an example of the album "playing it safe according to strict late-Eighties directives", and added that it "ascends into a soaring, Bon Jovi-esque power chorale; only the gritty guitars on the bridge keep the damn thing grounded." David Browne of Entertainment Weekly also found the song was uncomfortably derivative of Bon Jovi, remarking that it "might have worked better if it didn’t sound like Bon Jovi trying hard to sound like Aerosmith." Both Browne and Allmusic's Stephen Thomas Erlewine described the song's lyrics as a halfhearted, ineffectual attempt at social commentary.

The song won a Grammy Award for Best Rock Performance by a Duo or Group with Vocal for the year 1993. The video for the song earned the band a Viewer's Choice award at the 1993 MTV Video Music Awards. The video was also voted "Best Video" by Metal Edge readers in the magazine's 1993 Readers' Choice Awards.

== Live performances ==
"Livin' on the Edge" has been a staple at Aerosmith concerts ever since its release. During the Get a Grip Tour, the band performed a portion of "She Cried" (a song recorded by Jay and the Americans, among other artists) as the intro to "Livin' on the Edge". Performances often involved Tyler screaming "There ain't no life nowhere" (from the song "I Don't Live Today" by The Jimi Hendrix Experience) and then breathing heavily over a bright light during the brief interlude. "Livin' on the Edge" was performed at the 1993 MTV Video Music Awards, the 36th Grammy Awards, and at Woodstock '94. Additionally, the band performed the song as part of its set at the United We Stand benefit concert, held in Washington, D.C. shortly after the September 11 attacks.

== Track listings ==
CD single

No.	Title	Writer(s)	Length
1.	"Livin' on the Edge" (LP version)	Steven Tyler, Joe Perry, Mark Hudson	6:07
2.	"Don't Stop"	Tyler, Perry, Jim Vallance	4:05
3.	"Flesh" (LP version)	Tyler, Perry, Desmond Child	5:57

US maxi-CD single

No.	Title	Writer(s)	Length
1.	"Livin' on the Edge" (LP version)	Steven Tyler, Joe Perry, Mark Hudson	6:07
2.	"Livin' on the Edge" (acoustic version)	Tyler, Perry, Hudson	5:46
3.	"Livin' on the Edge" (demo)	Tyler, Perry, Hudson	5:11
4.	"Don't Stop"	Tyler, Perry, Jim Vallance	4:06
5.	"Can't Stop Messin'"	Tyler, Perry, Desmond Child	3:30

Strictly limited-edition CD single

No.	Title	Writer(s)	Length
1.	"Livin' on the Edge" (LP version)	Tyler, Perry, Hudson	6:07
2.	"Livin' on the Edge" (acoustic version)	Tyler, Perry, Hudson	5:41
3.	"Can't Stop Messin'" (international release LP version)	Tyler, Perry, Jack Blades, Tommy Shaw	3:21

German CD single

No.	Title	Writer(s)	Length
1.	"Livin' on the Edge" (LP version)	Steven Tyler, Joe Perry, Mark Hudson	6:07
2.	"Don't Stop"	Tyler, Perry, Jim Vallance	4:05
3.	"Flesh" (LP version)	Tyler, Perry, Desmond Child	5:57
4.	"Livin' on the Edge" (acoustic version)	Tyler, Perry, Hudson	5:41

== Charts ==
=== Weekly charts ===
Chart (1993)	Peak position
Australia (ARIA)	21
Belgium (Ultratop 50 Flanders)	47
Canada Top Singles (RPM)	10
Europe (Eurochart Hot 100)	29
Europe (European Hit Radio)	19
Finland (Suomen virallinen lista)	9
Iceland (Íslenski Listinn Topp 40)	37
Netherlands (Single Top 100)	42
New Zealand (Recorded Music NZ)	11
Norway (VG-lista)	4
Portugal (AFP)	3
Spain (AFYVE)	12
Sweden (Sverigetopplistan)	29
Switzerland (Schweizer Hitparade)	21
UK Singles (Official Charts)	19
UK Airplay (Music Week)	23
US Billboard Hot 100	18
US Mainstream Rock (Billboard)	1
US Pop Airplay (Billboard)	19
US Cash Box Top 100	3

=== Year-end charts ===
Chart (1993)	Position
Canada Top Singles (RPM)	81
US Billboard Hot 100	94
US Album Rock Tracks (Billboard)	3

== Release history ==
Region	Date	Format(s)	Label(s)	Ref.
United States	March 1993	Maxi-CD	Geffen	
Japan	March 24, 1993	Maxi-CD	Geffen	
Australia	March 28, 1993	CD; cassette	Geffen	
United Kingdom	March 29, 1993	12-inch vinyl; CD; cassette	Geffen	

== See also ==
- Livin' In the Fridge, a parody song by "Weird Al" Yankovic
