= The Other Side (Aerosmith song) =

1990 single by Aerosmith

Single by Aerosmith

from the album Pump
- B-side: "My Girl"
- Released: June 6, 1990
- Genre: Glam metal; pop metal
- Length: 4:07
- Label: Geffen
- Songwriters: Steven Tyler; Jim Vallance; Holland-Dozier-Holland
- Producer: Bruce Fairbairn

Aerosmith singles chronology
"What It Takes" (1990)	"The Other Side" (1990)	"Monkey on My Back" (1990)

Music video
- "The Other Side" on YouTube

"The Other Side" is a song performed by the American rock band Aerosmith, and written by Steven Tyler, Jim Vallance, and Holland-Dozier-Holland. It was released on June 6, 1990, as the fourth single from the band's 10th album, Pump (1989). The song reached number 22 on the US Billboard Hot 100 chart and number one on the Billboard Album Rock Tracks chart, becoming the band's third song to top the chart.

== Background ==
Jim Vallance composed the instrumental parts for the song between Christmas and New Year's Eve 1988. He then mailed a demo of the song with guitar, piano, bass, drums, and horn synthesizer to Aerosmith singer Steven Tyler, who came up with the lyrics and vocal melody. The songwriting team of Holland-Dozier-Holland were eventually given songwriting credit on the song after threatening to file suit over similarities between "The Other Side" and their song "Standing in the Shadows of Love".

== Music video ==
A music video was produced to promote the single. The video was directed by Marty Callner, and featured John Kalodner. The video includes the intro piece "Dulcimer Stomp".

== Awards ==
The song won the MTV Video Music Award for Best Rock Video in 1991.

== Track listing ==
Maxi-CD single

All tracks are written by Steven Tyler and Jim Vallance, except where noted.

No.	Title	Writer(s)	Length
1.	"The Other Side" (LP version)		4:07
2.	"The Other Side" (Matt Dike 'Honky Tonk' version)		5:10
3.	"The Other Side" (club mix)		7:05
4.	"Theme from Wayne's World"	Mike Myers, Dana Carvey	1:30
5.	"My Girl" (LP version)	Steven Tyler, Joe Perry	3:11

== Charts ==
=== Weekly charts ===
Chart (1990)	Peak position
Canada Top Singles (RPM)	22
UK Singles (Official Charts)	46
US Billboard Hot 100	22
US Album Rock Tracks (Billboard)	1
US Cash Box Top 100	19

=== Year-end charts ===
Chart (1990)	Position
US Album Rock Tracks (Billboard)	8

== Release history ==
Region	Date	Format(s)	Label(s)	Ref.
United States	June 6, 1990	Maxi-CD	Geffen	
Japan	September 10, 1990	Mini-CD	Geffen	

== See also ==
- List of glam metal albums and songs
