= Amazing (Aerosmith song) =

1993 single by Aerosmith

Single by Aerosmith

from the album Get a Grip
- B-side: "Gotta Love It"
- Released: November 1993
- Genre: Rock
- Length: 5:55 (album version); 4:38 (edit version); 6:48 (video version)
- Label: Geffen
- Songwriters: Steven Tyler; Richie Supa
- Producer: Bruce Fairbairn

Aerosmith singles chronology
"Cryin'" (1993)	"Amazing" (1993)	"Deuces Are Wild" (1994)

Music video
- "Amazing" on YouTube

"Amazing" is a song by American hard rock band Aerosmith, released in November 1993 by Geffen Records as the fourth single from their eleventh studio album, Get a Grip (1993). The song is written by band member Steven Tyler with Richie Supa, and produced by Bruce Fairbairn. It peaked at number 24 on the US Billboard Hot 100 and number 58 on the UK Singles Chart. Its accompanying music video, directed by Marty Callner, featuring Alicia Silverstone and Jason London, received a nomination for Best Clip of the Year in the category for Rock at the 1994 Billboard Music Video Awards.

== Background ==
Don Henley lends his vocals, shadowing lead singer Steven Tyler in parts of this song. The rock ballad was written by Tyler and longtime band friend and collaborator Richie Supa, and released in November 1993 by Geffen Records. It peaked at numbers 24 and 20 on the US Billboard Hot 100 and Cash Box Top 100, number three on the Billboard Album Rock Tracks chart and number nine on the Billboard Top 40/Mainstream chart. The song was also successful abroad, peaking at number two in Iceland, number four in Canada, number five in Norway, and the top 20 in the Netherlands and Switzerland.

On the album Get a Grip, as soon as the song ends, a radio is heard being tuned into a recording of "Who Threw the Whiskey in the Well", recorded by Lucky Millinder. Tyler says, "So from all of us at Aerosmith to all of you out there, wherever you are, remember: the light at the end of the tunnel may be you. Good night." Millinder's orchestra plays as the music fades out.

== Lyrical content ==
"Amazing" was written by Steven Tyler, with assistance from the professional songwriter and former bandmate Richie Supa. It tells about his troubled life and drug abuse after the band broke up. The 1987 comeback album Permanent Vacation and its title track are mentioned in the lyrics for "Amazing".

== Critical reception ==
Pan-European magazine Music & Media commented, "Hold your lighters into the air and do the wave, because this is the ultimate stadium rock ballad. You will still be singing it when you drive home." Leesa Daniels from Smash Hits gave "Amazing" five out of five, writing, "The 'Smith have yet again come up with another anthem rock ballad that'll have you screeching in full rock god style until your lungs explode."

== Music video ==
The accompanying music video for the song, directed by American director Marty Callner, is well known for its depiction of digital technology and was the second appearance of Alicia Silverstone in the band's videos. Paired with her was Jason London, star of Dazed and Confused, a film which was released in the same year as Get a Grip and which memorably made numerous references to Aerosmith. The characters appear in the music video as two cyberspace kids who escape to a world of virtual reality together, neither realizing the other is also in virtual reality. The head-mounted display worn by London in the video was manufactured by Liquid Image, who was contacted by the production crew and asked to provide a head-mounted display system for the VR sequence. Aerosmith guitarist Joe Perry suffered a slight head injury during the making of the video, and it was extended by 52 seconds at the end, where two loops were inserted. The video was nominated for Best Clip of the Year in the category for Rock at the 1994 Billboard Music Video Awards.

=== Synopsis ===
In the virtual dream world, Silverstone and London embark on a motorcycle journey and sky-dive, as well as engage in a steamy makeout session. One part of the video shows the characters boarding and taking flight in a biplane which, combined with the digital technology, creates what is often regarded as a fascinating dichotomy between antiquated and modern technology, in some ways presenting a parallel for the characters. Meanwhile, members of the band perform in various parts throughout the song, including in a tunnel, as well as solo shots of Steven Tyler in a room by himself and Joe Perry playing a guitar solo with a cityscape in the background. At the end of the video, it is discovered that it was Silverstone who was engaging in the virtual fantasy.

== Track listing ==
US 7-inch and cassette single
No.	Title	Length
1.	"Amazing" (LP version)	5:56
2.	"Fever" (LP version)	4:16

European maxi-CD single
No.	Title	Length
2.	"Amazing" (orchestral version)	5:58
3.	"Amazing" (acoustic)	5:57
4.	"Gotta Love It" (LP version)	5:58

== Charts ==
=== Weekly charts ===
Chart (1993–1994)	Peak position
Australia (ARIA)	105
Austria (Ö3 Austria Top 40)	27
Belgium (Ultratop 50 Flanders)	33
Canada Top Singles (RPM)	4
Europe (Eurochart Hot 100)	32
Europe (European Hit Radio)	24
Germany (GfK)	28
Iceland (Íslenski Listinn Topp 40)	2
Netherlands (Dutch Top 40)	13
Netherlands (Single Top 100)	12
Norway (VG-lista)	5
Portugal (AFP)	7
Sweden (Sverigetopplistan)	24
Switzerland (Schweizer Hitparade)	16
UK Singles (Official Charts)	58
US Billboard Hot 100	24
US Mainstream Rock (Billboard)	3
US Pop Airplay (Billboard)	9
US Cash Box Top 100	20

=== Year-end charts ===
Chart (1994)	Position
Canada Top Singles (RPM)	51
Iceland (Íslenski Listinn Topp 40)	6
US Billboard Hot 100	72
US Album Rock Tracks (Billboard)	26

== Release history ==
Region	Date	Format(s)	Label(s)	Ref.
United States	November 1993	7-inch vinyl; cassette	Geffen	
Japan	November 21, 1993	CD	Geffen	
Australia	November 22, 1993	CD; cassette	Geffen	
United Kingdom	December 6, 1993	12-inch vinyl; CD; cassette	Geffen	
