= Pump (album) =

Studio album by Aerosmith
- Released: September 12, 1989
- Recorded: February–June 1989
- Studios: Little Mountain Sound (Vancouver, British Columbia, Canada)
- Genres: Glam metal; hard rock
- Length: 47:44
- Label: Geffen
- Producer: Bruce Fairbairn

Aerosmith chronology
Permanent Vacation (1987)	Pump (1989)	Get a Grip (1993)

Singles from Pump
- 1. "Love in an Elevator" Released: August 15, 1989; 2. "Janie's Got a Gun" Released: November 8, 1989; 3. "What It Takes" Released: February 26, 1990; 4. "The Other Side" Released: June 6, 1990

Pump is the tenth album by the American rock band Aerosmith. It was released on September 12, 1989, by Geffen Records. The album peaked at No. 5 on the US charts, and was certified 7x Platinum by the RIAA in 1995.

The album contains the hit singles "Love in an Elevator", "The Other Side", "What It Takes", "Janie's Got a Gun", which all entered the Top 40 of the Hot 100. It also has certified sales of seven million copies in the U.S. to date, and is tied with its successor Get a Grip as Aerosmith's second best-selling studio album in the U.S. (Toys in the Attic leads with nine million). It produced a variety of successes and "firsts" for the band including their first Grammy Award ("Janie's Got a Gun"). "Love in an Elevator" became the first Aerosmith song to hit number one on the Mainstream Rock Tracks chart. The album was the fourth best-selling album of the year 1990.

In the UK, it was the second Aerosmith album to be certified Silver (60,000 units sold) by the British Phonographic Industry, achieving this in September 1989.

Pump was the second of three sequentially recorded Aerosmith albums to feature producer Bruce Fairbairn and engineers Mike Fraser and Ken Lomas at Little Mountain Sound Studios.

Two video documentaries on the recording, Things That Go Pump in the Night and The Making of Pump, were released on VHS and LaserDisc in 1990, with the latter also released on DVD in 1997.

== Production ==
In December 1988, Aerosmith got together at Rik Tinory Productions in Cohasset, Massachusetts to rehearse and compose new songs, as the band members thought the isolated nature of the studio would help their creativity. Over 19 songs were written, split between an "A-list" with songs considered possible hits, such as "Love in an Elevator" and "What It Takes", and the "B-list" having songs yet to be developed such as "Voodoo Medicine Man". Producer Bruce Fairbairn focused on getting as many hooks on the songs as possible.

Some songs proposed for the album, though never released in their original form, include "Girl's Got Somethin'", "Is Anybody Out There", "Guilty Kilt", "Rubber Bandit", "Sniffin'", and "Sedona Sunrise". Many songs also had alternate titles, for example, "Voodoo Medicine Man" was originally titled "Buried Alive" and "News for Ya Baby". The majority of these songs can be seen in photos of the studio's whiteboard and in footage from The Making of Pump.

In January 1989, the band went to Vancouver to again record at Fairbairn's Little Mountain Sound, where the producer had helmed Bon Jovi's Slippery When Wet and New Jersey. "I don't even listen to Bon Jovi," Steven Tyler protested, "so we didn't say, 'Oh, shit, they had a great album,' and go up there."

Aerosmith were at Little Mountain Sound at the same time that Mötley Crüe were recording their album Dr. Feelgood. As a result, Steven Tyler and the Margarita Horns (Aerosmith's horn section) contributed backing vocals and instrumentation to several tracks on that album. During the vocal sessions, Mick Mars' guitar sound leaked from the room next door due to Mars' volume and many amplifiers.

The intention with the album was exploring a rawness that had been glossed over for a commercial sound in Permanent Vacation. Joe Perry declared that "When we went to do this album, we knew what we wanted, we wanted to strip off a little fat we felt on our last one. We didn't say 'We need a drug song or a child abuse song,' but when they fit, we used them. That's Aerosmith: we aren't bound by any rules." This escape from the rules led to the instrumental interludes between the songs. The interludes were done with the collaboration of musician Randy Raine-Reusch, who was brought to the studio after Perry and Tyler visited his house to search for unusual instruments to employ. Many of the lyrics employ sexual themes, which Tyler attributed to having "making up for the lost time" he spent using drugs instead of having sex in the 1970s.

"Janie's Got a Gun"
Sample of "Janie's Got a Gun", a story about a girl seeking revenge on her abusive father, inspired by a magazine article on gun violence.

On a 1989 MTV special entitled "Aerosmith Sunday", Brad Whitford explained the album title with "Now that we're off drugs, we're all pumped up."

Steven Tyler regretted not putting lyrics in the album booklet, something that happened because Geffen was afraid the Parents Music Resource Center would protest over lyrical content with many sex and drugs references. To remedy this omission, the lyrics were included in the tour program. The album cover features a black and white photo of a smaller International K Series truck on top of a larger International KB Series truck, both with their cargo beds removed. The chrome International markings on the hoods have been replaced with the letters "F.I.N.E.", short for "Fucked Up, Insecure, Neurotic, and Emotional" as stated in the album's liner notes.

== Lawsuit ==
Aerosmith found themselves in a lawsuit after a small rock band named Pump sued Aerosmith's management company for service mark infringement. Aerosmith won the case. Aerosmith also found themselves in legal trouble when the songwriting team Holland–Dozier–Holland threatened to sue the band over the main melody in Aerosmith's song "The Other Side" which sounded similar to the melody in the song "Standing in the Shadows of Love". As part of the settlement, Aerosmith agreed to add "Holland–Dozier–Holland" in the songwriting credits for "The Other Side".

== Reception ==
Professional ratings
Review scores
Source	Rating
AllMusic	4.5/5 stars
Blender	4/5 stars
Christgau's Record Guide	B+
Encyclopedia of Popular Music	4/5 stars
The Great Rock Discography	8/10
MusicHound	4/5
Q	5/5 stars
Rolling Stone	4/5 stars
The Rolling Stone Album Guide	4/5 stars
Sounds	5/5 stars

The album received mostly positive reception, and has since been called "a high-water mark of the glam metal era", that "stands toe to toe against Aerosmith's undisputed mid-'70s classics." Many critics noted its more classic hard rock sound than the pop metal of its predecessor.

"At a time when young guns from Mötley Crüe to Poison were doing their level best to hoist the heavy metal crown from the likes of Def Leppard and Bon Jovi," noted Q, "it took a bunch of hoary, addled old stagers like Aerosmith to come up with the year's best metal album."

"Aerosmith is still the reigning king of the hard-rock double entendre," wrote Rolling Stone. "But Pump – like, real subtle – has more going for it than locker-room laughs, such as the vintage high-speed crunch (circa Toys in the Attic) of 'Young Lust', the sassy slap 'n' tickle of 'My Girl' and the kitchen-sink sound of 'Janie's Got A Gun'."

"If fried brains is your idea of a rock dream, the first side will do the job at least as good as whatever raging slab is also your idea of a rock dream," wrote Robert Christgau. "For five songs, everything loud and acrid about them just keeps on coming--not even tune doctors can stave off the juggernaut. Of course, this band's idea of a rock dream is also the traditional 'Young Lust' and 'Love in an Elevator'--OK as far as it goes, but I could do with more 'Janie's Got a Gun,' in which an abused teenager offs her dad."

"Messrs Tyler and Perry" observed Hi-Fi News & Record Review, "have cleaned up their act, hoovered their nostrils, added a few more items of choice veg to their cod-pieces and come up with a stonker."

Spin placed it at No. 279 on their list of "The 300 Best Albums of the Past 30 Years", and said "Aerosmith gets no respect for locating that perfect sweet spot between the shamelessness of ‘80s sleaze-metal and the self-aware wink of proto-ironic ‘90s MTV culture". The album was also included in the book 1001 Albums You Must Hear Before You Die.

Loudwire ranked the album fourth in their ranking of Aerosmith albums, and said, "'Pump,' like its multiplatinum predecessor, 'Permanent Vacation,' unabashedly catered to '80s hair metal trends with glossy mega-productions like 'Love in an Elevator' and the Grammy-winning 'Janie's Got a Gun,' but it also did a commendable job of reviving the vintage Aerosmith style on loads of amazing tunes".

== Track listing ==
All tracks are written by Steven Tyler and Joe Perry, except where noted.

Pump track listing
No.	Title	Writer(s)	Length
1.	"Young Lust"	Tyler, Perry, Jim Vallance	4:19
2.	"F.I.N.E.*"	Tyler, Perry, Desmond Child	4:08
3.	"Going Down" "Love in an Elevator"		0:17; 5:21
4.	"Monkey on My Back"		3:56
5.	"Water Song" "Janie's Got a Gun"	Tyler, Tom Hamilton	0:11; 5:29
6.	"Dulcimer Stomp" "The Other Side"	Tyler, Vallance, Brian Holland, Lamont Dozier, Eddie Holland	0:50; 4:06
7.	"My Girl"		3:10
8.	"Don't Get Mad, Get Even"		4:48
9.	"Hoodoo" "Voodoo Medicine Man"	Tyler, Brad Whitford	0:55; 3:46
10.	"What It Takes" (Includes an instrumental hidden track composed & performed by Randy Raine-Reusch)	Tyler, Perry, Child	6:28
Total length:			47:44

Japanese version
No.	Title	Writer(s)	Length
11.	"Ain't Enough"	Tyler, Perry	5:02
Total length:			52:46

Japanese Reissue 2025 (SHM-CD)
No.	Title	Writer(s)	Length
12.	"Deuces Are Wild"	Tyler, Vallance	3:39
13.	"Love in an Elevator (Live)" (Recorded live at the Hammersmith Odeon in London on November 15, 1989)		5:01

== Personnel ==
Aerosmith

- Steven Tyler – lead vocals, guitar, keyboards, harmonica
- Joe Perry – guitar: second solo on "Love in an Elevator", slide guitar on "Monkey on My Back", backing vocals
- Brad Whitford – guitar: lead guitar on "Voodoo Medicine Man" and first solo on "Love in an Elevator"
- Tom Hamilton – bass guitar, backing vocals on "Love in an Elevator"
- Joey Kramer – drums

Additional personnel

- Bob Dowd – backing vocals on "Love in an Elevator"
- Catherine Epps – spoken intro (Elevator Operator) on "Love in an Elevator"
- Bruce Fairbairn – trumpet, backing vocals on "Love in an Elevator"
- The Margarita Horns (Bruce Fairbairn, Henry Christian, Ian Putz, Tom Keenlyside) – brass instruments, saxophones
- John Webster – keyboards
- Randy Raine-Reusch – musical interludes (glass harmonica on "Water Song", Appalachian dulcimer on "Dulcimer Stomp", didgeridoo on "Don't Get Mad, Get Even", and Thai khaen on "Hoodoo"), plus naw (gourd mouth organ of the Lahu people of Northern Thailand) starting at 5:19 in the hidden track contained in "What It Takes"

Production

- Producer: Bruce Fairbairn
- Engineers: Michael Fraser, Ken Lomas
- Mixing: Mike Fraser
- Mastering: Greg Fulginiti
- Mastering Supervisor: David Donnelly
- Art direction: Kim Champagne, Gabrielle Raumberger
- Logo design: Andy Engel
- Photography: Norman Seeff
- Tattoo art: Mark Ryden
- John Kalodner: John Kalodner

== Charts ==
=== Weekly charts ===
Weekly chart performance for Pump
Chart (1989–1991)	Peak position
Australian Albums (ARIA)	1
Canada Top Albums/CDs (RPM)	2
Dutch Albums (Album Top 100)	33
Finnish Albums (Suomen virallinen lista)	7
German Albums (Offizielle Top 100)	13
Hungarian Albums (MAHASZ)	38
Italian Albums (Musica e Dischi)	17
Japanese Albums (Oricon)	10
New Zealand Albums (RMNZ)	8
Norwegian Albums (VG-lista)	9
Swedish Albums (Sverigetopplistan)	8
Swiss Albums (Schweizer Hitparade)	9
UK Albums (Official Charts)	3
US Billboard 200	5

Chart (1995)	Peak position
Scottish Albums (Official Charts)	72

=== Year-end charts ===
Year-end chart performance for Pump
Chart (1990)	Position
Australian Albums (ARIA)	19
New Zealand Albums (RMNZ)	10
US Billboard 200	4

=== Decade-end charts ===
Decade-end chart performance for Pump
Chart (1990–1999)	Position
US Billboard 200	73

== Certifications ==
Certifications for Pump
Region	Certification	Certified units/sales
Australia (ARIA)	2× Platinum	140,000^{^}
Canada (Music Canada)	7× Platinum	700,000^{^}
Germany (BVMI)	Gold	250,000^{^}
Japan (RIAJ)	Gold	100,000^{^}
New Zealand (RMNZ)	Platinum	15,000^{^}
United Kingdom (BPI)	Gold	100,000^{^}
United States (RIAA)	7× Platinum	7,000,000^{^}
^{^} Shipments figures based on certification alone.

== See also ==
- Things That Go Pump in the Night
- Pump Tour
