= Aerosmith discography =

Recordings by American rock band

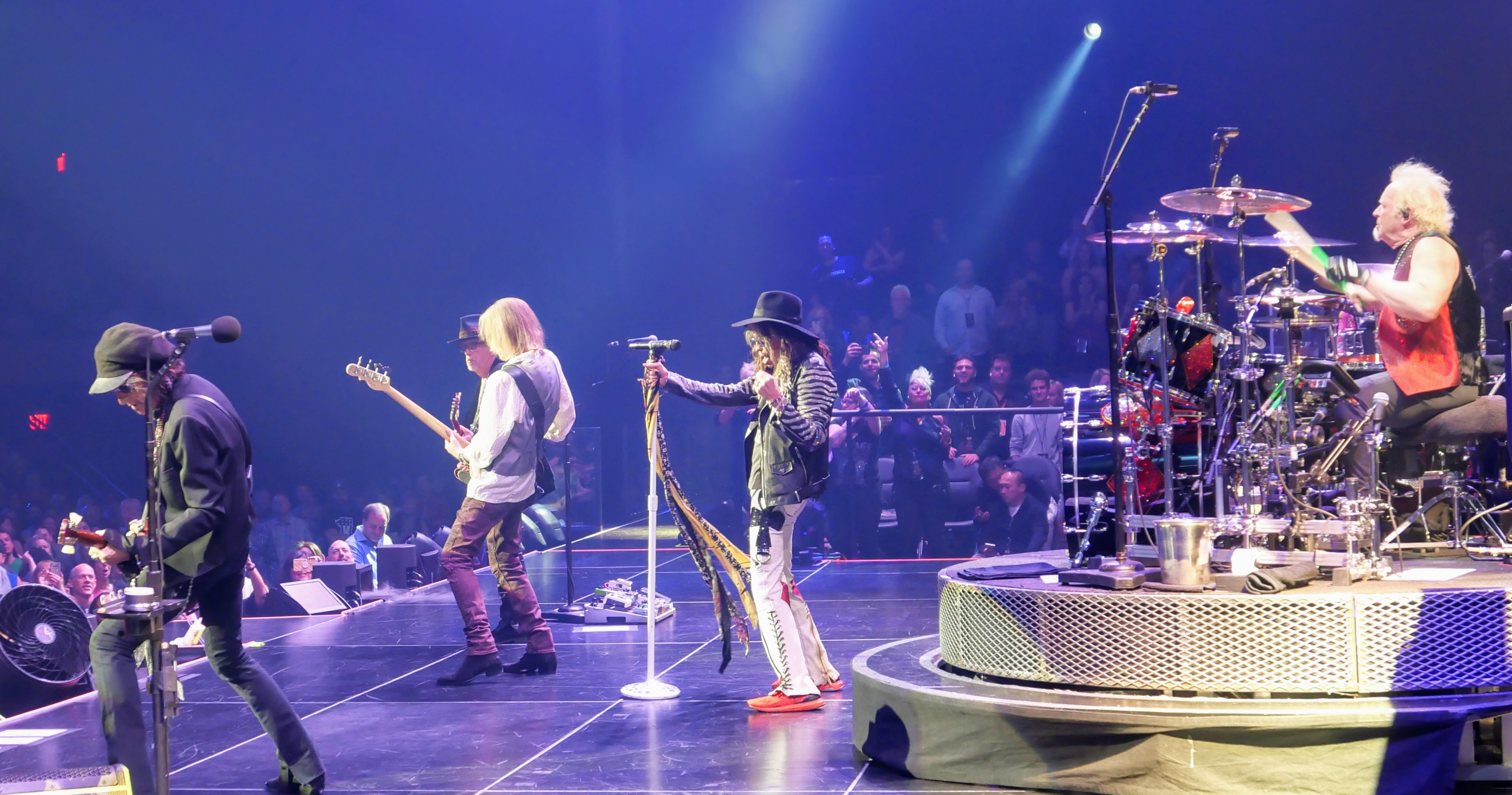
- Aerosmith performing in Las Vegas, Nevada on April 13, 2019.
- Studio albums: 15
- Extended plays: 3
- Live albums: 7
- Compilation albums: 15
- Singles: 72

American rock band Aerosmith has released 15 studio albums, seven live albums, 15 compilation albums, two extended plays, and 72 singles. Aerosmith was formed in Boston, Massachusetts in 1970 by vocalist Steven Tyler, guitarists Joe Perry and Ray Tabano, bassist Tom Hamilton, and drummer Joey Kramer. Tabano was replaced by Brad Whitford in 1971. Other than a period from 1979 to 1984, this lineup has remained the same.

Twenty-one of Aerosmith's songs have reached the top 40 of the Billboard Hot 100 and the band has long been a stalwart of the Mainstream Rock Tracks chart, achieving nine number-one hits on that chart to date. An additional 28 of the band's songs have reached the top 40 on various charts worldwide. The band has achieved four multi-platinum singles ("Dream On", "Sweet Emotion", "Walk This Way", and "I Don't Want to Miss a Thing"), while an additional eight singles have attained silver, gold, or platinum certifications in various territories.

Aerosmith is estimated to have sold well over 150 million albums around the world, making them the biggest-selling hard rock band in United States history. As of November 2021, the band has sold 69.5 million albums in the United States in terms of certification units, and 31,702,000 albums since 1991 when SoundScan started tracking actual sales figures.

== Albums ==
=== Studio albums ===
List of studio albums, with selected chart positions and certifications
Title	Album details	Peak chart positions										Certifications
Title	Album details	US	AUS	AUT	CAN	GER	NLD	NZ	SWE	SWI	UK	Certifications
Aerosmith	Released: January 5, 1973; Label: Columbia	21	—	—	58	—	—	—	—	—	—	CAN: Platinum; US: 2× Platinum
Get Your Wings	Released: March 15, 1974; Label: Columbia	14	—	—	—	—	—	—	—	—	—	CAN: Platinum; US: 3× Platinum
Toys in the Attic	Released: April 8, 1975; Label: Columbia	11	79	—	7	—	—	—	—	—	—	CAN: Platinum; US: 9× Platinum
Rocks	Released: May 3, 1976; Label: Columbia	3	45	—	14	—	—	—	46	—	—	CAN: Platinum; US: 4× Platinum
Draw the Line	Released: December 9, 1977; Label: Columbia	11	—	—	10	—	—	—	—	—	—	CAN: Gold; US: 2× Platinum
Night in the Ruts	Released: November 16, 1979; Label: Columbia	14	—	—	8	—	—	—	—	—	—	CAN: Gold; US: Platinum
Rock in a Hard Place	Released: August 1, 1982; Label: Columbia	32	—	—	24	—	—	—	—	—	—	US: Gold
Done with Mirrors	Released: November 4, 1985; Label: Geffen	36	—	—	72	—	—	—	—	—	—	US: Gold
Permanent Vacation	Released: August 18, 1987; Label: Geffen	11	42	—	7	—	—	—	—	—	37	CAN: 5× Platinum; UK: Gold; US: 5× Platinum
Pump	Released: September 12, 1989; Label: Geffen	5	1	—	2	13	33	8	8	9	3	AUS: 2× Platinum; CAN: 7× Platinum; GER: Gold; UK: Gold; US: 7× Platinum
Get a Grip	Released: April 20, 1993; Label: Geffen	1	3	3	2	3	2	9	3	1	2	AUS: Gold; AUT: Platinum; CAN: Diamond; GER: Platinum; SWE: Platinum; SWI: Gold; UK: Platinum; US: 7× Platinum
Nine Lives	Released: March 18, 1997; Label: Columbia	1	13	2	2	3	17	14	3	3	4	AUT: Gold; CAN: 3× Platinum; GER: Gold; SWI: Platinum; UK: Gold; US: 2× Platinum
Just Push Play	Released: March 6, 2001; Label: Columbia	2	27	7	2	6	32	—	19	3	7	SWI: Gold; UK: Silver; US: Platinum
Honkin' on Bobo	Released: March 30, 2004; Label: Columbia	5	59	22	5	32	64	—	38	17	28	US: Gold
Music from Another Dimension!	Released: November 6, 2012; Label: Columbia	5	30	12	6	7	33	—	11	5	14	CAN: Gold
"—" denotes a recording that did not chart or was not released in that territory.

=== Live albums ===
Title	Album details	Peak chart positions									Certifications
Title	Album details	US	AUT	CAN	FRA	GER	NLD	SWE	SWI	UK	Certifications
Live! Bootleg	Released: October 27, 1978; Label: Columbia	13	—	—	—	—	—	—	—	—	CAN: Gold; US: Platinum
Classics Live!	Released: April 7, 1986; Label: Columbia	84	—	—	—	—	—	—	—	—	US: Platinum
Classics Live! II	Released: June 29, 1987; Label: Columbia	—	—	—	—	—	—	—	—	—	US: Gold
A Little South of Sanity	Released: October 20, 1998; Label: Geffen	12	37	6	39	21	34	16	24	36	CAN: Platinum; UK: Gold; US: Platinum
Rockin' the Joint	Released: October 25, 2005; Label: Columbia	24	—	68	—	—	—	—	97	—	
Aerosmith Rocks Donington 2014	Released: September 6, 2015; Label: Universal Music Group	—	—	—	—	—	—	—	—	—	
1971: The Road Starts Hear	Released: November 26, 2021; Label: Universal Music Enterprises	—	—	—	—	—	—	—	—	—	
"—" denotes albums that did not chart.

=== Compilation albums ===
Title	Album details	Peak chart positions						Certifications
Title	Album details	US	AUS	GER	NZ	SWI	UK	Certifications
Aerosmith's Greatest Hits	Released: November 11, 1980; Label: Columbia	43	—	—	—	—	—	CAN: Platinum; UK: Silver; US: Diamond (12× Platinum)
Anthology	Released: June 1988 (UK only); Label: Raw Power	—	—	—	—	—	—	
Gems	Released: November 15, 1988; Label: Columbia	133	148	—	—	—	—	US: Gold
Pandora's Box	Released: November 19, 1991; Label: Columbia	45	133	—	—	—	—	US: Platinum
Pandora's Toys	Released: June 8, 1994; Label: Columbia	—	—	52	—	21	—	
Big Ones	Released: November 1, 1994; Label: Geffen	6	12	5	4	6	7	AUS: Gold; AUT: Gold; CAN: 8× Platinum; GER: Gold; UK: Platinum; US: 4× Platinum
Box of Fire	Released: November 22, 1994; Label: Columbia	—	—	—	—	—	—	US: Gold
Classic Aerosmith: The Universal Masters Collection	Released: November 2, 2000; Label: Geffen	—	—	—	—	—	—	
Young Lust: The Aerosmith Anthology	Released: November 20, 2001; Label: Geffen	191	48	78	15	—	32	UK: Platinum; US: Gold
O, Yeah! Ultimate Aerosmith Hits	Released: July 2, 2002; Label: Columbia/Geffen	4	82	—	—	90	6	UK: Silver; US: 3× Platinum
20th Century Masters: The Millennium Collection – The Best of Aerosmith	Released: October 7, 2003; Label: Geffen	67	—	—	—	—	—	
Devil's Got a New Disguise: The Very Best of Aerosmith	Released: October 17, 2006; Label: Columbia/Geffen	33	31	80	2	30	19	UK: Platinum
Tough Love: Best of the Ballads	Released: May 10, 2011; Label: Geffen	109	—	—	—	87	42	
The Essential Aerosmith	Released: September 13, 2011; Label: Columbia	104	44	—	—	86	—	UK: Gold
Greatest Hits	Released: August 18, 2023; Label: Capitol	36	—	—	—	—	—	
"—" denotes albums that did not chart.

== Extended plays ==
Title	Album details	Peak chart positions				
Title	Album details	US	GER	NZ	SWI	UK
Vacation Club	Released: December 10, 1988; Label: Geffen	—	—	—	—	—
Made in America	Released: March 18, 1997; Label: Columbia/Sony Music Special Products	—	—	—	—	—
One More Time (with Yungblud)	Released: November 21, 2025; Label: Capitol	9	11	18	5	1
"—" denotes EPs that did not chart.

== Singles ==
=== 1970s ===
Title	Year	Peak chart positions			Certifications	Album
Title	Year	US	AUS	CAN	Certifications	Album
"Dream On"	1973	59	—	87	RIAA: 4× Platinum; BPI: Platinum	Aerosmith
"Same Old Song and Dance"	1974	—	—	—		Get Your Wings
"Train Kept A Rollin'"	1974	—	—	—		Get Your Wings
"S.O.S. (Too Bad)"	1975	—	—	—		Get Your Wings
"Sweet Emotion"	1975	36	—	56	RIAA: 3× Platinum; BPI: Silver	Toys in the Attic
"Walk This Way"	1975	—	—	—	RIAA: 2× Platinum; BPI: Silver	Toys in the Attic
"You See Me Crying"	1975	—	—	—		Toys in the Attic
"Dream On" (re-issue)	1975	6	72	10		Aerosmith
"Last Child"	1976	21	—	26		Rocks
"Home Tonight"	1976	71	—	82		Rocks
"Walk This Way" (re-issue)	1976	10	85	7		Toys in the Attic
"Back in the Saddle"	1976	38	—	68		Rocks
"Draw the Line"	1977	42	—	38		Draw the Line
"Kings and Queens"	1978	70	—	77		Draw the Line
"Get It Up"	1978	—	—	—		Draw the Line
"Come Together"	1978	23	—	24		Sgt. Pepper's Lonely Hearts; Club Band: The Original Motion Picture Soundtrack
"Chip Away the Stone"	1978	77	—	—		Live! Bootleg
"Remember (Walking in the Sand)"	1979	67	—	29		Night in the Ruts
"—" denotes releases that did not chart

=== 1980s ===
Title	Year	Peak chart positions									Certifications	Album
Title	Year	US	US Rock	AUS	CAN	IRE	NLD	NZ	SWE	UK	Certifications	Album
"Lightning Strikes" (album track only)	1982	—	21	—	—	—	—	—	—	—		Rock in a Hard Place
"Bitch's Brew" (promo only)	1982	—	—	—	—	—	—	—	—	—		Rock in a Hard Place
"Let the Music Do the Talking"	1985	—	18	—	—	—	—	—	—	—		Done with Mirrors
"Shela"	1985	—	20	—	—	—	—	—	—	—		Done with Mirrors
"Darkness"	1986	—	—	—	—	—	—	—	—	—		Done with Mirrors
"My Fist Your Face"	1986	—	—	—	—	—	—	—	—	—		Done with Mirrors
"Dude (Looks Like a Lady)"	1987	14	4	95	22	10	—	—	—	45	BPI: Gold	Permanent Vacation
"Hangman Jury"	1987	—	14	—	—	—	—	—	—	—		Permanent Vacation
"Angel"	1988	3	2	—	14	—	—	—	—	69		Permanent Vacation
"Rag Doll"	1988	17	12	—	23	29	16	—	—	42		Permanent Vacation
"Magic Touch"	1988	—	42	—	—	—	—	—	—	—		Permanent Vacation
"Rockin' Pneumonia and the Boogie Woogie Flu"	1988	—	44	—	—	—	—	—	—	—		Less than Zero: Original Motion Picture Soundtrack
"Chip Away the Stone" (re-issue)	1989	—	13	—	—	—	—	—	—	—		Gems
"Love in an Elevator"	1989	5	1	33	13	18	14	15	—	13	RIAA: Gold	Pump
"F.I.N.E.*"	1989	—	14	—	—	—	—	—	—	—		Pump
"Janie's Got a Gun"	1989	4	2	1	2	—	—	13	12	76	ARIA: Platinum	Pump
"—" denotes releases that did not chart

=== 1990s ===
Title	Year	Peak chart positions										Certifications	Album
Title	Year	US	US Rock	US Main	AUS	CAN	GER	NLD	SWE	SWI	UK	Certifications	Album
"What It Takes"	1990	9	1	—	46	15	—	—	—	—	—		Pump
"The Other Side"	1990	22	1	—	73	22	—	—	—	—	46		Pump
"Monkey on My Back"	1990	—	17	—	—	—	—	—	—	—	—		Pump
"Dude (Looks Like a Lady)" (re-issue)	1990	—	—	—	—	—	—	—	—	—	20		Permanent Vacation
"Love Me Two Times"	1990	—	27	—	—	—	—	—	—	—	—		Air America: Original Soundtrack Album
"Sweet Emotion" (re-issue)	1991	—	36	—	—	—	—	—	—	—	—		Pandora's Box
"Helter Skelter"	1991	—	21	—	—	—	—	—	—	—	—		Pandora's Box
"Livin' on the Edge"	1993	18	1	19	21	10	—	42	29	21	19		Get a Grip
"Eat the Rich"	1993	—	5	—	63	45	—	—	—	—	34		Get a Grip
"Fever"	1993	—	5	—	—	—	—	—	—	—	—		Get a Grip
"Cryin'"	1993	12	1	11	80	8	7	5	3	4	17	RIAA: Gold; BPI: Silver	Get a Grip
"Amazing"	1993	24	3	9	105	4	28	12	24	16	57		Get a Grip
"Shut Up and Dance"	1994	—	—	—	—	—	—	—	—	—	24		Get a Grip
"Deuces Are Wild"	1994	—	1	—	—	25	—	—	—	—	—		The Beavis and Butt-Head Experience
"Crazy"	1994	17	7	7	127	3	43	28	—	28	23	BPI: Silver	Get a Grip
"Blind Man"	1994	48	3	23	76	5	89	37	—	—	23		Big Ones
"Walk on Water"	1995	—	16	—	149	62	—	—	—	—	—		Big Ones
"Nine Lives"	1997	—	37	—	—	—	—	—	—	—	—		Nine Lives
"Falling in Love (Is Hard on the Knees)"	1997	35	1	29	46	2	40	76	23	22	22	RIAA: Gold	Nine Lives
"Hole in My Soul"	1997	51	4	—	145	10	75	—	—	—	29		Nine Lives
"Pink"	1997	27	1	23	86	42	81	58	—	—	38	RIAA: Gold	Nine Lives
"Full Circle"	1997	—	—	—	—	—	—	—	—	—	—		Nine Lives
"Taste of India"	1998	—	3	—	—	40	—	—	—	—	—		Nine Lives
"I Don't Want to Miss a Thing"	1998	1	4	1	1	2	1	3	2	1	4	RIAA: 5× Platinum; ARIA: 2× Platinum; BPI: 4× Platinum; BVMI: Platinum	Armageddon: The Album
"What Kind of Love Are You On"	1998	—	4	—	—	—	—	—	—	—	—		Armageddon: The Album
"Pink" (re-issue)	1999	—	—	—	—	—	—	—	—	—	13		Nine Lives
"—" denotes releases that did not chart

=== 2000s ===
Title	Year	Peak chart positions										Certifications	Album
Title	Year	US	US Rock	US Main.	AUS	AUT	CAN	GER	NLD	SWI	UK	Certifications	Album
"Angel's Eye"	2000	—	4	—	—	—	—	—	—	—	—		Charlie's Angels: Music from the Motion Picture
"Jaded"	2001	7	1	6	51	47	6	48	54	30	13	RIAA: Gold	Just Push Play
"Just Push Play"	2001	—	10	38	—	—	—	—	—	—	—		Just Push Play
"Fly Away from Here"	2001	103	—	24	161	—	—	—	99	94	—		Just Push Play
"Sunshine"	2001	—	23	—	—	—	—	—	—	—	—		Just Push Play
"Girls of Summer"	2002	—	25	—	—	—	—	—	—	—	199		O, Yeah! Ultimate Aerosmith Hits
"Baby, Please Don't Go"	2004	—	7	—	—	—	—	—	—	—	—		Honkin' on Bobo
"Devil's Got a New Disguise"	2006	—	15	—	—	—	—	—	—	—	—		Devil's Got a New Disguise
"—" denotes releases that did not chart

=== 2010s ===
Title	Year	Peak chart positions		Album
Title	Year	US Rock	US Adult	Album
"Legendary Child"	2012	17	—	Music from Another Dimension!
"Lover Alot"	2012	31	—	Music from Another Dimension!
"What Could Have Been Love"	2012	—	22	Music from Another Dimension!
"Can't Stop Lovin' You" (featuring Carrie Underwood)	2013	—	—	Music from Another Dimension!
"—" denotes releases that did not chart

=== 2020s ===
Title	Year	Peak chart positions									Album
Title	Year	US Main. Rock	US Rock/ Alt.	US Rock Air.	US Hot Hard Rock	US Rock Digital Sales	US Hard Rock Digital Sales	CAN	CZE Modern Rock	NZ Hot	Album
"My Only Angel" (with Yungblud)	2025	6	23	13	1	1	1	82	14	13	One More Time EP
"Wild Woman" (with Yungblud)	2025	—	—	—	12	1	1	—	—	—	One More Time EP

=== Notes ===
- The Mainstream Rock Tracks chart was not created until 1981 and the Top 40 Mainstream chart was not created until the 1990s. Thus, both charts only include material after their creation.
- "Crazy" was released as a double A-side with "Blind Man" in the United Kingdom, so the chart position of #23 is given for both.

== Peak positions on other charts ==
Additionally, the band charted these on other charts:

- "Dude (Looks Like a Lady)" (1988) – #41 Dance Music/Club Play
- "I Don't Want to Miss a Thing" (1998) – #13 Adult Contemporary, #14 Hot Latin Tracks
- "Jaded" (2001) – #8 Top 40 Tracks, #21 Latin Tropical/Salsa Airplay, #30 Latin Pop Airplay
- "Fly Away from Here" (2001) – #34 Top 40 Tracks
- "Legendary Child" (2012) – #19 Active Rock, #3 Heritage Rock, #27 Hot Rock Songs, #69 Canadian Hot 100 Airplay
- "Lover Alot" (2012) – #19 Heritage Rock, #47 Hot Rock Songs
- "What Could Have Been Love" (2012) – #28 Adult Contemporary, #48 Hot Rock Songs

== Other appearances ==
Year	Song(s)	Album	Notes
1978	"Come Together"	Sgt. Pepper's Lonely Hearts Club Band	The Beatles cover
1987	"Rockin' Pneumonia and the Boogie Woogie Flu	Less than Zero	Huey "Piano" Smith cover
1990	"Love Me Two Times"	Air America	The Doors cover
1993	"Deuces Are Wild"	The Beavis and Butt-Head Experience	originally recorded for Pump
1998	"I Don't Want to Miss a Thing" and "What Kind of Love Are You On"	Armageddon	"I Don't Want to Miss a Thing" written by Diane Warren
2000	"Angel's Eye"	Charlie's Angels	written with Marti Frederiksen and Taylor Rhodes
2002	"Theme from Spider-Man"	Spider-Man	Paul Francis Webster and Robert Harris cover
2003	"Lizard Love"	Rugrats Go Wild	written with Jeff Lynne
2007	"Give Peace a Chance"	Instant Karma	John Lennon cover; featuring Sierra Leone's Refugee All Stars

== See also ==
- Aerosmith videography
- List of songs recorded by Aerosmith
- List of awards and nominations received by Aerosmith
- List of best-selling albums in the United States
- List of best-selling music artists
- List of best-selling music artists in the United States
- List of artists who reached number one on the Australian singles chart
- List of artists who reached number one on the Hot 100 (United States)
- List of artists who reached number one on the U.S. Mainstream Rock chart
- Joe Perry discography
- Steven Tyler discography
- Whitford/St. Holmes
