= Greatest Hits (2023 Aerosmith album) =

Greatest hits album by Aerosmith
- Released: August 18, 2023
- Recorded: 1972–2012
- Genre: Hard rock
- Length: 182:17
- Label: Capitol

Aerosmith chronology
Music from Another Dimension! (2012)	Greatest Hits (2023)	One More Time (2025)

Greatest Hits is a compilation album by American hard rock band Aerosmith, released on August 18, 2023, through Capitol Records. It was released in a variety of formats, with the main edition including 44 tracks, as well as a one-CD edition including 18 tracks, a two-LP version containing 20 tracks, and a single LP version containing 10 tracks. It is the band's second compilation titled Greatest Hits, following their 1980 collection, which was re-released multiple times. The album was released ahead of the band's 2023 Peace Out: The Farewell Tour. The Japanese deluxe edition includes three live albums, Live Best 1997–2016: Vol. 1, Live Best 1997–2016: Vol. 2 and Rock for Rising Sun: Live in Japan 2011.

== Critical reception ==
Professional ratings
Review scores
Source	Rating
AllMusic	4/5 stars
Classic Rock	4/5 stars

Classic Rock's Pat Carty wrote that "this collection has it all, while politely skipping over the albums they made while Perry and Whitford were on sabbatical" and felt that it contains "everything a reasonably sane person could possibly want", concluding "are Aerosmith the best American band who didn't come from E Street or play behind Tom Petty? Quite possibly."

== Track listing ==
The following is the digital configuration of the 44 tracks. The 4-LP version has a different order for some of the tracks.

Disc one
No.	Title	Length
1.	"Mama Kin"	4:25
2.	"Dream On"	4:24
3.	"Lord of the Thighs"	4:14
4.	"Same Old Song and Dance" (single version)	3:01
5.	"Train Kept a Rollin'"	5:33
6.	"S.O.S. (Too Bad)"	2:50
7.	"Seasons of Wither"	5:03
8.	"Walk This Way"	3:39
9.	"Big Ten Inch Record"	2:13
10.	"Adam's Apple"	4:32
11.	"Sweet Emotion"	4:33
12.	"Toys in the Attic"	3:04
13.	"Combination"	3:38
14.	"Nobody's Fault"	4:16
15.	"Home Tonight"	3:15
Total length:		58:48

Disc two
No.	Title	Length
1.	"Back in the Saddle"	4:39
2.	"Last Child"	3:26
3.	"Bright Light Fright"	2:18
4.	"Draw the Line"	3:22
5.	"Kings and Queens" (single version)	3:48
6.	"Let the Music Do the Talking"	3:45
7.	"Walk This Way" (with Run-DMC)	5:09
8.	"Hangman Jury"	5:34
9.	"Dude (Looks Like a Lady)"	4:20
10.	"Rag Doll" (live)	4:13
11.	"Angel" (single version)	4:03
12.	"Monkey on My Back"	3:56
13.	"What It Takes" (CHR single edit)	4:06
14.	"Water Song/Janie's Got a Gun"	5:32
15.	"Going Down/Love in an Elevator"	5:39
Total length:		63:58

Disc three
No.	Title	Length
1.	"The Other Side" (single version)	4:05
2.	"Livin' on the Edge" (CHR edit)	5:40
3.	"Amazing" (CHR single edit)	4:12
4.	"Get a Grip"	3:57
5.	"Cryin'"	5:06
6.	"Eat the Rich"	4:10
7.	"Crazy" (radio edit)	4:04
8.	"Falling in Love (Is Hard on the Knees)"	3:26
9.	"Pink"	3:54
10.	"Nine Lives"	4:02
11.	"I Don't Want to Miss a Thing"	4:56
12.	"Jaded"	3:34
13.	"We All Fall Down"	5:12
14.	"Just Push Play" (radio remix)	3:10
Total length:		59:31

The following is the digital configuration of the 18 tracks on the single CD edition.

Single-disc edition
No.	Title	Length
1.	"Mama Kin"	4:26
2.	"Dream On"	4:25
3.	"Same Old Song and Dance" (single version)	3:02
4.	"Walk This Way"	3:39
5.	"Sweet Emotion"	4:35
6.	"Back in the Saddle"	4:41
7.	"Draw the Line" (original album version)	3:23
8.	"Dude (Looks Like a Lady)"	4:22
9.	"Angel" (single version)	4:04
10.	"Rag Doll" (live)	4:13
11.	"Water Song / Janie's Got a Gun"	5:32
12.	"What It Takes" (CHR single edit)	4:07
13.	"Going Down / Love in an Elevator"	5:39
14.	"Crazy" (radio edit)	4:03
15.	"Livin' on the Edge" (CHR edit)	5:41
16.	"Cryin'"	5:08
17.	"Pink"	3:53
18.	"I Don't Want to Miss a Thing"	4:57
Total length:		79:50

== Charts ==
Chart performance for Greatest Hits
Chart (2023)	Peak position
Austrian Albums (Ö3 Austria)	49
Belgian Albums (Ultratop Flanders)	104
Belgian Albums (Ultratop Wallonia)	103
Canadian Albums (Billboard)	85
French Albums (SNEP)	74
German Albums (Offizielle Top 100)	14
Irish Albums (IRMA)	100
Japanese Albums (Oricon)	15
Japanese Hot Albums (Billboard Japan)	10
New Zealand Albums (RMNZ)	37
Polish Albums (ZPAV)	74
Scottish Albums (OCC)	9
Spanish Albums (Promusicae)	55
Swiss Albums (Schweizer Hitparade)	8
UK Albums (OCC)	49
UK Rock & Metal Albums (OCC)	1
US Billboard 200	36
US Top Rock Albums (Billboard)	4
US Top Hard Rock Albums (Billboard)	1
