= Permanent Vacation Tour =

1987–88 concert tour by Aerosmith

- Tour by Aerosmith
- Associated album: Permanent Vacation
- Start date: October 16, 1987
- End date: September 15, 1988
- Legs: 5
- No. of shows: 148

Aerosmith concert chronology
- Done with Mirrors Tour (1985–1986); Permanent Vacation Tour (1987–1988); Pump Tour (1989–1990)

The Permanent Vacation Tour, was a headlining concert tour by American hard rock band Aerosmith, lasted from October 16, 1987, to September 15, 1988. It supported the band's commercially successful comeback album Permanent Vacation, released in September 1987.

== Background ==
The tour was the band's first since completing drug rehabilitation. Guns N' Roses, notorious for drug abuse at the time, was the supporting act for part of the tour, primarily during the summer of 1988. Aerosmith asked Guns to not do drugs in their presence, so they wouldn't relapse. "I told those guys, 'This is my dressing room and, if you whip out the coke, I'm going to have to leave,'" Steven Tyler recalled. "That was it. Then it was printed that we banned them from drinking backstage. Never."

The two bands had a similar style, musically and personality-wise, and were both on Geffen Records at the time. Upon their first meeting, the band members couldn't help but notice how much they resembled each other. Guns N' Roses' video for "Paradise City" included footage from a show in which they opened for Aerosmith and Deep Purple at Giants Stadium on August 16, 1988. Duff McKagan can be seen wearing an Aerosmith T-shirt in the video.

"Thank God we got to meet some people that weren't fucked up!" remarked Guns guitarist Izzy Stradlin. "It influenced me, big-time… cos Tyler and those guys, they were always like my rock idols… When we toured with them, I'd go out to watch and they'd sound fucking amazing! I thought, We're gonna have to really pull this shit together to keep up."

Extreme, Dokken and White Lion also filled opening slots on the tour.

During a show on this tour, Liv Tyler, aged 11 at the time, learned that her sister was Mia Tyler and her father was Steven Tyler.

== Setlist ==
The band consistently played six tracks from Permanent Vacation: the major singles "Dude (Looks Like a Lady)", "Angel", and "Rag Doll", as well as the rock radio hit "Hangman Jury", the rocking title track, and the Beatles cover "I'm Down". The band also played numerous songs from their classic 1973–1982 era. A typical setlist would be this:

1. "Toys in the Attic"
2. "Same Old Song and Dance
3. "Big Ten Inch Record"
4. "Dude (Looks Like a Lady)"
5. "Lightning Strikes"
6. "Rag Doll"
7. "Hangman Jury"
8. "Permanent Vacation"
9. "Angel"
10. "Back in the Saddle"
11. "Last Child"
12. "Draw the Line"
13. "Rats in the Cellar"
14. "One Way Street"
15. "Dream On"
16. "Train Kept A-Rollin'"
17. "Sweet Emotion"
18. "I'm Down"
19. "Walk This Way"

== Tour dates ==
List of 1987 concerts
| Date | City | Country | Venue | Tickets sold / available | Revenue |
|---|---|---|---|---|---|
| October 16, 1987 | Binghamton | United States | Broome County Veterans Memorial Arena | | |
| October 17, 1987 | Buffalo | United States | Buffalo Memorial Auditorium | 10,254 / 17,000 | $164,060 |
| October 19, 1987 | Syracuse | United States | Onondaga County War Memorial | | |
| October 20, 1987 | Toronto | Canada | Maple Leaf Gardens | 11,955 / 12,500 | $203,779 |
| October 22, 1987 | Montreal | Canada | Montreal Forum | | |
| October 24, 1987 | Rochester | United States | Rochester Community War Memorial | 10,718 / 10,718 | $166,276 |
| October 25, 1987 | Glens Falls | United States | Glens Falls Civic Center | 7,812 / 7,812 | $128,898 |
| October 27, 1987 | Portland | United States | Cumberland County Civic Center | 15,573 / 19,000 | $250,956 |
| October 28, 1987 | Portland | United States | Cumberland County Civic Center | 15,573 / 19,000 | $250,956 |
| October 30, 1987 | Providence | United States | Providence Civic Center | 28,350 / 28,350 | $467,775 |
| October 31, 1987 | Providence | United States | Providence Civic Center | 28,350 / 28,350 | $467,775 |
| November 1, 1987 | Springfield | United States | Springfield Civic Center | 10,227 / 10,227 | $165,000 |
| November 3, 1987 | New Haven | United States | New Haven Coliseum | 10,165 / 10,165 | $162,701 |
| November 5, 1987 | Pittsburgh | United States | Civic Arena | 13,326 / 16,000 | $223,210 |
| November 7, 1987 | Lake Placid | United States | Olympic Center | | |
| November 8, 1987 | Uniondale | United States | Nassau Coliseum | 15,122 / 16,822 | $263,587 |
| November 10, 1987 | Philadelphia | United States | The Spectrum | 17,504 / 17,504 | $261,876 |
| November 11, 1987 | Philadelphia | United States | The Spectrum | | |
| November 13, 1987 | East Rutherford | United States | Brendan Byrne Arena | 19,436 / 20,528 | $315,288 |
| November 14, 1987 | Richmond | United States | Richmond Coliseum | 10,407 / 12,500 | $150,330 |
| November 16, 1987 | Hampton | United States | Hampton Coliseum | 8,730 / 13,800 | $128,377 |
| November 17, 1987 | Roanoke | United States | Roanoke Civic Center | 7,374 / 8,064 | $116,704 |
| November 19, 1987 | Landover | United States | Capital Centre | 16,255 / 18,700 | $261,046 |
| November 20, 1987 | Bethlehem | United States | Stabler Arena | | |
| November 21, 1987 | Charleston | United States | Charleston Civic Center | | |
| November 22, 1987 | Raleigh | United States | Reynolds Coliseum | | |
| November 25, 1987 | Toledo | United States | Toledo Sports Arena | | |
| November 26, 1987 | Indianapolis | United States | Market Square Arena | 14,310 / 17,000 | $225,090 |
| November 27, 1987 | Cincinnati | United States | Cincinnati Gardens | 10,205 / 10,205 | $155,186 |
| November 29, 1987 | Richfield | United States | Richfield Coliseum | 15,577 / 18,000 | $250,763 |
| November 30, 1987 | Fort Wayne | United States | Allen County War Memorial Coliseum | 6,045 / 7,450 | $95,508 |
| December 2, 1987 | Rosemont | United States | Rosemont Horizon | 10,852 / 18,055 | $172,359 |
| December 3, 1987 | Columbus | United States | Battelle Hall | | |
| December 5, 1987 | Detroit | United States | Joe Louis Arena | 19,409 / 19,409 | $339,658 |
| December 6, 1987 | Saginaw | United States | Wendler Arena | 7,001 / 7,001 | $122,518 |
| December 8, 1987 | Milwaukee | United States | MECCA Arena | | |
| December 9, 1987 | St. Louis | United States | St. Louis Arena | 11,249 / 19,008 | $178,563 |
| December 11, 1987 | Omaha | United States | Omaha Civic Auditorium | 9,040 / 12,000 | $134,633 |
| December 12, 1987 | Saint Paul | United States | St. Paul Civic Center | 17,962 / 17,962 | $263,050 |
| December 13, 1987 | Madison | United States | Dane County Coliseum | 8,895 / 12,000 | $131,628 |
| December 27, 1987 | Augusta | United States | Augusta Civic Center | 7,206 / 8,225 | $108,328 |
| December 28, 1987 | Worcester | United States | The Centrum | 33,702 / 38,312 | $580,000 |
| December 30, 1987 | Worcester | United States | The Centrum | 33,702 / 38,312 | $580,000 |
| December 31, 1987 | Worcester | United States | The Centrum | 33,702 / 38,312 | $580,000 |

List of 1988 concerts
| Date | City | Country | Venue | Tickets sold / available | Revenue |
|---|---|---|---|---|---|
| January 16, 1988 | Seattle | United States | Seattle Center Coliseum | 13,768 / 13,768 | $240,940 |
| January 18, 1988 | Pullman | United States | Beasley Performing Arts Coliseum | 5,694 / 6,500 | $93,951 |
| January 20, 1988 | Vancouver | Canada | Pacific Coliseum | 12,778 / 14,000 | $190,212 |
| January 21, 1988 | Portland | United States | Memorial Coliseum | 8,772 / 12,000 | $134,738 |
| January 23, 1988 | Reno | United States | Lawlor Events Center | 6,456 / 7,500 | $109,752 |
| January 24, 1988 | Sacramento | United States | ARCO Arena | 8,722 / 10,000 | $152,635 |
| January 26, 1988 | Fresno | United States | Selland Arena | 7,207 / 10,748 | $118,916 |
| January 27, 1988 | Inglewood | United States | The Forum | 14,728 / 14,728 | $243,950 |
| January 29, 1988 | Daly City | United States | Cow Palace | | |
| January 30, 1988 | Oakland | United States | Oakland–Alameda County Coliseum | | |
| February 1, 1988 | San Diego | United States | San Diego Sports Arena | 11,713 / 11,713 | $197,085 |
| February 2, 1988 | Paradise | United States | Thomas & Mack Center | 7,299 / 12,432 | $117,266 |
| February 4, 1988 | Long Beach | United States | Long Beach Arena | 26,124 / 26,124 | $439,058 |
| February 6, 1988 | Long Beach | United States | Long Beach Arena | 26,124 / 26,124 | $439,058 |
| February 7, 1988 | Phoenix | United States | Arizona Veterans Memorial Coliseum | 14,000 / 14,000 | $226,291 |
| February 8, 1988 | Tucson | United States | Tucson Community Center | 9,111 / 9,111 | $134,190 |
| February 10, 1988 | El Paso | United States | The Special Events Center | 7,075 / 8,268 | $105,013 |
| February 12, 1988 | Austin | United States | Frank Erwin Center | 8,870 / 13,251 | $138,193 |
| February 13, 1988 | Dallas | United States | Reunion Arena | 15,354 / 15,965 | $255,483 |
| February 15, 1988 | Houston | United States | The Summit | 10,829 / 12,061 | $178,605 |
| February 16, 1988 | San Antonio | United States | Freeman Coliseum | | |
| February 18, 1988 | Tulsa | United States | Tulsa Convention Center | 8,358 / 8,992 | $135,523 |
| February 19, 1988 | Kansas City | United States | Kemper Arena | 14,756 / 16,935 | $238,177 |
| February 21, 1988 | Carbondale | United States | SIU Arena | | |
| February 22, 1988 | Cedar Rapids | United States | Five Seasons Center | 10,000 / 10,000 | $159,207 |
| February 24, 1988 | Valley Center | United States | Kansas Coliseum | 8,493 / 8,493 | $133,997 |
| February 25, 1988 | Oklahoma City | United States | Myriad Convention Center | 8,268 / 15,291 | $136,973 |
| February 27, 1988 | Shreveport | United States | Hirsch Memorial Coliseum | 10,000 / 10,000 | $160,000 |
| February 28, 1988 | New Orleans | United States | Lakefront Arena | 8,768 / 8,768 | $139,105 |
| March 21, 1988 | Roanoke | United States | Roanoke Civic Center | 6,889 / 11,000 | $99,397 |
| March 23, 1988 | Greensboro | United States | Greensboro Coliseum | 6,534 / 15,780 | $101,029 |
| March 25, 1988 | Charlotte | United States | Charlotte Coliseum | 11,294 / 11,900 | $186,351 |
| March 26, 1988 | Columbia | United States | Carolina Coliseum | 6,897 / 12,456 | $104,560 |
| March 28, 1988 | Savannah | United States | Savannah Civic Center | 6,225 / 8,532 | $97,235 |
| March 29, 1988 | Cullowhee | United States | Ramsey Center | 7,826 / 8,556 | |
| March 31, 1988 | Knoxville | United States | James White Civic Coliseum | 7,319 / 7,319 | $112,712 |
| April 1, 1988 | Nashville | United States | Nashville Municipal Auditorium | 9,900 / 9,900 | $154,496 |
| April 2, 1988 | Little Rock | United States | Barton Coliseum | 9,911 / 9,911 | $158,576 |
| April 5, 1988 | Memphis | United States | Mid-South Coliseum | 9,061 / 12,035 | $135,984 |
| April 6, 1988 | Jackson | United States | Mississippi Coliseum | 10,200 / 10,200 | $145,995 |
| April 8, 1988 | Atlanta | United States | Omni Coliseum | 14,118 / 15,291 | $247,065 |
| April 9, 1988 | Birmingham | United States | Birmingham–Jefferson Civic Center | 14,309 / 14,309 | $236,099 |
| April 11, 1988 | Huntsville | United States | Von Braun Civic Center | 8,446 / 10,000 | $135,136 |
| April 12, 1988 | Chattanooga | United States | UTC Arena | 5,479 / 11,648 | $87,252 |
| April 14, 1988 | Biloxi | United States | Mississippi Coast Coliseum | 9,240 / 9,240 | $139,755 |
| April 15, 1988 | Tallahassee | United States | Tallahassee-Leon County Civic Center | 8,128 / 10,004 | $117,570 |
| April 16, 1988 | Jacksonville | United States | Jacksonville Memorial Coliseum | 8,765 / 11,676 | $127,650 |
| April 17, 1988 | Pembroke Pines | United States | Hollywood Sportatorium | 11,193 / 12,937 | $161,130 |
| April 20, 1988 | Lakeland | United States | Lakeland Civic Center | 9,310 / 10,000 | $134,535 |
| April 22, 1988 | North Fort Myers | United States | Lee County Civic Center | | |
| April 29, 1988 | Johnson City | United States | Freedom Hall Civic Center | 9,070 / 9,070 | $145,514 |
| April 30, 1988 | Louisville | United States | Freedom Hall | 11,000 / 19,293 | $172,266 |
| May 2, 1988 | Trotwood | United States | Hara Arena | 8,000 / 8,000 | $131,093 |
| May 3, 1988 | Evansville | United States | Roberts Municipal Stadium | 9,036 / 12,000 | $318,831 |
| May 5, 1988 | Peoria | United States | Peoria Civic Center | 8,069 / 9,667 | $127,562 |
| May 6, 1988 | Rochester | United States | Mayo Civic Center | 7,012 / 7,012 | $102,123 |
| May 8, 1988 | Winnipeg | Canada | Winnipeg Arena | 9,612 / 12,443 | $161,980 |
| May 9, 1988 | Regina | Canada | Agridome | 4,702 / 8,770 | $161,980 |
| May 11, 1988 | Saskatoon | Canada | Saskatchewan Place | 5,185 / 9,914 | $65,777 |
| May 12, 1988 | Edmonton | Canada | Northlands Coliseum | | |
| May 14, 1988 | Calgary | Canada | Olympic Saddledome | 10,197 / 17,305 | $155,140 |
| May 17, 1988 | Boise | United States | BSU Pavilion | 6,206 / 9,150 | $89,094 |
| May 18, 1988 | Salt Lake City | United States | Salt Palace | 10,577 / 12,100 | $166,588 |
| May 20, 1988 | Denver | United States | McNichols Sports Arena | 8,361 / 18,000 | $150,619 |
| May 21, 1988 | Pueblo | United States | Colorado State Fair | 8,227 / 12,000 | $132,645 |
| May 22, 1988 | Albuquerque | United States | Tingley Coliseum | 6,747 / 10,000 | $112,910 |
| June 17, 1988 | Nagoya | Japan | Nagoya-Shi Kokaido | | |
| June 20, 1988 | Osaka | Japan | Osaka Castle Hall | | |
| June 21, 1988 | Tokyo | Japan | Nippon Budokan | | |
| June 23, 1988 | Tokyo | Japan | Nippon Budokan | | |
| June 24, 1988 | Tokyo | Japan | Nippon Budokan | | |
| June 26, 1988 | Yokohama | Japan | Yokohama Cultural Gymnasium | | |
| July 2, 1988 | Honolulu | United States | Neal S. Blaisdell Arena | 13,313 / 17,442 | $231,618 |
| July 3, 1988 | Honolulu | United States | Neal S. Blaisdell Arena | 13,313 / 17,442 | $231,618 |
| July 17, 1988 | Hoffman Estates | United States | Poplar Creek Music Theater | 23,674 / 25,202 | $348,714 |
| July 19, 1988 | Richfield | United States | Richfield Coliseum | 17,819 / 19,410 | $303,835 |
| July 20, 1988 | Wheeling | United States | Wheeling Civic Center | | |
| July 22, 1988 | Cape Girardeau | United States | Show Me Center | | |
| July 24, 1988 | Dallas | United States | Coca-Cola Starplex Amphitheatre | 14,440 / 14,440 | $204,668 |
| July 26, 1988 | Bonner Springs | United States | Sandstone Amphitheater | 13,374 / 15,999 | $224,037 |
| July 27, 1988 | Ames | United States | Hilton Coliseum | 12,107 / 15,000 | |
| July 29, 1988 | East Troy | United States | Alpine Valley Music Theatre | 19,473 / 34,000 | |
| July 30, 1988 | Mears | United States | Val Du Lakes Amphitheatre | | |
| August 1, 1988 | Cincinnati | United States | Riverbend Music Center | | |
| August 2, 1988 | Indianapolis | United States | Market Square Arena | 16,800 / 16,800 | $254,022 |
| August 4, 1988 | Philadelphia | United States | The Spectrum | 35,730 / 35,730 | $569,525 |
| August 5, 1988 | Philadelphia | United States | The Spectrum | 35,730 / 35,730 | $569,525 |
| August 6, 1988 | Saratoga Springs | United States | Saratoga Performing Arts Center | 19,455 / 19,455 | $347,254 |
| August 7, 1988 | Middletown | United States | Orange County Fairgrounds | 15,645 / 15,645 | $246,028 |
| August 9, 1988 | Weedsport | United States | Cayuga County Fair Speedway | | |
| August 11, 1988 | Clarkston | United States | Pine Knob Music Theatre | 44,153 / 44,153 | $790,165 |
| August 12, 1988 | Clarkston | United States | Pine Knob Music Theatre | 44,153 / 44,153 | $790,165 |
| August 13, 1988 | Clarkston | United States | Pine Knob Music Theatre | 44,153 / 44,153 | $790,165 |
| August 16, 1988 | East Rutherford | United States | Giants Stadium | 55,799 / 63,000 | $1,224,292 |
| August 17, 1988 | Columbia | United States | Merriweather Post Pavilion | 16,516 / 16,516 | $265,550 |
| August 19, 1988 | Portland | United States | Cumberland County Civic Center | | |
| August 21, 1988 | Toronto | Canada | Exhibition Stadium | 18,000 / 25,000 | $356,421 |
| August 22, 1988 | Ottawa | Canada | Lansdowne Park | | |
| August 24, 1988 | Mansfield | United States | Great Woods Center for the Performing Arts | 45,780 / 45,780 | $794,606 |
| August 25, 1988 | Mansfield | United States | Great Woods Center for the Performing Arts | 45,780 / 45,780 | $794,606 |
| August 26, 1988 | Mansfield | United States | Great Woods Center for the Performing Arts | 45,780 / 45,780 | $794,606 |
| August 28, 1988 | Thornville | United States | Buckeye Lake Music Center | 19,137 / 30,000 | $351,094 |
| August 30, 1988 | Plains Township | United States | Pocono Downs | 22,869 / 22,869 | $444,851 |
| August 31, 1988 | Pittsburgh | United States | Civic Arena | 16,658 / 16,658 | $292,503 |
| September 2, 1988 | Antioch | United States | Starwood Amphitheatre | 16,750 / 16,750 | $253,194 |
| September 3, 1988 | St. Louis | United States | St. Louis Arena | 16,392 / 16,392 | $281,015 |
| September 8, 1988 | Concord | United States | Concord Pavilion | | |
| September 9, 1988 | Sacramento | United States | California Exposition & State Fair | 12,200 / 12,200 | $225,700 |
| September 10, 1988 | Mountain View | United States | Shoreline Amphitheatre | 20,000 / 20,000 | $343,634 |
| September 12, 1988 | Chandler | United States | Compton Terrace | 22,827 / 22,827 | $365,861 |
| September 14, 1988 | Costa Mesa | United States | Pacific Amphitheatre | 37,528 / 37,528 | $670,030 |
| September 15, 1988 | Costa Mesa | United States | Pacific Amphitheatre | 37,528 / 37,528 | $670,030 |
