= Pump Tour =

1989–90 concert tour by Aerosmith

- Tour by Aerosmith
- Associated album: Pump
- Start date: October 18, 1989
- End date: October 15, 1990
- Legs: 9
- No. of shows: 164

Aerosmith concert chronology
- Permanent Vacation Tour (1987–1988); Pump Tour (1989–1990); Get a Grip Tour (1993–1994)

The Pump Tour was a concert tour by American rock band Aerosmith that lasted twelve months, from mid-October 1989 to mid-October 1990. The tour was put on in support of the band's second consecutive multi-platinum album Pump, released in September 1989.

== Background ==
The Pump Tour saw the band continue its successful streak, on the heels of 1987's Permanent Vacation and its associated tour. During the course of the tour, the band charted four Top 40 singles from Pump. By the end of the tour, Pump had sold four million copies, eventually selling seven million copies.

This tour was notable as it saw Aerosmith's first return to Europe since 1977, as well as the band's first-ever performances in Australia. In addition, this tour saw the band tour North America on numerous legs, as well as perform a series of dates in Japan.

Special performances on The Howard Stern Show, Saturday Night Live, and MTV Unplugged were interspersed during the course of the tour.

Opening acts on this tour included Skid Row, Joan Jett, The Cult, Poison, Warrant, Metallica, The Black Crowes, and The Quireboys. Some of these acts were regular openers, while some opened for Aerosmith only at specific festivals or stadium shows.

During the tour, the band got to meet some of their idols. Steven Tyler met Mick Jagger backstage at a Rolling Stones concert, only the second time he had met him, and the first time he met him while sober. In addition, the band met Robert Plant and Jimmy Page, who saw the band perform on separate occasions in England. At one show, The Monsters of Rock festival at Castle Donington Leicestershire UK, Page jammed with the band on "Train Kept A-Rollin'", and at another show, he played an extended set with the band at the Marquee Club in London.

For this tour, the band employed the use of a Citation II private plane, which the band named "Aeroforce One". The plane was formerly used by Philippine dictator Ferdinand Marcos.

In September 1990, towards the end of the tour, A&R man John Kalodner remarked how Aerosmith were "maybe the biggest band in the world", thinking "Nobody else is this good right now."

== Tour dates ==
Date	City	Country	Venue	Tickets Sold / Available	Revenue
Europe
October 18, 1989	Cologne	West Germany	Sporthalle		
October 20, 1989	Florence	Italy	Palasport		
October 21, 1989	Milan	Italy	Palatrussardi		
October 24, 1989	Paris	France	Zénith de Paris		
October 25, 1989	Brussels	Belgium	Forest National		
October 27, 1989	Arnhem	Netherlands	Rijnhal		
October 29, 1989	Munich	West Germany	Olympiahalle		
October 30, 1989	Würzburg	West Germany	Carl-Diem-Halle		
November 1, 1989	West Berlin	West Germany	Deutschlandhalle		
November 2, 1989	Münster	West Germany	Halle Münsterland		
November 4, 1989	Hanover	West Germany	Eilenriedehalle		
November 5, 1989	Frankfurt	West Germany	Festhalle Frankfurt		
November 7, 1989	Böblingen	West Germany	Sporthalle		
November 8, 1989	Mannheim	West Germany	Maimarkthalle		
November 10, 1989	Copenhagen	Denmark	K.B. Hallen		
November 11, 1989	Stockholm	Sweden	Johanneshovs Isstadion		
November 14, 1989	London	England	Hammersmith Odeon		
November 15, 1989	London	England	Hammersmith Odeon		
November 17, 1989	London	England	Wembley Arena		
November 18, 1989	Birmingham	England	National Exhibition Centre		
November 19, 1989	Birmingham	England	National Exhibition Centre		
November 21, 1989	Newcastle upon Tyne	England	Newcastle City Hall		
November 22, 1989	Livingston	Scotland	Livingston Forum		
November 24, 1989	Belfast	Northern Ireland	Nugent Hall		
November 25, 1989	Dublin	Ireland	Point Theatre		
November 26, 1989	London	England	Wembley Arena		
North America
December 15, 1989	Charleston	United States	Charleston Civic Center	9,000 / 12,000	$165,438
December 17, 1989	Landover	United States	Capital Centre	17,399 / 17,399	$391,477
December 18, 1989	Wheeling	United States	Wheeling Civic Center		
December 20, 1989	Roanoke	United States	Roanoke Civic Center		
December 21, 1989	Norfolk	United States	The Scope		
December 22, 1989	Richmond	United States	Richmond Coliseum		
December 27, 1989	Springfield	United States	Springfield Civic Center	16,928 / 18,300	$366,345
December 28, 1989	New Haven	United States	New Haven Coliseum	10,470 / 10,470	$228,375
December 30, 1989	Boston	United States	Boston Garden	38,740 / 38,740	$889,245
December 31, 1989	Boston	United States	Boston Garden	38,740 / 38,740	$889,245
January 1, 1990	Boston	United States	Boston Garden	38,740 / 38,740	$889,245
January 3, 1990	Ottawa	Canada	Ottawa Civic Centre		
January 4, 1990	Montreal	Canada	Montreal Forum	8,592 / 10,233	$174,664
January 6, 1990	Toronto	Canada	SkyDome	32,802 / 32,802	$684,195
January 7, 1990	Erie	United States	Erie Civic Center		
January 9, 1990	Springfield	United States	Springfield Civic Center	(Note: The score data is representative of both shows at the Springfield Civic Center on December 27 and January 9.)	
January 10, 1990	Glens Falls	United States	Glens Falls Civic Center	8,100 / 8,100	$182,250
January 12, 1990	Providence	United States	Providence Civic Center	13,800 / 13,800	$310,500
January 13, 1990	Rochester	United States	Rochester Community War Memorial	11,000 / 11,000	$217,608
January 15, 1990	Uniondale	United States	Nassau Veterans Memorial Coliseum		
January 16, 1990	Binghamton	United States	Broome County Veterans Memorial Arena		
January 18, 1990	Uniondale	United States	Nassau Veterans Memorial Coliseum		
January 19, 1990	Philadelphia	United States	Spectrum		
January 21, 1990	Philadelphia	United States	Spectrum		
January 22, 1990	East Rutherford	United States	Brendan Byrne Arena	20,368 / 20,368	$417,773
January 24, 1990	Syracuse	United States	Onondaga War Memorial		
January 25, 1990	Pittsburgh	United States	Civic Arena	16,635 / 16,635	$300,261
January 27, 1990	Louisville	United States	Freedom Hall	16,101 / 18,500	$313,970
January 28, 1990	Hershey	United States	Hersheypark Arena		
February 20, 1990	Austin	United States	Frank Erwin Center	13,050 / 15,564	$228,612
February 22, 1990	Dallas	United States	Reunion Arena	17,092 / 17,092	$334,280
February 24, 1990	Albuquerque	United States	Tingley Coliseum	11,800 / 11,800	$206,500
February 25, 1990	Las Cruces	United States	Pan American Center	10,569 / 12,007	$180,618
February 27, 1990	Tucson	United States	Tucson Convention Center Arena	9,081 / 9,231	$170,606
February 28, 1990	Chandler	United States	Compton Terrace	13,897 / 15,000	$271,006
March 2, 1990	San Diego	United States	San Diego Sports Arena	13,166 / 13,166	$270,921
March 3, 1990	Inglewood	United States	Great Western Forum	48,507 / 48,507	$1,051,200
March 5, 1990	Inglewood	United States	Great Western Forum	48,507 / 48,507	$1,051,200
March 6, 1990	Inglewood	United States	Great Western Forum	48,507 / 48,507	$1,051,200
March 8, 1990	Reno	United States	Lawlor Events Center		
March 9, 1990	Daly City	United States	Cow Palace	31,000 / 31,000	$697,500
March 10, 1990	Daly City	United States	Cow Palace	31,000 / 31,000	$697,500
March 12, 1990	Sacramento	United States	ARCO Arena	17,031 / 17,031	$383,198
March 14, 1990	Tacoma	United States	Tacoma Dome	23,002 / 23,002	$505,050
March 15, 1990	Portland	United States	Memorial Coliseum	11,903 / 11,903	$239,356
March 17, 1990	Vancouver	Canada	Pacific Coliseum	15,976 / 15,976	$339,368
March 19, 1990	Edmonton	Canada	Northlands Coliseum	14,938 / 14,938	$313,282
March 20, 1990	Calgary	Canada	Olympic Saddledome	14,682 / 14,939	$295,702
March 22, 1990	Saskatoon	Canada	Saskatchewan Place		
March 24, 1990	Winnipeg	Canada	Winnipeg Arena		
March 25, 1990	Regina	Canada	Regina Agridome		
March 27, 1990	Billings	United States	MetraPark Arena		
March 28, 1990	Rapid City	United States	Rushmore Plaza Civic Center		
March 30, 1990	Casper	United States	Casper Events Center		
March 31, 1990	Salt Lake City	United States	Salt Palace	12,972 / 12,972	$252,954
April 17, 1990	Jacksonville	United States	Jacksonville Memorial Coliseum	9,105 / 10,000	$179,824
April 19, 1990	Tampa	United States	USF Sun Dome	16,334 / 16,334	$371,599
April 20, 1990	Tampa	United States	USF Sun Dome	16,334 / 16,334	$371,599
April 22, 1990	Miami	United States	Miami Arena	14,706 / 14,706	$334,562
April 23, 1990	North Fort Myers	United States	Lee County Civic Center	9,069 / 9,069	$179,113
April 25, 1990	Orlando	United States	Orlando Arena	10,261 / 11,500	$233,438
April 27, 1990	Chapel Hill	United States	Dean Smith Center	14,647 / 19,268	$317,768
April 28, 1990	Charlotte	United States	Charlotte Coliseum	14,315 / 15,936	$312,660
April 29, 1990	Columbia	United States	Carolina Coliseum	8,559 / 10,500	$180,203
May 1, 1990	Johnson City	United States	Freedom Hall Civic Center		
May 2, 1990	Lexington	United States	Rupp Arena	9,621 / 14,000	$187,610
May 4, 1990	Knoxville	United States	Thompson–Boling Arena	11,566 / 14,000	$225,537
May 5, 1990	Atlanta	United States	Omni Coliseum	25,442 / 34,318	$572,445
May 6, 1990	Atlanta	United States	Omni Coliseum	25,442 / 34,318	$572,445
May 9, 1990	Savannah	United States	Savannah Civic Center		
May 10, 1990	Tallahassee	United States	Leon County Civic Center		
May 12, 1990	Birmingham	United States	Birmingham–Jefferson Civic Center	16,903 / 16,903	$329,635
May 13, 1990	Jackson	United States	Mississippi Coliseum	9,565 / 10,000	$176,953
May 15, 1990	New Orleans	United States	Lakefront Arena	10,601 / 10,601	$189,810
May 16, 1990	Shrepevort	United States	Hirsch Memorial Coliseum	9,609 / 9,609	$172,328
May 18, 1990	Nashville	United States	Starwood Amphitheatre		
May 19, 1990	Memphis	United States	Mid-South Coliseum	10,637 / 10,637	$196,785
May 21, 1990	Huntsville	United States	Von Braun Civic Center		
May 22, 1990	Chattanooga	United States	UTC Arena	5,707 / 11,648	$99,345
May 24, 1990	Columbus	United States	Cooper Stadium	16,800 / 19,000	$375,575
May 25, 1990	Auburn Hills	United States	The Palace of Auburn Hills	38,506 / 38,506	$866,385
May 27, 1990	Auburn Hills	United States	The Palace of Auburn Hills	38,506 / 38,506	$866,385
May 28, 1990	Noblesville	United States	Deer Creek Music Center		
June 17, 1990	Bethlehem	United States	Stabler Arena	5,515 / 5,515	$122,760
June 19, 1990	Middletown	United States	Orange County Speedway		
June 20, 1990	Moosic	United States	Lackawanna County Stadium	12,797 / 15,000	$282,308
June 22, 1990	Old Orchard Beach	United States	Seashore Performing Arts Center	12,123 / 15,000	$261,283
June 23, 1990	Bristol	United States	Lake Compounce	16,849 / 20,000	$354,990
June 25, 1990	Mansfield	United States	Great Woods		
June 26, 1990	Mansfield	United States	Great Woods		
June 27, 1990	Saratoga Springs	United States	Saratoga Performing Arts Center		
June 29, 1990	Toronto	Canada	Exhibition Stadium	27,314 / 30,000	$763,987
June 30, 1990	Rochester	United States	Silver Stadium		
July 2, 1990	Cuyahoga Falls	United States	Blossom Music Center		
July 3, 1990	Cuyahoga Falls	United States	Blossom Music Center		
July 5, 1990	Kalamazoo	United States	Wings Stadium		
July 6, 1990	Charlevoix	United States	Castle Farms	9,876 / 14,000	$204,481
July 8, 1990	Peoria	United States	Peoria Civic Center		
July 9, 1990	Omaha	United States	Omaha Civic Auditorium		
July 11, 1990	Bonner Springs	United States	Sandstone Amphitheater		
July 12, 1990	Valley Center	United States	Kansas Coliseum		
July 14, 1990	Oklahoma City	United States	Myriad Convention Center		
July 15, 1990	Dallas	United States	Coca-Cola Starplex Amphitheatre	12,676 / 20,000	$282,408
July 17, 1990	St. Louis	United States	St. Louis Arena		
July 18, 1990	Cincinnati	United States	Riverbend Music Center		
July 20, 1990	Tinley Park	United States	World Music Theater	26,563 / 28,127	$603,433
July 21, 1990	East Troy	United States	Alpine Valley Music Theatre		
July 23, 1990	Burgettstown	United States	Coca-Cola Star Lake Amphitheater		
July 24, 1990	Philadelphia	United States	The Spectrum	17,872 / 17,872	$359,111
July 26, 1990	East Rutherford	United States	Brendan Byrne Arena		
July 27, 1990	Norfolk	United States	Norfolk Scope		
July 28, 1990	Landover	United States	Capital Centre		
Europe
August 15, 1990	Dublin	Ireland	Point Theatre		
August 18, 1990	Castle Donington	England	Donington Park		
August 20, 1990	London	England	Marquee Club		
August 23, 1990	West Berlin	West Germany	Waldbühne		
August 25, 1990	Dortmund	West Germany	Westfalenhalle		
August 26, 1990	Utrecht	Netherlands	Stadion Galgenwaard		
August 30, 1990	Bologna	Italy	Arena Parco Nord		
August 31, 1990	Winterthur	Switzerland	Winterthurer Musikfestwochen Festival		
September 1, 1990	Mannheim	West Germany	Maimarkt-Gelände		
September 3, 1990	Paris	France	Vincennes Racecourse		
North America
September 8, 1990	Las Vegas	United States	Hard Rock Cafe		
Asia
September 12, 1990	Osaka	Japan	Osaka Castle Hall		
September 14, 1990	Nagoya	Japan	Aichi Prefectural Gymnasium		
September 16, 1990	Yokohama	Japan	Yokohama Arena		
September 17, 1990	Tokyo	Japan	Nippon Budokan		
September 19, 1990	Tokyo	Japan	Nippon Budokan		
September 20, 1990	Tokyo	Japan	Nippon Budokan		
September 22, 1990	Tokyo	Japan	Yoyogi National Gymnasium		
Australia
September 29, 1990	Adelaide	Australia	Memorial Drive Park		
October 1, 1990	Melbourne	Australia	National Tennis Centre at Flinders Park		
October 2, 1990	Melbourne	Australia	National Tennis Centre at Flinders Park		
October 5, 1990	Brisbane	Australia	Brisbane Entertainment Centre		
October 7, 1990	Canberra	Australia	Bruce Stadium		
October 10, 1990	Sydney	Australia	Sydney Entertainment Centre		
October 11, 1990	Sydney	Australia	Sydney Entertainment Centre		
October 15, 1990	Perth	Australia	Perth Entertainment Centre		

== Setlist ==
Average set:

1. "Heart's Done Time"
2. "Young Lust"
3. "F.I.N.E."
4. "Monkey on My Back"
5. "Don't Get Mad, Get Even"
6. "Janie's Got a Gun"
7. "Permanent Vacation"
8. "Mama Kin"
9. "What It Takes"
10. "Voodoo Medicine Man"
11. "Red House" (The Jimi Hendrix Experience cover)
12. "Draw the Line"
13. "Rag Doll"
14. "Sweet Emotion"
15. "Dude (Looks Like a Lady)"
16. "Dream On"
17. "Love in an Elevator"

Encore:

1. "Train Kept A-Rollin'" (Tiny Bradshaw cover)
2. "Walk This Way"
