= Get a Grip Tour =

1993–94 concert tour by Aerosmith

- Tour by Aerosmith
- Associated album: Get a Grip; Big Ones
- Start date: June 2, 1993
- End date: December 19, 1994
- Legs: 13
- No. of shows: 240

Aerosmith concert chronology
- Pump Tour (1989–1990); Get a Grip Tour (1993–1994); Nine Lives Tour (1997–1999)

The Get a Grip Tour was a concert tour by American hard rock band Aerosmith that lasted over eighteen months, from early June 1993 to mid-December 1994. The tour was put on in support of the band's third consecutive multi-platinum album Get a Grip, released in April 1993.

== Background ==
The Get a Grip Tour began June 2, 1993 in Topeka, Kansas and ended December 19, 1994 at the band's Mama Kin Music Hall in Boston, Massachusetts. It included approximately 240 shows, alongside special performances. To date, it is the second-longest tour in the band's history, eclipsed only by the Nine Lives Tour, which lasted for three years. However, it holds the record for the most shows performed by Aerosmith on a single tour.

The band played multiple legs across North America, Europe, Japan, and Central and South America. The tour included their first performances in Central and South America, as well as European nations including Romania, Hungary, Poland, Russia, Turkey, Israel, Spain, Finland, Norway, the Czech Republic, and Austria. "Someone said, 'You've never been to South America,'" recalled Steven Tyler. "We said, 'This is the end of the tour – no more gigs.' But then they said $2 million… and you think, 'Okay, that's the worry taken out of Christmas.'"

Interspersed among regular show dates were performances on television shows such as Saturday Night Live, Late Show with David Letterman, MTV's Most Wanted, the MTV Video Music Awards, the Grammy Awards, and the MTV Europe Music Awards. The band also played club shows, in Los Angeles, London – as a surprise – Sioux Falls, South Dakota after a concert there.

At the Woodstock '94 festival in August 1994, the band closed the show on Saturday night, taking the stage at 1:15am to a crowd of 350,000. They were supposed to start at midnight, but a heavy downpour delayed the start time. Steven Tyler and Joey Kramer had attended the original Woodstock Festival in 1969.

Opening acts on the tour included Megadeth, Mighty Mighty Bosstones, Cry of Love, Jackyl, 4 Non Blondes, Soul Asylum, Therapy?, Collective Soul, Extreme, Brother Cane, Mr. Big, and Robert Plant in Argentina.

Megadeth opened the first shows in June, but was fired on July 17, after the band overheard Dave Mustaine talking poorly of Aerosmith in a radio interview: "We think we oughta be headlining, but we don't mind because everyone knows this is Aerosmith's last hurrah." Steven Tyler replied, "Dave, we'd like to help you out. Which way did you come in?" And it turned out to not be "Aerosmith's last hurrah": Aerosmith went on to stage fourteen successful tours, release five top five albums, chart five singles to the Billboard Hot 100 (including a #1 hit), and chart sixteen singles to the Mainstream Rock Tracks chart over the next 20 years.

By the end of the tour, Get a Grip had sold twelve million records worldwide, including six million in the United States alone (eventually seven million), charted four Top 40 hits, and won the band two Grammys, four MTV Video Music Awards, two People's Choice Awards, two American Music Awards, and a Billboard Music Award.

The Geffen compilation Big Ones was released in November 1994. Its new songs "Blind Man" and "Walk on Water" were included in the setlist for the final days of the tour. Those two tracks were recorded at a hotel on the island of Capri in July 1994, after the band's summer dates in Europe.

During the show in Costa Rica on November 10, 1994, a fan was killed when the gates of the stadium were opened. The band had no idea this had happened and played the show. After learning of the death, they sent condolences through local networks for family and friends of the victim.

The tour closed at the band's recently opened Mama Kin Music Hall in Boston on December 19, 1994. Heavy on 1970s classics, the show was broadcast on radio across North America.

== Set list ==
1. "Intro"
2. "Eat the Rich"
3. "Toys in the Attic"
4. "Fever"
5. "What it Takes"
6. "Amazing"
7. "Rag Doll"
8. "Cryin'"
9. "Mama Kin"
10. "Boogie Man"
11. "Shut Up and Dance"
12. "Walk on Down"
13. "Stop Messin' Around"
14. "Janie's Got a Gun"
15. "Love in an Elevator"
16. "Dude (Looks Like a Lady)"
17. "Sweet Emotion"
18. "Dream On"
19. "Livin' on the Edge"
20. "Walk This Way"

== Tour dates ==
Date	City	Country	Venue
North America
June 2, 1993	Topeka	United States	Landon Arena
June 4, 1993	Oklahoma City	United States	Myriad Convention Center
June 6, 1993	Omaha	United States	Omaha Civic Auditorium
June 7, 1993	Sioux Falls	United States	Sioux Falls Arena
June 9, 1993	Rapid City	United States	Rushmore Plaza Civic Center
June 10, 1993	Billings	United States	MetraPark Arena
June 12, 1993	Fargo	United States	Fargodome
June 13, 1993	Minneapolis	United States	Target Center
June 15, 1993	Cedar Rapids	United States	Five Seasons Center
June 16, 1993	Peoria	United States	Peoria Civic Center
June 18, 1993	Auburn Hills	United States	The Palace of Auburn Hills
June 19, 1993	Mears	United States	Val Du Lakes Amphitheatre
June 21, 1993	Cincinnati	United States	Riverbend Music Center
June 22, 1993	Fort Wayne	United States	Allen County War Memorial Coliseum
June 23, 1993	Noblesville	United States	Deer Creek Music Center
June 25, 1993	Maryland Heights	United States	Riverport Amphitheatre
June 26, 1993	Tinley Park	United States	World Music Theater
June 28, 1993	Memphis	United States	Pyramid Arena
June 29, 1993	Antioch	United States	Starwood Amphitheatre
July 1, 1993	Richfield	United States	Richfield Coliseum
July 2, 1993	Burgettstown	United States	Coca-Cola Star Lake Amphitheater
July 4, 1993	East Troy	United States	Alpine Valley Music Theatre
July 14, 1993	Birmingham	United States	Birmingham-Jefferson Civic Center
July 15, 1993	Biloxi	United States	Mississippi Coast Coliseum
July 17, 1993	The Woodlands	United States	Cynthia Woods Mitchell Pavilion
July 18, 1993	Dallas	United States	Coca-Cola Starplex Amphitheatre
July 19, 1993	The Woodlands	United States	Cynthia Woods Mitchell Pavilion
July 21, 1993	Lubbock	United States	Lubbock Municipal Coliseum
July 23, 1993	El Paso	United States	El Paso County Coliseum
July 24, 1993	Albuquerque	United States	Tingley Coliseum
July 26, 1993	Greenwood Village	United States	Fiddler's Green Amphitheatre
July 27, 1993	Greenwood Village	United States	Fiddler's Green Amphitheatre
July 29, 1993	Chandler	United States	Compton Terrace
July 31, 1993	Costa Mesa	United States	Pacific Amphitheatre
August 1, 1993	San Diego	United States	San Diego Sports Arena
August 3, 1993	Paradise	United States	Thomas & Mack Center
August 4, 1993	Inglewood	United States	Great Western Forum
August 6, 1993	Mountain View	United States	Shoreline Amphitheatre
August 7, 1993	Sacramento	United States	Cal Expo Amphitheatre
August 9, 1993	Boise	United States	BSU Pavilion
August 10, 1993	Salt Lake City	United States	Delta Center
August 12, 1993	Portland	United States	Memorial Coliseum
August 13, 1993	Seattle	United States	Seattle Center Coliseum
August 14, 1993	Vancouver	Canada	Pacific Coliseum
August 16, 1993	Edmonton	Canada	Northlands Coliseum
August 17, 1993	Calgary	Canada	Olympic Saddledome
August 26, 1993	Mansfield	United States	Great Woods
August 27, 1993	Mansfield	United States	Great Woods
August 29, 1993	Ottawa	Canada	Landsdowne Park Stadium
August 30, 1993	Toronto	Canada	CNE Grandstand
September 4, 1993	Wantagh	United States	Jones Beach Theater
September 5, 1993	Wantagh	United States	Jones Beach Theater
September 6, 1993	Foxborough	United States	Foxboro Stadium
September 7, 1993	Binghamton	United States	Broome County Veterans Memorial Arena
September 8, 1993	Darien	United States	Darien Lake Performing Arts Center
September 10, 1993	Landover	United States	USAir Arena
September 11, 1993	East Rutherford	United States	Brendan Byrne Arena
September 13, 1993	Providence	United States	Providence Civic Center
September 17, 1993	Philadelphia	United States	The Spectrum
September 18, 1993	Albany	United States	Knickerbocker Arena
September 21, 1993	Amherst	United States	Mullins Center
September 22, 1993	Philadelphia	United States	The Spectrum
September 24, 1993	Charlotte	United States	Charlotte Coliseum
September 25, 1993	Raleigh	United States	Walnut Creek Amphitheatre
September 28, 1993	Roanoke	United States	Roanoke Civic Center
September 29, 1993	Hampton	United States	Hampton Coliseum
October 1, 1993	Columbia	United States	Carolina Coliseum
October 2, 1993	Atlanta	United States	Coca-Cola Lakewood Amphitheatre
Europe
October 21, 1993	Sheffield	England	Sheffield Arena
October 23, 1993	Solihull	England	National Exhibition Centre
October 24, 1993	Solihull	England	National Exhibition Centre
October 27, 1993	Dublin	Ireland	Point Theatre
October 29, 1993	Glasgow	Scotland	Scottish Exhibition and Conference Centre
October 31, 1993	Brussels	Belgium	Forest National
November 1, 1993	Rotterdam	Netherlands	Rotterdam Ahoy
November 4, 1993	Barcelona	Spain	Palau dels Esports de Barcelona
November 6, 1993	San Sebastián	Spain	Velodromo de Anoeta
November 8, 1993	Paris	France	Palais Omnisports de Paris-Bercy
November 10, 1993	Nuremberg	Germany	Frankenhalle
November 11, 1993	Berlin	Germany	Deutschlandhalle
November 13, 1993	Budapest	Hungary	Budapest Sportcsarnok
November 14, 1993	Vienna	Austria	Wiener Stadthalle
November 15, 1993	Munich	Germany	Olympiahalle
November 17, 1993	Zürich	Switzerland	Hallenstadion
November 18, 1993	Milan	Italy	Palatrussardi
November 20, 1993	Metz	France	Galaxie Amnéville
November 22, 1993	Stuttgart	Germany	Hanns-Martin-Schleyer-Halle
November 23, 1993	Dortmund	Germany	Westfalenhallen
November 25, 1993	Frankfurt	Germany	Festhalle Frankfurt
November 26, 1993	Oldenburg	Germany	Weser-Ems Halle
November 28, 1993	Malmö	Sweden	Malmö Isstadion
November 29, 1993	Oslo	Norway	Oslo Spektrum
December 1, 1993	Helsinki	Finland	Helsinki Ice Hall
December 3, 1993	Stockholm	Sweden	Stockholm Globe Arena
December 4, 1993	Gothenburg	Sweden	Scandinavium
December 7, 1993	London	England	Wembley Arena
December 8, 1993	London	England	Wembley Arena
North America / South America
December 28, 1993	Halifax	Canada	Halifax Metro Centre
December 29, 1993	Saint John	Canada	Harbour Station
December 31, 1993	Boston	United States	Boston Garden
January 1, 1994	Boston	United States	Boston Garden
January 5, 1994	Binghamton	United States	Broome County Veterans Memorial Arena
January 7, 1994	Hershey	United States	Hersheypark Arena
January 14, 1994	São Paulo	Brazil	Estádio do Morumbi
January 17, 1994	Buenos Aires	Argentina	José Amalfitani Stadium
January 21, 1994	Rio de Janeiro	Brazil	Praça da Apoteose
January 23, 1994	Caracas	Venezuela	Poliedro de Caracas
January 25, 1994	Mexico City	Mexico	Palacio de los Deportes
January 26, 1994	Mexico City	Mexico	Palacio de los Deportes
January 28, 1994	Bayamón	Puerto Rico	Juan Ramón Loubriel Stadium
February 1, 1994	Orlando	United States	Orlando Arena
February 2, 1994	Miami	United States	Miami Arena
February 4, 1994	Tampa	United States	USF Sun Dome
February 5, 1994	Tampa	United States	USF Sun Dome
February 9, 1994	New Orleans	United States	Lakefront Arena
February 10, 1994	Pensacola	United States	Pensacola Civic Center
February 12, 1994	Jacksonville	United States	Jacksonville Coliseum
February 14, 1994	Knoxville	United States	Thompson–Boling Arena
February 15, 1994	Charleston	United States	Charleston Civic Center
February 17, 1994	New York City	United States	Madison Square Garden
February 19, 1994	Rochester	United States	Rochester Community War Memorial
February 20, 1994	Pittsburgh	United States	Civic Arena
February 21, 1994	Boston	United States	Hard Rock Cafe
February 22, 1994	Moline	United States	MARK of the Quad Cities
February 23, 1994	Ames	United States	Hilton Coliseum
February 25, 1994	Toledo	United States	Toledo Sports Arena
February 26, 1994	Lexington	United States	Rupp Arena
Japan
April 27, 1994	Yokohama	Japan	Yokohama Arena
April 29, 1994	Osaka	Japan	Osaka-jō Hall
April 30, 1994	Osaka	Japan	Osaka-jō Hall
May 3, 1994	Hiroshima	Japan	Sun-Plaza Hall
May 4, 1994	Fukuoka	Japan	Kokusai Koryo Center
May 6, 1994	Nagoya	Japan	Nagoya Rainbow Hall
May 7, 1994	Tokyo	Japan	Nippon Budokan
May 9, 1994	Tokyo	Japan	Nippon Budokan
May 10, 1994	Tokyo	Japan	Nippon Budokan
May 12, 1994	Tokyo	Japan	Nippon Budokan
May 13, 1994	Tokyo	Japan	Nippon Budokan
May 16, 1994	Tokyo	Japan	Nippon Budokan
May 17, 1994	Tokyo	Japan	Nippon Budokan
Europe
May 21, 1994	Nürburg	Germany	Rock am Ring
May 22, 1994	Munich	Germany	Rock in Riem
May 24, 1994	Graz	Austria	Schwarzl Freizeit Zentrum
May 25, 1994	Budapest	Hungary	Hidegkuti Nándor Stadium
May 27, 1994	Prague	Czech Republic	Stadion Evžena Rošického
May 29, 1994	Warsaw	Poland	Gwardia Stadium
May 30, 1994	Ostrava	Czech Republic	Sportovní hala
June 1, 1994	Halle an der Saale	Germany	Gerry Weber Stadion
June 4, 1994	Castle Donington	England	Monsters of Rock
June 6, 1994	Paris	France	Palais Omnisports de Paris-Bercy
June 7, 1994	Toulouse	France	Palais des Sports
June 9, 1994	Madrid	Spain	Palacio de Deportes de la Comunidad de Madrid
June 9, 1994	Madrid	Spain	Estudio Cadena 40 Principale Studios
June 10, 1994	Zaragoza	Spain	Plaza de Toros de Zaragoza
June 12, 1994	Cascais	Portugal	Praça de Touros de Cascais
June 14, 1994	Bucharest	Romania	Stadionul Național
June 16, 1994	Istanbul	Turkey	İnönü Stadium
June 20, 1994	Saint Petersburg	Russia	White Nights Festival
June 22, 1994	Nijmegen	Netherlands	Mega Music Rock Experience
June 23, 1994	Bielefeld	Germany	Seidenstickerhalle
June 25, 1994	Dijon	France	Parc des Expositions
June 27, 1994	Kiel	Germany	Ostseehalle
June 29, 1994	Stockholm	Sweden	Vasamuseet
June 30, 1994	Roskilde	Denmark	Roskilde Festival
July 2, 1994	Thorout	Belgium	Thorout Rock Festival
July 3, 1994	Werchter	Belgium	Rock Werchter
July 6, 1994	Wels	Austria	Wels Rock Festival
July 7, 1994	Milan	Italy	Sonoria Festival
July 9, 1994	Winterthur	Switzerland	Out in the Green Festival
July 10, 1994	Turku	Finland	Turku Ruisrock Festival
July 12, 1994	Tel Aviv	Israel	Yarkon Park
North America
July 29, 1994	Montreal	Canada	The Forum
July 30, 1994	Montreal	Canada	The Forum
August 1, 1994	Stowe	United States	Stowe Mountain Performing Arts Center
August 3, 1994	Richfield	United States	Richfield Coliseum
August 5, 1994	Milwaukee	United States	Marcus Amphitheatre
August 6, 1994	Tinley Park	United States	World Music Theatre
August 8, 1994	Syracuse	United States	War Memorial Auditorium
August 10, 1994	Hershey	United States	Hersheypark Stadium
August 11, 1994	New Haven	United States	Veterans Memorial Coliseum
August 13, 1994	Saugerties	United States	Woodstock '94
August 15, 1994	Scranton	United States	Montage Mountain P.A.C.
August 17, 1994	Philadelphia	United States	The Spectrum
August 19, 1994	Mansfield	United States	Great Woods
August 20, 1994	Mansfield	United States	Great Woods
August 22, 1994	Old Orchard Beach	United States	Seashore Performing Arts Center
August 24, 1994	Ottawa	Canada	Landsdowne Park
August 26, 1994	Landover	United States	USAir Arena
August 27, 1994	Burgettstown	United States	Starlake Amphitheater
August 29, 1994	Wantagh	United States	Jones Beach Theatre
August 30, 1994	Wantagh	United States	Jones Beach Theatre
September 2, 1994	Atlanta	United States	Lakewood Amphitheatre
September 3, 1994	Antioch	United States	Starwood Amphitheater
September 6, 1994	Antioch	United States	Starwood Amphitheater
September 16, 1994	Raleigh	United States	Hardee's Walnut Creek Amphitheater
September 17, 1994	Charlotte	United States	Blockbuster Pavilion
September 19, 1994	Richmond	United States	Classic Amphitheatre at Strawberry Hill
September 21, 1994	Columbus	United States	Polaris Amphitheater
September 23, 1994	Noblesville	United States	Deer Creek Music Center
September 24, 1994	Auburn Hills	United States	The Palace of Auburn Hills
September 26, 1994	Maryland Heights	United States	Riverport Amphitheater
September 28, 1994	Bonner Springs	United States	Sandstone Amphitheater
September 30, 1994	Houston	United States	The Summit
October 1, 1994	Austin	United States	Southpark Meadows
October 3, 1994	Dallas	United States	Starplex Amphitheater
October 5, 1994	Denver	United States	McNichols Sports Arena
October 7, 1994	Sacramento	United States	California Exposition Amphitheater
October 8, 1994	Mountain View	United States	Shoreline Amphitheatre
October 10, 1994	Reno	United States	Lawlor Events Center
October 12, 1994	Paradise	United States	Thomas & Mack Arena
October 14, 1994	Phoenix	United States	Desert Sky Pavilion
October 15, 1994	Devore	United States	Blockbuster Pavilion
October 17, 1994	Mountain View	United States	Shoreline Amphitheater
October 22, 1994	Portland	United States	Memorial Coliseum
October 24, 1994	Vancouver	Canada	Pacific Coliseum
October 25, 1994	Tacoma	United States	Tacoma Dome
Latin America
November 10, 1994	San Jose	Costa Rica	National Stadium
November 13, 1994	Santiago	Chile	Velodromo del Estadio Nacional
November 16, 1994	Córdoba	Argentina	Estadio Olímpico Chateau Carreras
November 18, 1994	Buenos Aires	Argentina	José Amalfitani Stadium
November 20, 1994	Bogotá	Colombia	Estadio El Campin
North America
December 1, 1994	Cleveland	United States	Gund Arena
December 3, 1994	Louisville	United States	Freedom Hall
December 4, 1994	Auburn Hills	United States	The Palace of Auburn Hills
December 6, 1994	Chicago	United States	United Center
December 8, 1994	Minneapolis	United States	Target Center
December 10, 1994	Philadelphia	United States	CoreStates Spectrum
December 12, 1994	Buffalo	United States	Memorial Auditorium
December 13, 1994	Toronto	Canada	SkyDome
December 15, 1994	Worcester	United States	The Centrum
December 16, 1994	East Rutherford	United States	Brendan Byrne Arena
December 18, 1994	Albany	United States	Knickerbocker Arena
December 19, 1994	Boston	United States	Mama Kin's Music Hall
