= Devil's Got a New Disguise: The Very Best of Aerosmith =

Greatest hits album by Aerosmith
- Released: October 17, 2006
- Recorded: 1972–2006
- Genre: Hard rock, blues rock
- Length: 79:22
- Label: Columbia/Sony Music
- Producer: Steven Tyler; Joe Perry; Jack Douglas; Marti Frederiksen; Adrian Barber; Bruce Fairbairn; Mark Hudson; Kevin Shirley

Aerosmith compilation chronology
O, Yeah! Ultimate Aerosmith Hits (2002)	Devil's Got a New Disguise: The Very Best of Aerosmith (2006)	Tough Love: Best of the Ballads (2011)

Singles from Devil's Got a New Disguise: The Very Best of Aerosmith
- 1. "Devil's Got a New Disguise" Released: October 2006 (promo only)

The Very Best of Aerosmith
- Special Tour Edition

Professional ratings
Review scores
Source	Rating
AllMusic	4/5 stars
Classic Rock	7/10 stars
Entertainment Weekly	C
NeuFutur	6.7/10

Devil's Got a New Disguise: The Very Best of Aerosmith (known in the UK as The Very Best of Aerosmith) is a compilation album by American hard rock band Aerosmith released on October 17, 2006. It has sold more than 265,048 copies in the U.S. as of May 2008.

The album was intended to fulfill Aerosmith's contract with Sony Music/Columbia Records until a release of a new studio album, the first since 2001's Just Push Play but ultimately did not surface. However the long-awaited new album, Music from Another Dimension!, was finally released in November 2012.

Aerosmith had hoped to spend much of 2006 recording material for a new album, but the band had been hit with a number of setbacks during the year, including lead singer Steven Tyler requiring throat surgery in March 2006, bassist Tom Hamilton recovering from treatment for throat cancer, and conflict with their record company. Thus, as the band had been robbed of adequate time to create a quality album, they opted to release a best-of compilation instead.

The album features 18 Aerosmith hits in their single-remix versions, spanning their entire career, as well as two new songs: the title track, "Devil's Got a New Disguise", and "Sedona Sunrise." "Devil's Got a New Disguise" was culled from outtakes from the Pump sessions, during which it was called "Susie Q" and had unfinished lyrics; later, during 1992's Get a Grip sessions, its title changed to "Devil's Got a New Disguise", it was co-written by Diane Warren and for the 2006 version few lines of the lyrics were changed. "Sedona Sunrise" was also culled from the Pump sessions co-written by Jim Vallance (The Other Side, Young Lust, etc.). "Devil's Got A New Disguise" is a straightforward rocker, while "Sedona Sunrise" is a very laidback, somewhat romantic blues-rock tune.

The European edition of the album was released on 30 October 2006 and it features 5 tracks different from the American version. These tracks are: "Amazing", "Angel", "Falling In Love (Is Hard on the Knees)", "Pink", and "The Other Side". The tracks that were on the American edition of the album but are not on the European edition of the album are: "Back in the Saddle", "Last Child", "Mama Kin", "Rag Doll" and "What It Takes".

In North America, the album debuted at number 33 on the Billboard 200, with 23,000 units sold, and had sold 75,000 copies by December 6, 2006.

== American track listing (Devil's Got a New Disguise) ==
1. "Dream On" – from Aerosmith – 4:25
2. "Mama Kin" – from Aerosmith – 4:26
3. "Sweet Emotion" – from Toys in the Attic – 4:34
4. "Back in the Saddle" – from Rocks – 4:39
5. "Last Child" – from Rocks – 3:24
6. "Walk This Way (Run-DMC Version)" (single edit) – from Raising Hell – 3:39
7. "Dude (Looks Like a Lady)" – from Permanent Vacation – 4:20
8. "Rag Doll" – from Permanent Vacation – 4:23
9. "Love in an Elevator" – from Pump – 5:21
10. "Janie's Got a Gun" – from Pump – 5:30
11. "What It Takes" (CHR remix/edit) – from Pump – 4:06
12. "Crazy" (LP edit) – from Get a Grip – 4:02
13. "Livin' on the Edge" (closer to the edge CHR edit) – from Get a Grip – 4:19
14. "Cryin'" – from Get a Grip – 5:07
15. "I Don't Want to Miss a Thing" (pop mix) – from the Armageddon soundtrack – 4:28
16. "Jaded" – from Just Push Play – 3:33
17. "Sedona Sunrise" – 4:16
18. "Devil's Got a New Disguise" – 4:27

== United Kingdom track listing (The Very Best of Aerosmith) ==
1. "Dude (Looks Like a Lady)" – from Permanent Vacation – 4:22
2. "Love in an Elevator" – from Pump – 5:21
3. "Livin' on the Edge" (AOR video edit) – from Get a Grip – 5:06
4. "Walk This Way (Run-DMC Version)" (single edit) – from Raising Hell – 3:41
5. "Cryin'" – from Get a Grip – 5:08
6. "Jaded" – from Just Push Play – 3:35
7. "Crazy" (LP edit) – from Get a Grip – 4:04
8. "Angel" – from Permanent Vacation – 5:05
9. "Janie's Got a Gun" (CHR remix) – from Pump – 4:31
10. "Amazing" – from Get a Grip – 5:56
11. "The Other Side" – from Pump – 4:06
12. "Dream On" – from Aerosmith – 4:26
13. "Sweet Emotion" – Single Edit from Toys in the Attic – 3:15
14. "Falling in Love (Is Hard on the Knees)" – from Nine Lives- 3:25
15. "Pink" – from Nine Lives- 3:54
16. "I Don't Want to Miss a Thing" (pop mix) – from the Armageddon soundtrack – 4:28
17. "Sedona Sunrise" – 4:18
18. "Devil's Got a New Disguise" – 4:27

== Japan track listing ==
1. "Dude (Looks Like a Lady)" – from Permanent Vacation – 4:22
2. "Love in an Elevator" – from Pump – 5:22
3. "Livin' on the Edge" (AOR video edit) – from Get a Grip – 5:06
4. "Walk This Way (Run-DMC Version)" (single edit) – from Raising Hell – 3:45
5. "Cryin'" – from Get a Grip – 5:09
6. "Jaded" – from Just Push Play – 3:35
7. "Crazy" (LP edit) – from Get a Grip – 4:05
8. "Angel" – from Permanent Vacation – 5:06
9. "Amazing" – from Get a Grip – 5:57
10. "The Other Side" – from Pump – 4:07
11. "Dream On" – from Aerosmith – 4:26
12. "Sweet Emotion" – Single Edit from Toys in the Attic – 3:13
13. "Draw the Line" – from Draw the Line – 3:25
14. "Falling in Love (Is Hard on the Knees)" – from Nine Lives - 3:25
15. "Pink" – from Nine Lives - 3:56
16. "I Don't Want to Miss a Thing" – from the Armageddon soundtrack – 4:58
17. "Sedona Sunrise" – 4:18
18. "Devil's Got a New Disguise" – 4:27

== Personnel ==
- Steven Tyler – lead vocals, harmonica, piano
- Tom Hamilton – bass
- Joey Kramer – drums
- Joe Perry – lead and rhythm guitar, backing vocals, pedal steel guitar, talkbox
- Brad Whitford – rhythm and lead guitar, acoustic guitar

== Charts ==
=== Weekly charts ===
Chart (2006–2007)	Peak position
Australian Albums (ARIA)	31
Austrian Albums (Ö3 Austria)	75
Canadian Albums (Nielsen SoundScan)	19
French Compilations	14
Irish Albums (IRMA)	18
Italian Albums (FIMI)	67
Japanese Albums (Oricon)	8
New Zealand Albums (RMNZ)	2
Scottish Albums (OCC)	20
Swiss Albums (Schweizer Hitparade)	30
UK Albums (OCC)	19
UK Rock & Metal Albums (OCC)	1
US Billboard 200	33
US Top Hard Rock Albums (Billboard)	5
US Top Rock Albums (Billboard)	11

=== Year-end charts ===
Chart (2006)	Position
UK Albums (OCC)	102
Chart (2021)	Position
US Top Rock Albums (Billboard)	57
Chart (2022)	Position
US Billboard 200	184
US Top Rock Albums (Billboard)	39

== Certifications ==
Region	Certification	Certified units/sales
Ireland (IRMA)	Platinum	15,000^{^}
Japan (RIAJ)	Platinum	250,000^{^}
New Zealand (RMNZ)	Platinum	15,000^{^}
United Kingdom (BPI)	Platinum	300,000^{^}
^{^} Shipments figures based on certification alone.

== Release history ==
Region	Date	Format	Tracks	Label	Catalog #	Barcode	Edition	Series	Notes
USA	Oct 17, 2006	CD	18	Columbia/SBME	88697 00867 2	886970086721	—	—	
USA	Sep 30, 2008	CD	18	Columbia/SBME	88697 22630 2	886972263021	—	Eco-Friendly Package	
USA	Aug 26, 2011	MP3 256k	18	Columbia/SME	88697 00867 2	886970086721	—	—	10 indiv. tracks, 8 album only
USA	Aug 26, 2011	MP3 320k	18	Columbia/SME	88697 00867 2	886970086721	—	—	10 indiv. tracks, 8 album only
USA	Sep 6, 2011	AAC 256k	18	Columbia/SME	88697 00867 2	886970086721	—	—	10 indiv. tracks, 8 album only
USA	Dec 2014	MP3 320k + AAC 320k	18	Columbia/SME	88697 00867 2	886970086721	—	—	10 indiv. tracks, 8 album only; approx. date; issued between Dec 11 - 17, 2014
USA	Dec 2014	FLAC 44.1/16	18	Columbia/SME	88697 00867 2	886970086721	—	—	10 indiv. tracks, 8 album only; approx. date; issued between Dec 11 - 17, 2014
