= Tough Love: Best of the Ballads =

Greatest hits album by Aerosmith
- Released: May 10, 2011
- Genre: Hard rock, blues rock
- Length: 60:15
- Label: Geffen
- Producer: Various

Aerosmith compilation chronology
Devil's Got a New Disguise: The Very Best of Aerosmith (2006)	Tough Love: Best of the Ballads (2011)	Greatest Hits (2023)

Professional ratings
Review scores
Source	Rating
AllMusic	4/5 stars

Tough Love: Best of the Ballads is a 2011 compilation album by Aerosmith. The album was announced on March 30, 2011, and was released on Geffen Records on May 10, 2011.

== Track listing ==
=== US version ===
No.	Title	Writer(s)	Length
1.	"Angel"	Steven Tyler, Desmond Child	5:06
2.	"Amazing (orchestral edit)"	Tyler, Richie Supa	5:35
3.	"Love in an Elevator (single version)"	Tyler, Joe Perry	5:21
4.	"Cryin'"	Tyler, Perry, Taylor Rhodes	5:08
5.	"What It Takes"	Tyler, Perry, Child	5:11
6.	"Rag Doll"	Tyler, Perry, Jim Vallance, Holly Knight	4:24
7.	"Crazy"	Tyler, Perry, Child	5:16
8.	"Deuces Are Wild"	Tyler, Vallance	3:32
9.	"Livin' on the Edge"	Tyler, Perry, Mark Hudson	6:20
10.	"Blind Man"	Tyler, Perry, Rhodes	3:57
11.	"Janie's Got a Gun (single version)"	Tyler, Tom Hamilton	5:28
12.	"Dream On"	Tyler	4:25

=== UK version ===
No.	Title	Writer(s)	Length
1.	"I Don't Want to Miss a Thing"	Diane Warren	5:00
2.	"Angel"	Tyler, Child	5:08
3.	"Amazing (orchestral edit)"	Tyler, Supa	5:35
4.	"Love in an Elevator (single version)"	Tyler, Perry	5:22
5.	"Pink"	Tyler, Supa, Glen Ballard	3:55
6.	"Cryin'"	Tyler, Perry, Rhodes	5:08
7.	"What It Takes"	Tyler, Perry, Child	5:11
8.	"Rag Doll"	Tyler, Perry, Vallance, Knight	4:25
9.	"Crazy"	Tyler, Perry, Child	5:16
10.	"Deuces Are Wild"	Tyler, Vallance	3:32
11.	"Livin' on the Edge"	Tyler, Perry, Hudson	6:19
12.	"Blind Man"	Tyler, Perry, Rhodes	3:57
13.	"Magic Touch"	Tyler, Perry, Vallance	4:36
14.	"Janie's Got a Gun (single version)"	Tyler, Hamilton	5:28
15.	"Sweet Emotion"	Tyler, Hamilton	4:34
16.	"Dream On"	Tyler	4:28

== Personnel ==
- Steven Tyler - lead vocals, harmonica, piano
- Tom Hamilton - bass
- Joey Kramer - drums
- Joe Perry - lead guitar, backing vocals, pedal steel guitar
- Brad Whitford - rhythm guitar, acoustic guitar

== Release history ==
Region	Date	Format	Tracks	Label	Catalog #	Barcode	Edition	Series	Notes
USA	May 10, 2011	CD	12	Geffen/Universal	B0015499-02	602527669267	—	Target Exclusive	
USA	May 24, 2011	CD	12	Geffen/Universal	B0015499-02	602527669267	—	—	general release
USA	May 15, 2012	CD	12	Geffen/Universal	B0016565-02	602527951102	—	Icon	

== Charts ==
Chart (2011)	Peak position
Scottish Albums (OCC)	39
Swiss Albums (Schweizer Hitparade)	87
UK Albums (OCC)	42
US Billboard 200	109
US Top Hard Rock Albums (Billboard)	8
US Top Rock Albums (Billboard)	29
