= F.I.N.E.* =

Song by Aerosmith

Promotional single by Aerosmith

from the album Pump
- Released: 1989
- Recorded: 1989
- Genre: Hard rock
- Length: 4:09
- Label: Geffen
- Songwriters: Steven Tyler; Joe Perry; Desmond Child
- Producer: Bruce Fairbairn

Aerosmith singles chronology
"Love in an Elevator" (1989)	"F.I.N.E.*" (1989)	"Janie's Got a Gun" (1989)

"F.I.N.E.*" is a song by rock band Aerosmith. It was written by lead singer Steven Tyler and lead guitarist Joe Perry. The song title is an acronym for "Fucked Up, Insecure, Neurotic, and Emotional", as stated in the album's liner notes. The song, totaling four minutes, nine seconds, is the second track on the band's 1989 album Pump. It was released as a promotional single to rock radio in 1989, and reached No. 14 on the Mainstream Rock Tracks chart.

== Song information ==
"F.I.N.E." is an upbeat, hard rock song, similar to "Young Lust" both lyrically and musically. Its raunchy lyrics focus on youth angst and lasciviousness, and the verses feature the line "I'm ready" after each line, suggesting sexual arousal, or being "ready" for sex. Tongue-in-cheek lyrics are prevalent, including "she's got the Cracker Jack, now all I want's the prize", "I got the right key baby, but the wrong keyhole", "I shove my tongue right between your cheeks", etc. The chorus repeats the word "Alright", followed by a person who thinks the narrator is alright, including "your daddy", "your mama", "my old lady", "my little sister", "my brother", "even Tipper" (a reference to Tipper Gore who headed the Parents Music Resource Center censorship campaign during this time), and "Joe Perry" (a reference to Aerosmith's lead guitarist).

The song uses a "loose verse/tight chorus" structure, whereby the verses use a pentatonic melody that sometimes clashes with the chords that make up the harmony, while in the chorus the melody and harmony are more tightly coordinated and the non-chord notes resolve.

The only mentions of the term "F.I.N.E." are in the line "my brand new baby looks so F-I-N-E fine" and in a bridge towards the end of the song, where Tyler sings, "Everything about you is so F-I-N-E fine". Later on the Pump album, in "What It Takes", is the line, "Girl, before I met you I was F-I-N-E fine".

F.I.N.E. was one of the potential titles brainstormed for the album that became Pump, but was blocked by Geffen A&R man John Kalodner. If one looks closely at the trucks on the front cover, the word FINE can be seen on their side.

"F.I.N.E." – "Such a good fuckin' song!" said Tyler – ends with a snippet of the singer doing a variation on a line from "Hangman Jury" from Permanent Vacation.

The song emerged from some jamming between Tyler and Perry. Tyler said that "I sat down at the drums and hit this rhythm that came out of [Perry's] guitar lick. One inspired the other." According to Perry, Kalodner brought Childs in to work on the bridge of a different song that ended up not being used on the album. But the band needed a bridge for F.I.N.E. and the discarded one worked in this song.

Aerosmith biographer Martin Power described the song as Aerosmith's "best moment since Rocks' "Lick and a Promise." He says that it "doesn't so much rock as spontaneously combust" with piled up guitars, broken drumskins and a groove that is uniquely Aerosmith's, while Tyler "rides the musical wave" with his vocal performance. Power describes the final line as a "killer punchline": "I hear that you're so tight you loving squeaks/And I'm ready, so ready."

== Meaning of acronym ==
In the album liner notes, F.I.N.E. is said to stand for "Fucked up, Insecure, Neurotic and Emotional", which Tyler described as being his "constant state". The acronym was popularized by the Aerosmith song for clinical use.

This may have an association to the rehabilitation programs such as A.A. and N.A. Many such programs use this phrase to describe the feeling of your life being out of control.

The acronym is also discussed in the movies The Italian Job (as "Freaked Out, Insecure, Neurotic, Emotional"), Scream 2, and Deadpool 2, as well as in the show Happy Valley (series 1 episode 4).

Liv Tyler also references this as a nod to her father at the end of the movie Super starring Rainn Wilson. During her scene with the rehabilitation group session she is heard stating "fucked up, insecure, neurotic, and emotional".

== In other media ==
The song used to be featured in Walt Disney World's Rock 'n' Roller Coaster Starring Aerosmith in the coaster car with the license plate "BUHBYE" which also features "Young Lust" and a reworked version of "Love in an Elevator" that is re-titled as "Love in a Rollercoaster".

F.I.N.E. was also the name of a hard rock band from Portland, ME.

F.I.N.E. was also used as part of a quote in The Italian Job twice during the movie.

F.I.N.E. was also referenced in the BBC drama Happy Valley by Sgt Catherine Cawood in Season 1 Episode 4.

F.I.N.E. was also referenced in Nancy Drew (2007).
