= Shut Up and Dance (Aerosmith song) =

1994 song by Aerosmith

Single by Aerosmith

from the album Get a Grip
- B-side: "Line Up"
- Released: June 20, 1994
- Genre: Pop metal
- Length: 4:55
- Label: Geffen
- Songwriters: Steven Tyler; Joe Perry; Jack Blades; Tommy Shaw
- Producer: Bruce Fairbairn

Aerosmith singles chronology
"Crazy" (1994)	"Shut Up and Dance" (1994)	"Blind Man" (1994)

"Shut Up and Dance" is a song by American rock band Aerosmith. Written by Steven Tyler, Joe Perry, Jack Blades, and Tommy Shaw, and produced by Bruce Fairbairn, it first appeared on the band's eleventh studio album, Get a Grip (1993). It was released only in the United Kingdom in June 1994 by Geffen Records, reaching number 24 on the UK Singles Chart. It was performed in the 1993 movie Wayne's World 2, starring Mike Myers and Dana Carvey. This live version is included on the movie's soundtrack.

== Lyrical content ==
Some of the lyrics are double entendres, such as "sex is like a gun: you aim, you shoot, you run" and "when you're splittin' hairs with Mr. Clean, it's like gettin' head from a guillotine, and the night has just begun." The chorus is a refrain of "talk is cheap, shut up and dance; don't get deep, shut up and dance."

== Critical reception ==
Andy Gill from The Independent called the song a "simple pop-metal trifle". Alan Jones from Music Week gave it a score of three out of five, writing, "This raucous single's catchy title refrain makes for a great pop radio song. With two previously unreleased tracks, the group's fans will be out there buying it alongside more casual admirers." Gina Morris from Select commented, "'Shut Up and Dance' (Geffen) is a mighty unwholesome, riff-charged metal explosion with a stomping gritty chorus that, yes, in the right trousers, will make you want to dance. At least Steven Tyler can scream in tune, unlike Axl's risible yelp. And they've worked with Run DMC, so they can't be all bad."

== Charts ==
Chart (1994)	Peak position
UK Singles (OCC)	24
