= One More Time (Aerosmith and Yungblud EP) =

- Artwork without sticker

EP by Aerosmith and Yungblud
- Released: November 21, 2025
- Length: 19:39
- Label: Capitol
- Producer: Matt Schwartz

Aerosmith chronology
Greatest Hits (2023)	One More Time (2025)

Yungblud chronology
Idols (2025)	One More Time (2025)	Idols II (2026)

Singles from One More Time
- 1. "My Only Angel" Released: September 15, 2025

One More Time is a collaborative extended play between American rock band Aerosmith and English musician Yungblud, released on November 21, 2025, by Capitol Records.

At the 69th Annual Grammy Awards, the lead single My Only Angel was nominated for Best Rock Song, marking Aerosmith's first nomination at the awards in 24 years.

== Background ==
It's certainly nothing we had planned. We really didn't. It was pretty traumatic, what happened; we've had to cancel gigs before, but this was a big one. This was arguably the biggest tour we had ever mounted, and to have it collapse like that... was heartbreaking. It was almost more than we could get over. After the dust settled and we realized touring wasn't gonna be part of our repertoire, it's also a time where [we realized] there's so many other ways to be creative in this entertainment business.

— Joe Perry on the cancellation of the band's farewell tour and collaborating with Yungblud.

Shortly after the cancellation of Aerosmith's farewell tour, the band decided to collaborate with English musician Yungblud, a collaboration that Joe Perry called "amazing".

== Composition and lyrics ==
"My Only Angel" is a rock track with lyrics focusing on loss of a loved one. "Problems" takes its riff from Boston's hit "More Than a Feeling". Both "Wild Woman" and "A Thousand Days" are country ballads. The EP's final track is a remix of Aerosmith's "Back in the Saddle".

== Release and reception ==
Professional ratings
Review scores
Source	Rating
AllMusic	3/5 stars
Kerrang!	4/5
Louder	4/5 stars
Spectrum Culture	75%
Spill Magazine	4.5/5 stars
XS Noise	2.5/5 stars

Aerosmith and Yungblud both teased the EP on September 12, 2025, via a post to both of their social media accounts of a video of Tyler telling Yungblud "We got a secret, and nobody knows it". One More Time marks Aerosmith's first release of new music since their 2012 album Music from Another Dimension!, which was released on November 6, 2012. It was also the band's first recording outside of Columbia Records in more than three decades.

Writing for British magazine Kerrang!, Rishi Shah wrote there was "nothing overtly surprising about this EP", noting it "serves its purpose, realising this incredible collaboration without dragging it out towards an album of overindulgence", concluding by noting that the EP "feels limited edition, adding another stamp of approval from Boston's finest that rock's present and future belongs to Yungblud."

== Promotion ==
The album's only single "My Only Angel" released on September 15, 2025, appeared on multiple charts, primarily US charts, specifically peaking atop Billboard's Hot Hard Rock Songs chart, a first for the band. A remix of "Wild Woman" with country singer Lainey Wilson was released on December 5, 2025, and was included on the digital reissue of the album.

== Accolades ==
Awards and nominations
Award	Year	Category	Title	Result	Ref.
Grammy Awards	2027	Best Rock Song	My Only Angel	Pending	

== Track listing ==
All tracks are written by Dominic Harrison, Joe Perry, Matt Schwartz, and Steven Tyler, except "Back in the Saddle", written by Perry and Tyler.

Standard edition track listing
No.	Title	Length
1.	"My Only Angel"	4:15
2.	"Problems"	4:22
3.	"Wild Woman"	3:35
4.	"A Thousand Days"	3:57
5.	"Back in the Saddle" (2025 remix; originally included on Rocks)	3:30
Total length:		19:39

Digital reissue bonus track
No.	Title	Length
6.	"Wild Woman" (Lainey Wilson version; with Lainey Wilson)	3:32
Total length:		23:01

== Charts ==
Chart performance
Chart (2025)	Peak position
Austrian Albums (Ö3 Austria)	3
Belgian Albums (Ultratop Flanders)	6
Belgian Albums (Ultratop Wallonia)	26
Canadian Albums (Billboard)	66
Dutch Albums (Album Top 100)	5
French Physical Albums (SNEP)	104
French Rock & Metal Albums (SNEP)	17
German Albums (Offizielle Top 100)	11
German Rock & Metal Albums (Offizielle Top 100)	2
Japanese Albums (Oricon)	32
Japanese Digital Albums (Oricon)	13
Japanese Download Albums (Billboard Japan)	12
Japanese Rock Albums (Oricon)	7
Japanese Top Albums Sales (Billboard Japan)	33
New Zealand Albums (RMNZ)	18
Scottish Albums (Official Charts)	1
Swedish Physical Albums (Sverigetopplistan)	19
Spanish Albums (Promusicae)	71
Swiss Albums (Schweizer Hitparade)	5
UK Albums (Official Charts)	1
UK Rock & Metal Albums (Official Charts)	1
US Billboard 200	9
US Top Rock & Alternative Albums (Billboard)	1
