= Hangman Jury =

1987 single by Aerosmith

Promotional single by Aerosmith

from the album Permanent Vacation
- Released: August 1987
- Recorded: 1987
- Genre: Blues rock
- Length: 5:31
- Label: Geffen
- Songwriters: Steven Tyler; Joe Perry; Jim Vallance
- Producer: Bruce Fairbairn

Aerosmith singles chronology
"My Fist Your Face" (1986)	"Hangman Jury" (1987)	"Dude (Looks Like a Lady)" (1987)

"Hangman Jury" is a song by American rock band Aerosmith. It was released as a promotional single in 1987 on the album Permanent Vacation. It was written by lead singer Steven Tyler, guitarist Joe Perry, and outside collaborator Jim Vallance. In contrast with most of the album which contains highly polished pop metal, "Hangman Jury" is mostly a blues song. The chorus has a close similarity to "Linin' Track" by Lead Belly.

== Background ==
Perry said of writing the song when sober that "when the riff to 'Hangman Jury' came flying off an old funky Silvertone guitar I had found, I was relieved. The music was there. The music was always there. The music for 'Hangman' reflected the rapport I'd always felt for Taj Mahal's deep-rooted blues. I knew we were off to a good start. I kept telling myself that, as a sober kid, I had loved music. The excitement and drive were built in, not supplied by a bottle or a drug."

Perry claimed that the praise for this song was his biggest surprise of the Permanent Vacation album. He received praise for the song from everyone from his 14-year-old son to hip hop record producer Rick Rubin. Rubin said, "I like this one, and I like that one, but you know, I really like 'Hangman Jury.' It's interesting, the spectrum of people who pick up on that."

Perry felt that with the song's "acoustic bottleneck guitar work and spooky country-blues overtones" it is "a perfect example of Aerosmith seeing 'how gritty we can make it'".

According to Aerosmith biographer Martin Power, Tyler got the idea for the song from a record by Taj Mahal, who got the phrase "if I surely could" which most interested Tyler from Lead Belly, who got it from a chant that had been sung by slaves on southern US cotton fields. Aerosmith received permission from Taj Mahal to adapt his song, but Lead Belly's estate sued the band for copyright infringement.

Power describes "Hangman Jury" as "a remarkably powerful song detailing the murder of a wife at the hands of her husband, his dark reasoning for the deed and the terrible consequences to be faced", also saying that it is an example of Aerosmith trying and succeeding to do something different. He describes Tyler's vocal performance as "insightful and chilling" and Perry's guitar playing as "invoking the ghost of Robert Johnson". Power also notes that performances of "Hangman Jury" were a highlight of the Permanent Vacation tour. Richard Bienstock describes the song as being similar to some Led Zeppelin songs, particularly in its arrangement and Tyler's vocal performance and harmonica playing.

== Critical reception ==
Rocky Mount Telegram critic Deborah Saine interprets the song as a warning against using cocaine. Saine regards "Hangman Jury" as being possibly the most creative song on Permanent Vacation. Allmusic critic John Franck described it as an "excellent hobo-harmonica fable."

== Charts ==
Chart (1987)	Peak Position
Mainstream Rock Songs	14
