= Home Tonight =

Song by Aerosmith

Single by Aerosmith

from the album Rocks
- B-side: "Pandora's Box"
- Released: August 27, 1976
- Recorded: 1976
- Genre: Hard rock
- Length: 3:15
- Label: Columbia
- Songwriter: Steven Tyler
- Producer: Jack Douglas

Aerosmith singles chronology
| "Last Child" (1976) | "Home Tonight" (1976) | "Walk This Way" (1976) |

"Home Tonight" is a power ballad by American hard rock band Aerosmith. Written by lead singer Steven Tyler, the song is the closing track on Aerosmith's 1976 album Rocks. It was released as the second single from Rocks and reached number 71 on the Billboard Hot 100.

Cash Box said that "the soft, almost ballad-like vocal holds a lot of appeal, and the harsher rock 'n' roll bridge seems to fit just right."

== Background and release ==
"Home Tonight" was solely written by lead singer Steven Tyler and produced by Aerosmith and Jack Douglas, American record producer.

"Home Tonight" was released as the second single from Rocks on August 27, 1976, with "Pandora's Box" (a song from their 1974 album Get Your Wings) serving as its B-side. The band hoped that the single would impact the charts similarly to their 1973 song "Dream On". However, "Home Tonight" only reached number 71 on the Billboard Hot 100 in 1976.

Record World said the song "contains a raw heavy metal edge but at the same time conveys a gentleness for pop play."

== Live performances ==
In later concerts, Tyler would occasionally perform a segment of "Home Tonight" as an in-concert intro into "Dream On". This is to underscore the relationship between the two songs.

== In other media ==
"Home Tonight" is one of the two theme songs performed by Aerosmith used in the video game Dead or Alive 3 for the Xbox created by Team Ninja. It is played during the extended/full ending credits.

== Legacy ==
On VH1's That Metal Show with Eddie Trunk, the panel declared it number one on their Top 5 Greatest Power Ballads of all Time.

== Charts ==
| Chart (1976) | Peak position |
|---|---|
| Canada Top Singles (RPM) | 82 |
| US Billboard Hot 100 | 71 |
