= Last Child =

Song by Aerosmith

Single by Aerosmith

from the album Rocks
- B-side: "Combination"
- Released: May 27, 1976
- Recorded: 1976
- Genre: Funk rock
- Length: 3:27
- Label: Columbia
- Songwriters: Steven Tyler; Brad Whitford
- Producer: Jack Douglas

Aerosmith singles chronology
"Dream On" (1976)	"Last Child" (1976)	"Home Tonight" (1976)

"Last Child" is a song by American rock band Aerosmith. It was written by Steven Tyler and Brad Whitford and released as the first single from the album Rocks in 1976. It peaked at number 21 on the Billboard Hot 100, one of a string of hits for the band in the mid-1970s.

== Structure ==
The song is one of Brad Whitford's best-known contributions to the band. "Brad wrote, 'Take me back to sweet Tallahassee, home sweet home…'" recalled Tyler. "Whatever he put into 'Last Child', that's his moment. He can take that, and that's his, forever."

== Reception ==
Cash Box said that "it's right in the groove: a straightforward rock tune with a slick, rhythm oriented arrangement."

== Legacy ==
Long after its release, "Last Child" enjoys regular airplay on rock radio and is regularly rotated into Aerosmith's concert setlist. In concert, it is often Whitford's feature spot, in which Tyler introduces him with something like "Brad Whitford, what do you got to show for yourself?" or "What do you got up your sleeve?" Whitford often does a little bit of an intro before playing the opening notes to the song.

Although it was often assumed that the guitar solo as heard on the studio recording was played by Joe Perry, it was originally rumored to have been played by an uncited (hired) guitarist. During his appearance as a guest on That Metal Show in 2012, Whitford stated that he actually wrote and performed the solo himself.

Aerosmith has a history of using guitarists that are not openly credited on the credit section of their albums. The most notable instance being on their 1974 album Get Your Wings. The 6th track on the album titled Train Kept a Rollin', a cover of the 1951 version by blues artist Tiny Bradshaw, has a deep guitar solo towards the middle of the song that adds originality of their rendition. While it was originally assumed to be played by lead guitarist Joe Perry, it has since been uncovered that outside session guitarist Steve Hunter came in to do a majority of the solo work.

"Last Child" has been rereleased on compilations including Aerosmith's Greatest Hits, O, Yeah! Ultimate Aerosmith Hits, and Devil's Got a New Disguise as well as live collections including Live! Bootleg, Classics Live II, and A Little South of Sanity.

== Charts ==
Chart (1976)	Peak position
Canada Top Singles (RPM)	26
US Billboard Hot 100	21
