= Permanent Vacation (Aerosmith album) =

Studio album by Aerosmith
- Released: August 25, 1987
- Recorded: March–May 1987
- Studios: Little Mountain Sound, Vancouver; Unique Recording, New York City
- Genres: Pop metal; hard rock
- Length: 51:46
- Label: Geffen
- Producer: Bruce Fairbairn

Aerosmith chronology
Done with Mirrors (1985)	Permanent Vacation (1987)	Pump (1989)

Singles from Permanent Vacation
- 1. "Dude (Looks Like a Lady)" Released: September 22, 1987; 2. "Angel" Released: January 5, 1988; 3. "Rag Doll" Released: May 3, 1988

Permanent Vacation is the ninth studio album by American rock band Aerosmith, released by Geffen Records on August 25, 1987. The album marks the band's shift to a pop-metal sound that they would maintain up to 1993's Get a Grip.

Production recruited songwriters outside the band, who had written commercial hits for Bon Jovi, Heart and Starship. This came at the suggestion of executive John Kalodner. He also pushed the band to work with producer Bruce Fairbairn, who remained with them for another two albums. It was also the first Aerosmith album to be promoted by heavy music video airplay on MTV. Though Done with Mirrors was intended to mark Aerosmith's comeback, Permanent Vacation is often considered their true comeback, as it was the band's first truly popular album since their reunion. "Rag Doll", "Dude (Looks Like a Lady)", and "Angel" became major hits (all three charted in the Top 20) and helped Permanent Vacation become the band's biggest success in a decade.

Permanent Vacation has sold over five million copies in the U.S. In the UK, it was the first Aerosmith album to attain both Silver (60,000 units sold) and Gold (100,000 units sold) certification by the British Phonographic Industry, achieving these in July 1989 and March 1990 respectively.

== Reception ==
Professional ratings
Review scores
Source	Rating
AllMusic	4/5 stars
Christgau's Record Guide	C+
Collector's Guide to Heavy Metal	8/10
The Encyclopedia of Popular Music	3/5 stars
Metal Forces	9.9/10
The Rolling Stone Album Guide	2/5 stars

Contemporary reviews were mixed-to-positive. Deborah Frost of Rolling Stone wrote that Aerosmith had "made one of the dumbest moves of a checkered career. They've tried to make a hit record", recruiting "last year's hitmakers" and changing their usual themes and lyrics "in a desperate attempt to clean up their act for Eighties radio". She concedes that "even though none of the heavier songs ("Dude," "Heart's Done Time," "Girl Keeps Coming Apart") packs the hooks of Aerosmith's finest moments, the band has never sounded better or more charged." Robert Christgau graded the album a C+, saying Aerosmith were "running out of gas again already". On the other hand, Dave Reynolds from Metal Forces magazine called the album "a shit hot album and one I'm gonna play the hell out of".

In a retrospective assessment AllMusic wrote that "despite the mostly stellar songwriting, which makes it a strong effort overall, some of the album's nooks and crannies haven't aged all that well because of Fairbairn's overwrought production, featuring an exaggerated sleekness typical of most mid-'80s pop-metal albums". Martin Popoff defined Permanent Vacation "blatantly commercial" and rated the album "four-fifths brilliant or good, one-fifth middling or bad", citing the song "Angel" as "a career low". Loudwire ranked Permanent Vacation as Aerosmith's 6th best album and wrote that "its lavish '80s production has definitely dated, but 'Permanent Vacation' still ranks among the greatest musical comebacks of all time". Loudwire also placed the album at No. 4 on their 2017 list of the "10 Best Hard Rock Albums of 1987". Loudersound placed the album on their list of the 20 best albums from 1987 and called it a "collection of sublime pop-metal".

== Track listing ==
Permanent Vacation track listing
No.	Title	Writer(s)	Length
1.	"Heart's Done Time"	Joe Perry; Desmond Child	4:42
2.	"Magic Touch"	Steven Tyler; Perry; Jim Vallance	4:40
3.	"Rag Doll"	Tyler; Perry; Vallance; Holly Knight	4:21
4.	"Simoriah"	Tyler; Perry; Vallance	3:22
5.	"Dude (Looks Like a Lady)"	Tyler; Perry; Child	4:23
6.	"St. John"	Tyler	4:12
7.	"Hangman Jury"	Tyler; Perry; Vallance	5:33
8.	"Girl Keeps Coming Apart"	Tyler; Perry	4:12
9.	"Angel"	Tyler; Child	5:10
10.	"Permanent Vacation"	Tyler; Brad Whitford	4:52
11.	"I'm Down" (The Beatles cover)	John Lennon; Paul McCartney	2:20
12.	"The Movie" (instrumental)	Tyler; Perry; Whitford; Tom Hamilton; Joey Kramer	4:00
Total length:			51:47

== Video release ==
A VHS titled Permanent Vacation 3x5 was released in 1988 that is a compilation of promotional videos for "Dude (Looks Like a Lady)", "Angel", and "Rag Doll". It also contained behind-the-scenes footage.

== Personnel ==
Adapted from the album liner notes.

Aerosmith

- Steven Tyler – lead vocals, piano, harmonica
- Joe Perry – guitar, backing vocals
- Brad Whitford – guitar
- Tom Hamilton – bass guitar
- Joey Kramer – drums

Additional musicians

- Drew Arnott – Mellotron on "Angel" and "The Movie"
- Tom Keenlyside – clarinet, tenor saxophone, horn arrangement on "Dude (Looks Like a Lady)" and "Rag Doll"
- Ian Putz – baritone saxophone on "Dude (Looks Like a Lady)" and "Rag Doll"
- Bob Rogers – trombone on "Dude (Looks Like a Lady)" and "Rag Doll"
- Henry Christian – trumpet
- Bruce Fairbairn – trumpet on "Dude (Looks Like a Lady)" and "Rag Doll", cello on "The Movie", production
- Scott Fairbairn – cello on "The Movie"
- Mike Fraser – plunger mute, engineering, mixing
- Morgan Rael – steel drums on "Permanent Vacation"
- Jim Vallance – organ on "Rag Doll" and "Simoriah"
- Christine Arnott – backing vocals on "The Movie"

Production

- Bob Rock – engineering
- Ken Lomas – engineering assistance
- George Marino – mastering
- Kim Champagne – art direction
- Andy Engel – illustrations
- Neal Preston – photography

== Charts ==
Chart performance for Permanent Vacation
Chart (1987–1988)	Peak position
Australian Albums (Kent Music Report)	42
Canada Top Albums/CDs (RPM)	16
Japanese Albums (Oricon)	50
UK Albums (Official Charts)	37
US Billboard 200	11

== Certifications ==
Certifications for Permanent Vacation
Region	Certification	Certified units/sales
Canada (Music Canada)	5× Platinum	500,000^{^}
Japan (RIAJ)	Gold	100,000^{^}
United Kingdom (BPI)	Gold	100,000^{^}
United States (RIAA)	5× Platinum	5,000,000^{^}
^{^} Shipments figures based on certification alone.

== See also ==
- Permanent Vacation Tour
