= Cryin' =

1993 single by Aerosmith

Single by Aerosmith

from the album Get a Grip
- B-side: "Walk On Down"
- Released: June 29, 1993
- Studio: A&M (Hollywood, California); Little Mountain (Vancouver, Canada)
- Genre: Pop metal; blues rock; country
- Length: 5:08 (album version); 4:14 (fade)
- Label: Geffen
- Songwriters: Steven Tyler; Joe Perry; Taylor Rhodes
- Producer: Bruce Fairbairn

Aerosmith singles chronology
"Eat the Rich" (1993)	"Cryin'" (1993)	"Amazing" (1993)

Music video
- "Cryin'" on YouTube

"Cryin'" is a song by American rock band Aerosmith. A power ballad, it was written by Steven Tyler, Joe Perry, and Taylor Rhodes, and released by Geffen Records on June 29, 1993, as the third single (second in the United States) from their 11th studio album, Get a Grip (1993). Tyler described the song by saying, "It was country – we just Aerosmith'd it."

"Cryin'" reached number 12 on the US Billboard Hot 100 and number 11 on the Cash Box Top 100. It is one of their most successful hits in Europe, reaching number one in Norway, number three in Iceland, Portugal, and Sweden, and number 17 on the UK Singles Chart. The song went gold in the US for selling over 500,000 copies. Its music video, directed by Marty Callner, features Alicia Silverstone, Stephen Dorff and Josh Holloway.

== Critical reception ==
Alan Jones from Music Week gave the song three out of five, describing it as "a high-octane performance" and named it the best song from the Get A Grip album. He also declared it as "anthemic and compelling. Expect a brief but glittering chart life." Another Music Week editor, Andy Martin, also gave it three out of five, adding that "it is hard to see the single having any more than a brief but glittering run."

== Music video ==
A screenshot of Alicia Silverstone's character getting a navel piercing in the music video for "Cryin'".

The accompanying music video for "Cryin'", directed by American director Marty Callner, features the first of three successive appearances by Alicia Silverstone in the band's videos, the next two being "Amazing" (1993) and "Crazy" (1994). Silverstone was 16 years old when "Cryin'" was filmed. In the video, the band performs in the Central Congregational Church in Fall River, Massachusetts. The video flashes back and forth between the band and Silverstone, who plays a teen who has a falling out with her boyfriend (played by Stephen Dorff) after catching him cheating. She feigns an attempt to kiss him, but instead leans away, annoying him. She then punches him and shoves him out of the car, leaving him in the dust. She begins a phase of rebellion and individuality and gets a navel piercing, which has largely been credited as introducing navel piercing to mainstream culture. After having her purse stolen by another young man (played by then-unknown Josh Holloway of Lost), she chases him down and knocks him to the ground. The video then cuts to her standing on the edge of an overpass, contemplating jumping. Her now ex-boyfriend arrives on the scene, along with numerous police officers, encouraging her to come down from the bridge. She jumps, but a bungee rope is revealed, arresting her fall and leaving her dangling over the freeway, laughing at Dorff's character. The video ends with the dangling Silverstone looking up and giving Dorff the finger.

The video was a success on MTV, becoming the most requested video in 1993 and earning the band several awards at the Video Music Awards.

== Awards ==
- MTV Video Music Award for Video of the Year, 1994
- MTV Video Music Award for Viewer's Choice, 1994
- MTV Video Music Award for Best Group Video, 1994

== Track listings ==
- US and Canadian 7-inch and cassette single

A. "Cryin'" (LP version) – 5:08
B. "Walk On Down" (LP version) – 3:39

- UK CD single
1. "Cryin'" (LP version) – 5:08
2. "Walk On Down" (LP version) – 3:39
3. "I'm Down" (LP version) – 2:20
4. "My Fist Your Face" (LP version) – 4:21
- European CD single
1. "Cryin'" (LP version) – 5:08
2. "Love in an Elevator" (LP version) – 5:22
3. "Janie's Got a Gun" (LP version) – 5:29
- German 7-inch single

A. "Cryin'" – 5:08
B. "Love in an Elevator" – 5:22

- French CD and cassette single
1. "Cryin'" (LP version) – 5:08
2. "Janie's Got a Gun" (LP version) – 5:29
- Australian CD single
1. "Cryin'"
2. "Janie's Got a Gun"
3. "Love in an Elevator"

== Charts ==
=== Weekly charts ===
Chart (1993–1994)	Peak position
Australia (ARIA)	80
Austria (Ö3 Austria Top 40)	5
Belgium (Ultratop 50 Flanders)	8
Canada Top Singles (RPM)	8
Denmark (IFPI)	6
Europe (Eurochart Hot 100)	7
Europe (European Hit Radio)	30
France (SNEP)	6
Germany (GfK)	7
Iceland (Íslenski Listinn Topp 40)	3
Ireland (IRMA)	20
Netherlands (Dutch Top 40)	7
Netherlands (Single Top 100)	5
Norway (VG-lista)	1
Portugal (AFP)	3
Sweden (Sverigetopplistan)	3
Switzerland (Schweizer Hitparade)	4
UK Singles (Official Charts)	17
US Billboard Hot 100	12
US Mainstream Rock (Billboard)	1
US Pop Airplay (Billboard)	11
US Cash Box Top 100	11

=== Year-end charts ===
Chart (1993)	Position
Canada Top Singles (RPM)	62
Iceland (Íslenski Listinn Topp 40)	65
Netherlands (Dutch Top 40)	59
Netherlands (Single Top 100)	93
Sweden (Topplistan)	21
US Billboard Hot 100	60
US Album Rock Tracks (Billboard)	4

Chart (1994)	Position
Belgium (Ultratop)	92
Europe (Eurochart Hot 100)	42
Germany (Media Control)	78
Sweden (Topplistan)	93
Switzerland (Schweizer Hitparade)	45

== Certifications ==
Region	Certification	Certified units/sales
Germany (BVMI)	Gold	250,000^{^}
New Zealand (RMNZ)	Gold	15,000^{‡}
Norway (IFPI Norway)	Gold	
Spain (Promusicae)	Gold	30,000^{‡}
United Kingdom (BPI)	Silver	200,000^{‡}
United States (RIAA)	Gold	500,000^{^}
^{^} Shipments figures based on certification alone.^{‡} Sales+streaming figures based on certification alone.

== Release history ==
Region	Date	Format(s)	Label(s)	Ref.
United States	June 29, 1993	7-inch vinyl; cassette	Geffen	
Japan	July 21, 1993	CD	Geffen	
Australia	August 16, 1993	CD; cassette	Geffen	
United Kingdom	October 18, 1993	12-inch vinyl; CD; cassette	Geffen	
