= Dude (Looks Like a Lady) =

1987 single by Aerosmith

- 7-inch vinyl variant of standard artwork

Single by Aerosmith

from the album Permanent Vacation
- B-side: "Once is Enough"; "Simoriah"
- Released: September 22, 1987; 1990 (re-issue)
- Recorded: 1987
- Genre: Hard rock; pop metal; glam metal; blues rock
- Length: 4:24 (album version); 5:13 (alternate mix)
- Label: Geffen
- Songwriters: Steven Tyler; Joe Perry; Desmond Child
- Producer: Bruce Fairbairn

Aerosmith singles chronology
"Walk This Way (with Run-DMC)" (1986)	"Dude (Looks Like a Lady)" (1987)	"Angel" (1988)

Music video
- "Dude (Looks Like a Lady)" on YouTube

"Dude (Looks Like a Lady)" is a song by American rock band Aerosmith. It was released as the lead single from the band's ninth studio album Permanent Vacation in 1987. The song was written by lead singer Steven Tyler, lead guitarist Joe Perry and songwriter Desmond Child.

== Origins ==
The song talks about a man who is mistaken for a woman. According to Desmond Child, Steven Tyler came up with the idea after mistaking Mötley Crüe singer Vince Neil for a woman with long blonde hair. Tyler's bandmates made fun of him, joking about how the "dude looked like a lady". In his book The Heroin Diaries, Mötley Crüe's Nikki Sixx concurs that the song was inspired by Neil.

"We were hailing a taxi in New York one night and these fucks, Mötley Crüe, pulled up in a limo. They called us in and every other word out of their mouths was 'dude'. You know, 'Yo dude! Your dude is really dude, dude.' I hadn't heard this crazy 'dude' shit before. We had just bought a sampler and we were listening to an Eddie Murphy album – the one where he keeps going on about Mr. T being gay… I kind of got a lick, but couldn't get the words. I had shit like, 'Cruisin' for the ladies,' or, 'My old lady's got rabies.' Bad stuff. Then I remembered my new word, 'dude'." – Steven Tyler

Of "Cruisin' for the Ladies", Child said, "I don't think Van Halen would put that on the B-side of their worst record." Child recalls developing the song with the group:

I walked in, and they had a song already written as "Cruisin' for the Ladies." They looked at me like, "Get outta here." Then Steven said, "Well, originally, when I was writing the song, I was singing 'Dude looks like a lady'." I said, "Oh my God, that's a smash." At first I suggested, "Let's write a story song. Maybe it's a guy who was like a Vietnam vet who was so like traumatized, he came back and became a drag queen." Joe Perry got a very stern look on his face and said, "Some of my friends are vets." I said, "OK. Forget about that idea. What about a guy who goes into a strip joint and sees this gorgeous, you know, bosomed blond stripping on stage and then he goes backstage and finds out it's really a guy." And they went with that. It goes, "She's a funky lady, I like it, like it, like it like that." The singer's sort of implying he went for it anyway 'cause he liked what he saw. He goes, "Never judge a book by its cover/or who you're gonna love by your lover." It has a kind of deep message in a way, because it's like, well, what is love, and what is a person, and if you're attracted to what you're seeing, you're attracted to it, you know? It's a kind of elevated song about androgyny, and, in spite of the fact that it's down and dirty, it has a kind of lofty concept.

Joe Perry — who came up with the chorus riff – was concerned that the subject matter would offend the gay community, but Child said, "I'm gay, and I'm not insulted. Let's write this song."

In 2012, Child described the song as being about "a tranny". He said, "I talked Aerosmith into the whole scenario of a guy that walks into a strip joint and falls in love with the stripper on stage, goes backstage and finds out it's a guy." In 2019, Child confirmed that the song was about a man who "just walks into a bar and sees this gorgeous blonde up on the stage and then goes backstage after the show and then she 'whips out a gun, tries to blow me away.'"

== Release and reception ==
The track reached number 14 on the Billboard Hot 100, number 41 on the Hot Dance Club Play chart, number four on the Mainstream Rock Tracks chart, number 22 on the Canadian RPM Top Singles chart and number 45 on the UK Singles Chart. It was re-released in early 1990 and peaked at number 20 in the UK. It was certified gold in the UK for sales and streams exceeding over 400,000 units.

Cash Box said that it has "humorous lyrics coupled with a driving rock beat."

"Dude (Looks Like a Lady)" received the band's first two MTV Video Music Award nominations in 1988, for Best Group Video and Best Stage Performance, but did not win.

=== Controversy ===
Some have criticized "Dude (Looks Like a Lady)" as transphobic due to "the lyrics and music video’s offensive insinuations about trans women.

In August 2013, Fox News was criticized after playing the song while introducing Chelsea Manning. The network additionally used Manning's deadname, and masculine pronouns. Caitlyn Jenner received criticism after she called "Dude (Looks Like a Lady)" her "theme song" in 2017.

== Music video ==
The video for "Dude (Looks Like a Lady)" features the band performing live onstage as well as random moments of characters portraying drag queens, including a cameo appearance by music industry executive John Kalodner in a wedding dress. This is a joke based on the fact that Kalodner always dresses in white. Joe Perry's wife Billie also appears, dancing with a saxophone.

There are also some provocative sexual performances, both led by singer Steven Tyler as well as a performer who has her skirt removed to reveal the Aerosmith "wings" tattoo on her buttock. The video was directed by Marty Callner. It was played in heavy rotation on MTV.

== Legacy ==
The song has long been a staple on both rock radio and in concert, as the band has regularly rotated it into their set lists over the years.

The song has been featured on a number of subsequent compilation albums by Aerosmith including 1994's Big Ones, 2002's O, Yeah! Ultimate Aerosmith Hits, 2006's Devil's Got a New Disguise: The Very Best of Aerosmith, and the 1998 live album A Little South of Sanity.

Concurrent with its chart run, the song was played in the 1987 comedy film Like Father Like Son, starring Kirk Cameron and Dudley Moore. Steven Tyler referenced the song when being interviewed in the 1988 documentary The Decline of Western Civilization Part II: The Metal Years, which focused on the L.A. glam metal scene and had discussions on how these bands experimented with feminine looks to attract women.

Professional wrestler Roddy Piper appeared as a guest VJ on MTV shortly after the song's release. During one segment, the song's video was played, followed by a Michael Jackson video. Piper appeared afterward, repeatedly chanting "Dude looks like a lady!" in the manic fashion of a wrestling interview, intended more as a jab at Jackson than any reference to Aerosmith or the song.

In 1993, the song was prominently featured in the family comedy film Mrs. Doubtfire, during a montage of the main character (Robin Williams) bonding with his family in disguise as a woman. The song was also used in the film's TV ads. Randi Mayem Singer, the writer of Mrs. Doubtfire, credits "Dude (Looks Like a Lady)" as one of the most important songs ever written and as the direct influence for writing the script. She was quoted as saying "Without ['Dude (Looks Like a Lady)'], there would be no Mrs. Doubtfire".

The song was also featured in the movie It's Pat where the title character (played by Julia Sweeney) sings a karaoke version at their wedding reception. The song fits in with the running joke throughout the film, in reference to Pat's gender ambiguity.

The song was performed live by the band in the movie Wayne's World 2, and is featured on the soundtrack for the film.

In "There's Something About Marrying", the tenth episode of the sixteenth season of the American animated television series The Simpsons, Veronica is singing the song while shaving as Marge accidentally discovers him as a man cross-dressed as a woman who is about to marry her sister Patty.

The video for "Dude (Looks Like a Lady)" is featured on the karaoke game SingStar Vol. 2 for PlayStation 3.

Colombian singer Shakira sang the song with Steven Tyler on MTV Icon and also included it on the set list of her Tour of the Mongoose.

The song used to play as one of the possible song choices on Rock 'n' Roller Coaster at Disney's Hollywood Studios.

The song is featured in the MTV animated series Station Zero where DJ Tech played on his turntables.

== Credits and personnel ==
- Steven Tyler – lead vocals
- Joe Perry – lead guitar, backing vocals
- Brad Whitford – rhythm guitar
- Tom Hamilton – bass guitar
- Joey Kramer – drums

=== Additional personnel ===
- Tom Keenlyside – clarinet, tenor saxophone, horn arrangement
- Ian Putz – baritone saxophone
- Bob Rogers – trombone
- Henry Christian – trumpet
- Bruce Fairbairn – trumpet, background vocals

== Charts ==
Chart (1987–1988)	Peak position
Canada Top Singles (RPM)	22
UK Singles (Official Charts)	45
US Billboard Hot 100	14
US Dance Club Songs (Billboard)	41
US Mainstream Rock Airplay (Billboard)	4

Chart (1990)	Peak position
UK Singles (Official Charts)	20

== Certifications ==
Region	Certification	Certified units/sales
New Zealand (RMNZ)	Gold	15,000^{‡}
United Kingdom (BPI)	Gold	400,000^{‡}
^{‡} Sales+streaming figures based on certification alone.
