= Angel (Aerosmith song) =

1988 single by Aerosmith

Single by Aerosmith

from the album Permanent Vacation
- B-side: "Girl Keeps Coming Apart"
- Released: January 5, 1988
- Recorded: 1987
- Genre: Glam metal
- Length: 5:08 (album version); 3:56 (radio edit); 4:02 (from Greatest Hits 2023)
- Label: Geffen
- Songwriters: Steven Tyler; Desmond Child
- Producer: Bruce Fairbairn

Aerosmith singles chronology
"Dude (Looks Like a Lady)" (1987)	"Angel" (1988)	"Rag Doll" (1988)

Music video
- "Angel" on YouTube

"Angel" is a power ballad by American rock band Aerosmith. It was written by lead singer Steven Tyler and professional songwriting collaborator Desmond Child.

It was released in 1988 as the third single from the band's 1987 album, Permanent Vacation. It quickly climbed to No. 3 on the Billboard Hot 100 in late April 1988, which at the time was their highest-charting single ever. The song currently ranks second behind their 1998 smash "I Don't Want to Miss a Thing", which was Aerosmith's first (and, as of 2026, only) single to top the Hot 100.

== Reception ==
Cash Box called it a "searing rock ballad" on which "Steven Tyler recreates the emotional intensity of the classic 'Dream On.'"

== Song structure ==
The song is in E♭ major.

== Personnel ==
- Steven Tyler – lead vocals, piano
- Joe Perry – lead guitar, backing vocals
- Brad Whitford – rhythm guitar
- Tom Hamilton – bass guitar
- Joey Kramer – drums

Additional musicians

- Drew Arnott – mellotron

== Charts ==
=== Weekly charts ===
Chart (1988)	Peak position
Canada Top Singles (RPM)	14
UK Singles Chart	69
US Billboard Hot 100	3
US Mainstream Rock (Billboard)	2

=== Year-end chart ===
Chart (1988)	Position
US Billboard Hot 100	34
