= Love in an Elevator =

1989 single by Aerosmith

- Original single artwork by Mark Ryden

Single by Aerosmith

from the album Pump
- B-side: "Young Lust"; "Ain't Enough"
- Released: August 15, 1989
- Studio: Little Mountain Sound (Vancouver, Canada)
- Genre: Glam metal; pop metal; funk metal; blues rock; hard rock
- Length: 5:39 (album version); 3:38 (single version)
- Label: Geffen
- Songwriters: Joe Perry; Steven Tyler
- Producer: Bruce Fairbairn

Aerosmith singles chronology
"Rag Doll" (1988)	"Love in an Elevator" (1989)	"F.I.N.E.*" (1989)

Music video
- "Love In An Elevator" on YouTube

"Love in an Elevator" is a song performed by American rock band Aerosmith, written by Steven Tyler and Joe Perry. It was released in August 1989 as the lead single from their third album with Geffen Records, Pump, released the following month. It peaked at No. 5 on the US Billboard Hot 100 chart and reached No. 1 on the Billboard Album Rock Tracks chart. The Recording Industry Association of America (RIAA) certified the song gold.

== Background ==
According to Steven Tyler, the song was based on an actual experience where he was making out with a woman in an elevator and the doors opened. Tyler said that "It felt like a lifetime waiting for those doors to close."

== Recording ==
"Love in an Elevator", like the other tracks on Pump, was recorded at Little Mountain Sound Studios in Vancouver. The song was produced by Bruce Fairbairn and was engineered by Mike Fraser with Ken Lomas as second engineer, and in addition to Aerosmith – Steven Tyler (lead vocals), Joe Perry (guitars, backing vocals), Brad Whitford (guitars, backing vocals), Tom Hamilton (bass, backing vocals), and Joey Kramer (drums) – were Bob Dowd (backing vocals), Bruce Fairbairn (backing vocals), and Catherine Epps (elevator operator).

== Music video ==
The music video for "Love in an Elevator" was directed by Marty Callner. At the beginning of the video, Aerosmith are walking through luxury Los Angeles department store Bullocks Wilshire. An elevator operator (played by former Playboy model Brandi Brandt) suggestively asks Tyler if he is "going down". Tyler leaps into the elevator before the band begins playing the song onstage (with several flash cuts to scenes in the department store).

== Reception ==
=== Award nomination ===
The song received a Grammy Award nomination in 1990 for Best Hard Rock Performance, but lost out to Living Colour.

== Track listings ==
7-inch vinyl

Side one
No.	Title	Writer(s)	Length
1.	"Love in an Elevator"	Joe Perry, Steven Tyler

Side two
No.	Title	Writer(s)	Length
1.	"Young Lust"	Tyler, Perry, Jim Vallance

CD single

No.	Title	Writer(s)	Length
1.	"Love in an Elevator" (edit)	Perry, Tyler	3:42
2.	"Ain't Enough"	Perry, Tyler	5:03
3.	"Young Lust" (LP version)	Tyler, Perry, Jim Vallance	4:22

== Charts ==
=== Weekly charts ===
Chart (1989)	Peak position
Australia (ARIA)	33
Belgium (Ultratop 50 Flanders)	28
Canada Top Singles (RPM)	13
Canada Retail Sales (RPM)	6
Italy Airplay (Music & Media)	9
Netherlands (Single Top 100)	14
Netherlands (Dutch Top 40)	9
New Zealand (Recorded Music NZ)	14
UK Singles (Official Charts)	13
US Billboard Hot 100	5
US Mainstream Rock (Billboard)	1

=== Year-end charts ===
Chart (1989)	Position
Netherlands (Dutch Top 40)	99
US Billboard Hot 100	81
US Album Rock Tracks (Billboard)	20

== Certifications ==
Region	Certification	Certified units/sales
United States (RIAA)	Gold	500,000^{^}
^{^} Shipments figures based on certification alone.

== Release history ==
Region	Date	Format(s)	Label(s)	Ref.
United States	August 15, 1989	—N/a	Geffen	
United Kingdom	August 28, 1989	7-inch vinyl; 12-inch vinyl; CD	Geffen	
United Kingdom	September 18, 1989	7-inch vinyl with patch	Geffen	
United Kingdom	October 2, 1989	12-inch picture disc; cassette	Geffen	
