= Rag Doll (Aerosmith song) =

1988 single by Aerosmith

Single by Aerosmith

from the album Permanent Vacation
- B-side: "St. John"; "Rag Doll" (Rockapella mix)
- Released: May 3, 1988
- Genre: Pop metal; glam metal; blues rock
- Length: 4:24
- Label: Geffen
- Songwriters: Steven Tyler; Joe Perry; Jim Vallance; Holly Knight
- Producer: Bruce Fairbairn

Aerosmith singles chronology
| "Angel" (1988) | "Rag Doll" (1988) | "Love in an Elevator" (1989) |

Music video
- "Rag Doll" on YouTube

"Rag Doll" is a song by the American rock band Aerosmith. It is from their 1987 album Permanent Vacation. It was released as the final single from the album in 1988. It was written by Steven Tyler, Joe Perry, Jim Vallance, and Holly Knight. The song "[filters] the essence of Aerosmith's funkiest moments through the boom-thwack beat of the hair-metal '80s".

== Song origin ==
The song's lyrics were primarily written by Tyler and Vallance, Perry originating the guitar riff, and Vallance writing the bass line. The song was originally titled "Rag Time"; however, John Kalodner did not like that, so Holly Knight was called in to help change that lyric. She suggested "Rag Doll", which was actually another title Tyler and Vallance had considered.

== Song structure ==
The song is notable for drummer Joey Kramer's 1-2-1-2 lead beat in the beginning of the song, Joe Perry's slide guitar, and a horn section arranged by Tom Keenlyside. The song is in B minor. The melody and lyrics to the second verse are based on the vocal countermelody of the Rolling Stones' cover of Hank Snow's "I'm Movin' On" that appears on Got Live If You Want It! in which Keith Richards sings "Yes, I'm movin'" in response to Mick Jagger singing "I'm movin' on". The chorus includes the phrase, "Come on up and see me", which is associated with entertainer Mae West. The final reference in particular echoes West's trademark suggestive cadence.

The music on the radio single differed from the album version in having a more urgent, driving beat, fueled by Tom Hamilton's bass, and slightly different sax notes. This version had an earlier fadeout, omitting the classic clarinet and trumpet duet behind Tyler's scat singing. The video is based on the album version of the song.

== Reception ==
Cash Box praised the "rockin', hit single" for having a "spicy drum effect at the very end ." Rolling Stone ranked "Rag Doll" in 12th place on their "The 50 Best Aerosmith Songs" list, calling it a "propulsive fusion of blues rock and hair metal, complete with slide guitar and a horn section."

== Track listing ==
(Including Any Other Editions)

1. Rag Doll (4:24)
2. Rag Doll (Extended Vacation) (6:59)
3. Rag Doll (Rock Mix) (4:23)
4. Rag Doll (Rockappella Mix) (4:07)
5. Rag Doll (Dub Version) (5:33)
6. Rag Doll (Extended Vacation/LP Version) (7:15)
7. Rag Doll (The All Dayparts Edit) (3:05)
8. Rag Doll (Remix) (2:50)
9. Rag Doll (Edit) (3:05)

== Charts ==
Weekly chart performance for "Rag Doll"
| Chart (1987–1990) | Peak position |
|---|---|
| Canada Top Singles (RPM) | 23 |
| Canada Retail Sales (RPM) (Note: Starting September 1988, the RPM Top Singles chart was radio-only, and a new "Retail Sales" chart was introduced. "Rag Doll" peaked at number nine in the second week of its existence, meaning its not a component of its Top Singles peak.) | 9 |
| Ireland (IRMA) | 29 |
| Italy (Musica e dischi) | 12 |
| Netherlands (Dutch Top 40) | 19 |
| Netherlands (Single Top 100) | 16 |
| UK Singles (Official Charts) | 42 |
| US Billboard Hot 100 | 17 |
| US Mainstream Rock (Billboard) | 12 |

== Cover versions ==
- Ted Nugent
- Tony Franklin
- Vinnie Colaiuta
- Derek Sherinian covered the song for the Aerosmith tribute album Not the Same Old Song and Dance (Eagle Records, 1999). Backing vocals were by David Glen Eisley.
- Postmodern Jukebox covered the song on the hot jazz style with Veronica Swift.
