= Pop metal =

Genre of heavy metal music

- Other names: Metal pop
- Stylistic origins: Heavy metal; pop; hard rock; arena rock; pop rock; power pop
- Cultural origins: Late 1970s and early to mid 1980s

Fusion genres
- Glam metal; kawaii metal

Other topics
- Pop rock; power pop; synth-metal; arena rock; alternative metal

Pop metal (sometimes conflated with or used interchangeably with glam metal) is an umbrella term for commercial heavy metal and hard rock styles that feature prominent pop music elements such as catchy hooks and anthemic choruses. It became popular in the 1980s among acts such as Bon Jovi, Europe, Def Leppard, Poison, Mötley Crüe, and Ratt.

The term is also applied to some artists and bands that have formed since the 1990s that mix aspects of pop and heavy metal into their sound.

== Characteristics ==
Pop metal is a variation of heavy metal which emphasizes catchy pop-influenced hooks and guitar riffs. It was influenced by the anthemic choruses of arena rock. While pop metal recordings were often loud, they also featured "slick," radio-friendly production sheen. Bands from the Los Angeles metal scene also borrowed visual elements from 1970s glam rock, leading to the glam metal variation of the late 1980s.

The alternate term "metal pop" was coined by critic Philip Bashe in 1983 to describe bands such as Van Halen and Def Leppard. In the "definitive metal family tree" of his documentary Metal: A Headbanger's Journey, anthropologist Sam Dunn differentiates pop metal, which includes bands like Def Leppard, Europe, and Whitesnake, from glam metal bands that include Mötley Crüe and Poison.

== History ==
The catchy hard rock of Kiss and Van Halen in the 1970s helped spawn the genre, along with acts such as Thin Lizzy and AC/DC. Van Halen's 1978 debut album marked a turning point in the style, making that sound "flashier, more creative, and more energetic than ever before." The first wave of pop metal, which was not as pop-oriented as later developments, included bands such as Mötley Crüe, Quiet Riot, Dokken, Ratt, and Twisted Sister.

More melodic acts such as Def Leppard and Bon Jovi saw further success in the 1980s with albums like Pyromania (1983) and Slippery When Wet (1986), while the hair metal variation became dominant. The genre's popularity was at its peak between 1982 and 1991. The arrival of grunge in 1991 largely turned audiences away from pop metal.

Despite the decline in popularity, the term "pop metal" is also sometimes applied to a number of accessible or melodic metal and heavy rock bands and artists that are usually not associated with glam metal, and have formed since the 1990s. Such acts include Amaranthe, Andrew W.K., Architects, Bring Me the Horizon, Coheed and Cambria, Dead by April, Evanescence, Halestorm, Ghost, In Flames, In This Moment, Lacuna Coil, Poppy, Shinedown, The Pretty Reckless, We Are the Fallen, and Weezer.

Beginning in the mid-2010s, “pop metal” has been mainly used to describe a highly produced, glossy metal subgenre that combines metal or metalcore with pop, R&B, and electronic music and sometimes with elements of djent. Bring Me the Horizon are widely considered to be the progenitors of the genre, namely with the success of their single “Can You Feel My Heart” and subsequent albums. Other bands in this subgenre include Issues, Poppy, Sleep Token, and PRESIDENT. Other metal and metalcore bands have shifted toward pop metal in the 2020s, such as Architects on For Those That Wish to Exist and Spiritbox on Tsunami Sea.
