= Hidden Treasures (EP) =

1995 EP by Megadeth

EP by Megadeth
- Released: July 18, 1995
- Recorded: 1987–94
- Genre: Heavy metal
- Length: 29:16
- Label: Capitol
- Producers: Desmond Child, Max Norman, Dave Mustaine

Megadeth chronology
Youthanasia (1994)	Hidden Treasures (1995)	Cryptic Writings (1997)

Japanese Limited Edition cover

Hidden Treasures is a compilation EP by American thrash metal band Megadeth, released on July 18, 1995, via Capitol Records. The album features songs that originally appeared on film soundtracks and tribute albums. Four of the tracks were released as singles, and three have received Grammy Award nominations for Best Metal Performance. Despite having garnered mediocre or negative reviews, the material on the EP has been credited with helping expand the group's MTV audience in the early 1990s.

== Background and songs ==
Hidden Treasures is a rarities compilation that features songs that Megadeth had recorded for a number of projects, but had not released on one of the band's studio albums.^{[†]} Most of these were contributions to film soundtracks. In 1989, Megadeth recorded a version of Alice Cooper's "No More Mr. Nice Guy" for the soundtrack to the Wes Craven-directed horror film Shocker. It marks drummer Nick Menza's recording debut with the band. The recording was released as a single and peaked at number 13 on the UK Singles Chart in 1990. "Go to Hell" appeared on the Bill and Ted's Bogus Journey soundtrack in 1991. The song features the same prayer, "Now I Lay Me Down to Sleep", used in "Enter Sandman" by Metallica, and can be heard at the beginning of the track.

The band contributed three songs to soundtracks in 1993. "Angry Again", recorded during the sessions for Countdown to Extinction, appeared on the soundtrack to Last Action Hero and received a nomination for "Best Metal Performance" at the 1993 Grammy Awards. The song has appeared on several of the band's compilations. "Breakpoint" appeared on the soundtrack for the Super Mario Bros. film. "99 Ways to Die" was recorded for the soundtrack to The Beavis and Butt-head Experience and released as a single and a music video. It was nominated in the "Best Metal Performance" category at the 1995 Grammy Awards.

"Diadems" was released on the Demon Knight soundtrack in 1995. In addition to soundtrack contributions, the band submitted a cover of Black Sabbath's "Paranoid" for the tribute album Nativity in Black in 1994. It was nominated for "Best Metal Performance" at the 1996 Grammy Awards. "Problems" is a Sex Pistols cover and was previously unreleased.

== Release and reception ==
Professional ratings
Review scores
Source	Rating
AllMusic	2/5 stars
Chicago Tribune	1.5/4 stars
Collector's Guide to Heavy Metal	8/10
The Rolling Stone Album Guide	2/5 stars

While initially released in Europe as a bonus disc for a special edition of Youthanasia, Hidden Treasures was released as a stand-alone EP in Japan and the US on July 18, 1995. It debuted at number 90 on the Billboard 200 chart and sold 13,000 copies in its first week. By December 2005, Hidden Treasures sold 286,000 copies in the United States. It also appeared on album chart in the UK, but did not achieve notable success. The album has gone out of print in the US, but was reissued in 2007 for the Japanese and European markets.

The EP has received generally mediocre reaction from critics. AllMusic's Stephen Thomas Erlewine wrote that the EP does not have many "first-rate songs" and that only "99 Ways to Die" made an impression. The Rolling Stone Album Guide was dismissive of the EP; the staff reviewer commented that the album is worth hearing only for "99 Ways to Die". Dean Golemis of the Chicago Tribune wrote that the album is "typical Megadeth" featuring "fast-forward riffing" and "snooty snarling" vocals. Carlos Ramirez from Noisecreep felt that the album contains many underrated songs that "also deserve their time in the spotlight" and highlighted the dueling guitar leads by Mustaine and Friedman featured in "Go to Hell". Despite the negative reviews, material featured on the EP has been credited with helping expand the group's MTV audience in the early 1990s.

== Track listing ==
All credits adapted from the Hidden Treasures liner notes.

No.	Title	Writer(s)	Original appearance	Length
1.	"No More Mr. Nice Guy" (Alice Cooper cover)	Alice Cooper; Michael Bruce	1989 – Shocker (soundtrack)	3:02
2.	"Breakpoint"	Dave Mustaine; David Ellefson; Nick Menza	1993 – Super Mario Bros. (soundtrack)	3:29
3.	"Go to Hell"	Mustaine; Ellefson; Marty Friedman; Menza	1991 – Bill & Ted's Bogus Journey (soundtrack)	4:36
4.	"Angry Again"	Mustaine	1993 – Last Action Hero (soundtrack)	3:47
5.	"99 Ways to Die"	Mustaine	1993 – The Beavis and Butt-Head Experience	3:58
6.	"Paranoid" (Black Sabbath cover)	Bill Ward; Tony Iommi; Geezer Butler; Ozzy Osbourne	1994 – Nativity in Black: A Tribute to Black Sabbath ~ Vol. 1	2:32
7.	"Diadems"	Mustaine	1995 – Demon Knight (soundtrack)	3:55
8.	"Problems" (Sex Pistols cover)	Johnny Rotten; Glen Matlock; Steve Jones; Paul Cook	1995 – A Tout le Monde	3:57
Total length:				29:16

Japanese edition^{[††]} and 2007 edition bonus tracks
No.	Title	Writer(s)	Original appearance	Length
1.	"A Tout le Monde" (radio edit)	Mustaine	1995 – A Tout le Monde	4:29
2.	"Symphony of Destruction" (demo)	Mustaine	1995 – A Tout le Monde	5:29
3.	"Architecture of Aggression" (demo)	Mustaine; Ellefson	1995 – A Tout le Monde	2:49
4.	"New World Order" (demo)	Mustaine; Ellefson; Friedman; Menza	1995 – A Tout le Monde	3:47

== Personnel ==
Credits are adapted from the liner notes.

Megadeth

- Dave Mustaine – guitars, lead vocals
- David Ellefson – bass, backing vocals
- Marty Friedman – guitars and backing vocals (tracks 2–8)
- Nick Menza – drums

Production

- Desmond Child – production (track 1)
- Max Norman – production, engineering, and mixing (tracks 2–8)
- Dave Mustaine – production (tracks 2–8), co-production (track 1), mixing (tracks 7, 8)

== Chart performance ==
Chart (1995)	Peak position
Japanese Albums Chart (Oricon)	13
UK Albums Chart (OCC)	28
US Billboard 200 (Billboard)	90

Chart (2026)	Peak position
Croatian International Albums (HDU)	20

== Certifications ==
Region	Certification	Certified units/sales
Canada (Music Canada)	Gold	50,000^{^}
^{^} Shipments figures based on certification alone.

== Notes ==
- † "Breakpoint" and "Go to Hell" appear as bonus tracks on the original Japanese release of Countdown to Extinction
- †† The track listing of the Japanese edition features the bonus tracks as tracks 1–4; "No More Mr. Nice Guy" becomes track 5, and all subsequent songs are also displaced four tracks back.
- ††† À tout le monde is listed as a radio edit on the 2007 edition, but it is the regular album version.
- †††† New World Order is listed as a demo on the 2007 edition, but it actually is the final version with the guitar parts in the pre-chorus section that were missing in the demo version on the 2004 remastered re-release bonus track of Youthanasia.

== Bibliography ==
- Gulla, Bob (2006). The Greenwood Encyclopedia of Rock History: The Grunge and Post-Grunge Years, 1991–2005. Greenwood Press. ISBN 0-313-32981-8.
- Buckley, Peter (2003). The Rough Guide to Rock. Rough Guides. ISBN 1-84353-105-4.
- Rees, Dafydd; Crampton, Luke, eds. (1999). Rock stars encyclopedia. DK Publishing. ISBN 0-7894-4613-8.
- Guglielmi, Federico (2002). Grande enciclopedia rock. Giunti Editore. ISBN 88-09-02852-X.
- Ellefson, David; McIver, Joel (2013). My Life With Deth: Discovering Meaning in a Life of Rock & Roll. Howard Books. ISBN 978-1-4516-9988-3.
