= Angry Again =

Single by Megadeth

from the album Last Action Hero: Music from the Original Motion Picture and Hidden Treasures
- Released: June 14, 1993
- Recorded: 1993
- Genre: Heavy metal
- Length: 3:47
- Label: Columbia
- Songwriter: Dave Mustaine
- Producers: Dave Mustaine, Max Norman

Megadeth singles chronology
"Skin o' My Teeth" (1993)	"Angry Again" (1993)	"99 Ways to Die" (1993)

"Angry Again" is a 1993 heavy metal song by Megadeth, written by frontman Dave Mustaine. The song was written exclusively for inclusion in the 1993 satirical action film Last Action Hero, directed by John McTiernan and starring Arnold Schwarzenegger. The track featured on the film's soundtrack. "Angry Again" never appeared on any of the band's official studio albums but was included on their 1995 EP, Hidden Treasures, and several later compilations.

The song was a financial success; it charted well and was positively received by critics. It was nominated for "Best Metal Performance" at the 1993 Grammy Awards, which was the band's fourth consecutive nomination in the category. It became a fan favorite and continues to be played live on a semi-regular basis.

== Development ==
Dave Mustaine wrote "Angry Again" in one day, penning the lyrics while half asleep, listening to the melody of "Should I Stay or Should I Go" by The Clash. The song was initially recorded during the Countdown to Extinction tour. When Mustaine wrote the song, he was angry with his band, promoters, and a lot of different parts of the organization, and had problems with drug use at the time. The culmination of his stress and problems inspired him to write the track, which was appropriately titled "Angry Again". According to Mustaine, he wrote the song during a spur of the moment: "I wrote 'Angry Again' right after I got out of a treatment center in Arizona. They had done one of those happy little 1990s interventions where everybody who's not loaded gets to point the finger at everyone who is. And the day I got out of rehab, they threw me into a studio in Phoenix where I wrote 'Angry Again' for the movie The Last Action Hero."

"Angry Again" was written for inclusion in the film Last Action Hero, which was expected to be a blockbuster. The film had followed the success of Arnold Schwarzenegger's previous film, Terminator 2: Judgment Day, and was directed by John McTiernan, the filmmaker behind popular films like Predator, Die Hard, and The Hunt for Red October, and had an $85-million production budget. The movie, however, was viewed as a large financial disappointment in its theatrical release, earning only $137,298,489 worldwide, and was considered a flop. Though panned by several critics, Last Action Hero became a cult classic several years later.

Despite the financial failure of the film itself, its soundtrack was very successful, featuring popular hits like "Big Gun" by AC/DC, which was a number one on Hot Mainstream Rock Tracks; "What the Hell Have I" by Alice in Chains; and songs by Anthrax, Aerosmith, Buckethead, Queensrÿche, and Def Leppard. "Big Gun" was also, however, nominated for a Golden Raspberry Award for Worst Original Song, but lost to "Whoomp! (There It Is)" from Addams Family Values. "Angry Again" charted on the Hot Mainstream Rock Tracks chart as well, at number eighteen, and was the best-received song on the album in terms of critical reception.

== Reception ==
The album for Last Action Hero received positive reviews, and "Angry Again" received a nomination for "Best Metal Performance" at the 1993 Grammy Awards, the fourth consecutive nomination by the band, out of the eight nominations the band has received in total. It was nominated against Iron Maiden's "Fear of the Dark", Suicidal Tendencies's "Institutionalized", and White Zombie's "Thunder Kiss '65", losing the award to Ozzy Osbourne's "I Don't Want to Change the World", which became Ozzy's first Grammy win. Megadeth continued to be nominated two more times in a row and was later nominated five more times in total, tying them as the most nominated band in the category, with Metallica.

The song became a live staple for Megadeth in the 1990s and appeared on the 1995 EP Hidden Treasures, which debuted at ninety on the Billboard 200 and featured two additional Grammy-nominated songs by Megadeth. The song developed a fan following within the Megadeth community and became a fan favorite, being featured on the 2005 album Greatest Hits: Back to the Start. Fans voted on the track listing on the album, and "Angry Again" came in at number five, beating out more well-known songs like "Hangar 18" and "Symphony of Destruction". It also appeared on further compilations, such as That One Night: Live in Buenos Aires, Arsenal of Megadeth, Anthology: Set the World Afire, and Warchest. The track continues to be played live and remains a semi-regular staple, praised for Mustaine's unique vocal performance.

== Music video ==
"Angry Again" was accompanied by a music video, directed by Wayne Isham, who directed several other Megadeth videos, including "Train of Consequences", "Sweating Bullets", "99 Ways to Die", and "Symphony of Destruction". The video, which was played heavily by MTV, contains shots of each of the band members in very foggy and atmospheric shots and is intercut with scenes from Last Action Hero. The video promoted the song, band, and the film.

== Charts ==
Chart (1993)	Peak position
US Mainstream Rock (Billboard)	18

== Personnel ==
- Dave Mustaine – vocals, rhythm guitar
- Marty Friedman – lead guitar
- David Ellefson – bass
- Nick Menza – drums
