= The System Has Failed =

2004 studio album by Megadeth

Studio album by Megadeth
- Released: September 14, 2004
- Recorded: October 23, 2003 – April 9, 2004
- Studios: Ocean Way, Nashville; Emerald Entertainment, Nashville; Phase Four, Tempe
- Genres: Heavy metal; thrash metal
- Length: 48:24
- Label: Sanctuary
- Producers: Dave Mustaine; Jeff Balding

Megadeth chronology
Still, Alive... and Well? (2002)	The System Has Failed (2004)	Greatest Hits: Back to the Start (2005)

Singles from The System Has Failed
- 1. "Die Dead Enough" Released: June 26, 2004; 2. "Of Mice and Men" Released: 2004; 3. "The Scorpion" Released: May 10, 2005

Alternate cover

The System Has Failed is the tenth studio album by American thrash metal band Megadeth, released on September 14, 2004. It was the band's second and final studio album to be distributed by Sanctuary Records. The System Has Failed was the first album to be released after Dave Mustaine recovered from his arm injury sustained in 2002. It is also the first of four Megadeth studio albums not to include original bassist and co-founder David Ellefson. The album features former Megadeth member Chris Poland (guitar), who previously performed on Killing Is My Business... and Business Is Good! (1985) and Peace Sells... but Who's Buying? (1986), and session musicians Vinnie Colaiuta (drums) and Jimmie Lee Sloas (bass).

The System Has Failed received positive reception from critics and debuted at number 18 on the Billboard 200. The album was generally thought of as being a return to form for the band, after the release of more commercially accessible albums through the 1990s. "Die Dead Enough" and "Of Mice and Men" were released as singles in 2004, and "The Scorpion" was released as a single in 2005. The track "Back in the Day" was featured in the Duck Dodgers episode "In Space, No One Can Hear You Rock" in 2005, which featured an animated version of the band performing the song.

== Background and production ==
In 2002, Megadeth frontman Dave Mustaine announced that he was disbanding the band due to an arm injury that rendered him unable to play guitar. In a statement published on April 3, 2002, he stated that doctors expected that it would take about a year before he would recover from the injury. However, it was uncertain as to how complete of a recovery it would be. Mustaine stated his hopes to regain the ability to play guitar. He subsequently recovered following months of physical therapy.

The album was recorded at Ocean Way and Emerald Entertainment in Nashville, Tennessee and at Phase Four Studios in Tempe, Arizona. In a promotional statement from Megadeth's then-label Sanctuary Records, Mustaine clarified that recording the album had been "liberating", due to having more control over the record than he'd had since the first two Megadeth records. Mustaine also noted that he initially took a casual approach to the album, starting out working three hours a night, four days a week.

Originally intended to be a solo album by Mustaine, the record was re-branded with the Megadeth name as a result of contractual obligations owed to Mustaine's publishing company. Mustaine co-produced the record with Jeff Balding, who had previously engineered Cryptic Writings and Risk. Upon restarting Megadeth, Mustaine contacted bassist and founding member David Ellefson about resuming bass guitar duties for the band. Those efforts were ultimately fruitless, however. Ellefson claimed that Mustaine was not financially willing to pick up "where it was when [the band] broke up" and did not return to Megadeth.

=== Artwork ===
The cover art was designed by Mike Learn, and features Vic Rattlehead at a lectern in front of the United States Supreme Court building selling a not-guilty verdict to then U.S. President George W. Bush. Saluting is Hillary Clinton, next to former President Bill Clinton. Behind President Bush, Vice President Dick Cheney holds a briefcase labeled "plan B". Behind Cheney are several other Bush Administration officials: then National Security Advisor (and later Secretary of State) Condoleezza Rice, Defense Secretary Donald Rumsfeld, and Attorney General John Ashcroft. The $100 bills on the cover depict Vic Rattlehead's face rather than the one of Benjamin Franklin.

== Release and promotion ==
The System Has Failed was released on September 14, 2004, through Sanctuary Records. Three days previously, on September 11, the album was made available for streaming on the VH1 website. The album debuted at number 18 on the Billboard 200, with 46,000 units sold in its first week. By December 2007, The System Has Failed had sold 196,000 copies in the United States and by October 2019 has sold an additional 200,000 copies. In addition, the album had managed to chart in the top 20 in several other countries, including Canada, Finland, and Sweden.

Still needing a band with whom to tour, Mustaine hired longtime drummer Nick Menza in July, while newcomers James MacDonough (bass) and Glen Drover (guitar) both joined in September (although Jeff Waters of Annihilator nearly joined). Five days before the start of the tour, however, Menza was sent home. His place was filled by Shawn Drover, brother of guitarist Glen Drover. The album's promotional tour, the Blackmail the Universe Tour, launched on October 23, 2004, in Reno, Nevada and featured Earshot as a supporting act. This tour would also spawn the That One Night: Live in Buenos Aires double live album, released in September 2007.

Two music videos were made to promote the album. The first was "Die Dead Enough", which was directed by Thomas Mignone. "Of Mice and Men" was selected as the second video from the album. In this video, the then-new Megadeth lineup is shown performing. The majority of the video was filmed in Los Angeles, California on January 20, 2005. Many fans turned up to be in the video through a contest held by Sanctuary Records. A third video was made for "Back in the Day" in 2005, but was unreleased until September 15, 2014, to celebrate ten years since the album's release. "Back in the Day" was also featured in an episode of the Duck Dodgers TV series, along with an animated performance from the band. The episode which the song was featured in, "In Space, No One Can Hear You Rock", aired on November 4, 2005, after having been delayed a week.

A remastered version of The System Has Failed, along with The World Needs a Hero, was reissued on CD, vinyl, and digital download on February 15, 2019.

== Songs ==
"Die Dead Enough" was the lead single from The System Has Failed. Mustaine wrote it when he was asked to write a song for the movie Tomb Raider II, but the proposed budget for recording was too low and the deal fell through. Later on, the song was supposed to be featured in the film Saw, but ultimately was not for undisclosed reasons. This was later followed by the release of "Of Mice and Men". Additionally, "Kick the Chair" was released as a free promotional download via Megadeth's website in May 2004, several months prior to the album's release. This version of the song was described by Mustaine as being a final mix, but was not the mix that would appear on the record. "Blackmail the Universe" was also released as a promotional single. "Tears in a Vial" was written by Mustaine shortly after Megadeth disbanded in 2002 about a decision to trade success for happiness. The sixth track on the album, "I Know Jack", is an instrumental featuring a sample of Texas Senator Lloyd Bentsen's famous response to Indiana Senator Dan Quayle during a 1988 vice-presidential debate. "Shadow of Deth" consists of Mustaine reciting Psalm 23. The Latin phrase heard at the beginning of the track, "Auxilium meum a Domino," translates to "My help comes from the Lord."

== Critical reception ==
Professional ratings
Review scores
Source	Rating
AllMusic	4/5 stars
Blistering	8/10
Brave Words & Bloody Knuckles	9/10
Drowned in Sound	4/10
KNAC	4/5 stars
Metal Forces	8/10
NOW	3/5 stars
Revolver	4/5 stars
Rock Hard	8.5/10

The System Has Failed has received mainly positive reviews from critics, with some of them describing the album as a return to form. AllMusic's Jason Birchmeier commented that Megadeth hasn't sounded this vital since Countdown to Extinction, and called the album "damn near perfect". Brave Words & Bloody Knuckles reviewer Martin Popoff described the album as a mix of several previous records, and praised a number of the album's tracks. Popoff acknowledged the fact that Mustaine only used hired session players on the album was the album's only low point. Jeff Kerby of KNAC gave a positive, if at times slightly sarcastic review, as well as a detailed track-by-track commentary. David E. Gehlke of Blistering said despite that Mustaine's best days were behind him, this record comes across as a "warm return"; although the album fails to recapture past glory, it succeeds in being a solid, reliable metal album. In addition, Gehlke noted that Mustaine's vocals were "as strong as ever", but panned the album for the lack of any "thrash burners". Neil Arnold of Metal Forces had a slightly different opinion, and credited this album for putting Megadeth "back on track". He praised the album artwork, which reminded him of the 80's style of graphics. Another positive review was posted on Entertainment Weekly. Reviewer Nancy Miller called The System Has Failed Megadeth's best since 1990's Rust in Peace and praised Mustaine's collaboration with Poland, calling the result "Righteous!"

In spite of a largely positive reception, not all reaction was completely positive. Tom Day of musicOMH had a mixed reaction to the album. Day called "Die Dead Enough" a "slice of classic 'Deth", while noting its slightly more mainstream sound. Later in his review, however, he noted that with "Shadow of Deth", it seemed that Mustaine had run out of ideas. Nick Lancaster from Drowned in Sound also reacted unenthusiastically towards the album, saying it was a "severe case of St. Anger syndrome". However, he added there were "occasional moments of the old magic, but they're few and far between".

== Track listing ==
All tracks are written by Dave Mustaine.

No.	Title	Length
1.	"Blackmail the Universe"	4:33
2.	"Die Dead Enough"	4:18
3.	"Kick the Chair"	3:57
4.	"The Scorpion"	5:59
5.	"Tears in a Vial"	5:21
6.	"I Know Jack"	0:40
7.	"Back in the Day"	3:27
8.	"Something That I'm Not"	5:07
9.	"Truth Be Told"	5:40
10.	"Of Mice and Men"	4:04
11.	"Shadow of Deth" (Psalm 23, credited to David)	2:15
12.	"My Kingdom"	3:03
Total length:		48:24

Japanese edition bonus track
No.	Title	Length
13.	"Die Dead Enough" (video)	4:31
Total length:		52:55

2019 reissue bonus tracks
No.	Title	Length
13.	"Time/Use the Man" (live)	6:30
14.	"The Conjuring" (live)	5:26
Total length:		60:20

== Personnel ==
Production and performance credits are adapted from the album liner notes.

Megadeth

- Dave Mustaine – lead vocals, lead and rhythm guitar
- Chris Poland – lead guitar on all tracks except "I Know Jack", "Truth Be Told" and "The Scorpion"
- Jimmie Lee Sloas – bass guitar
- Vinnie Colaiuta – drums

Session musicians

- Chris Rodriguez – backing vocals (1–5, 7–10, 12)
- Celeste Amber Montague – voice of the Reporter on "Blackmail the Universe"
- Darien Bennett – voice of the General on "Blackmail the Universe"
- Ralph Patlan – voice of the Politician on "Blackmail the Universe", additional vocals (2, 7 and 9)
- Tim Akers – keyboards (1, 7–12)
- Eric Darken – percussion (1–2, 5, 7, and 9–10)
- Michael Davis – sound effects (1, 4 and 11)
- Robert Venable – additional vocals (2, 7 and 9)
- Lance Dean – additional vocals (2, 7 and 9)
- Charlie Judge – keyboards (2, 4 and 5)
- Jonathan Yudkin – strings (4–5 and 9), banjo ("Something That I'm Not")
- Scott Harrison – additional vocals (7 and 9)
- Justis Mustaine – background spoken part on "Something That I'm Not"

Production

- Produced and recorded by Jeff Balding and Dave Mustaine
- Mixed by Jeff Balding
- Assisted by David Bryant, Ralph Patlan, Scott Kidd, Jesse Amend, Lance Dean, and Jed Hackett
- Additional recording by David Bryant, Jed Hackett, and John Saylor
- Mastered by Adam Ayan
- Digital editing by Mark Hagen and Jed Hackett
- Production coordination by Mike "Frog" Griffith
- Cover art by Mike Learn, based on a concept by Dave Mustaine
- Design by t42design

== Charts ==
Album

Chart (2004)	Peak position
Australian Albums (ARIA)	57
Austrian Albums (Ö3 Austria)	43
Belgian Albums (Ultratop Flanders)	89
Belgian Albums (Ultratop Wallonia)	95
Canadian Albums (Billboard)	10
Danish Albums (Hitlisten)	38
Dutch Albums (Album Top 100)	32
Finnish Albums (Suomen virallinen lista)	12
French Albums (SNEP)	28
German Albums (Offizielle Top 100)	29
Irish Albums (IRMA)	32
Italian Albums (FIMI)	40
Japanese Albums (Oricon)	15
Norwegian Albums (VG-lista)	34
Polish Albums (ZPAV)	44
Scottish Albums (Official Charts)	51
Swedish Albums (Sverigetopplistan)	14
Swiss Albums (Schweizer Hitparade)	57
UK Albums (Official Charts)	60
UK Independent Albums (Official Charts)	8
UK Rock & Metal Albums (Official Charts)	14
US Billboard 200	18

Singles

Chart (2004–2005)	Single	Peak position
US Billboard Mainstream Rock Tracks	"Die Dead Enough"	21
US Billboard Mainstream Rock Tracks	"Of Mice and Men"	39
