= Of Mice and Men (disambiguation) =

Of Mice and Men is a 1937 novella by John Steinbeck.

Of Mice and Men may also refer to:

- Phrase from the poem "To a Mouse, on Turning Her Up in Her Nest With the Plough, November, 1785" by Robert Burns
- Of Mice and Men (play), 1937 play by John Steinbeck based on his novel
- Of Mice and Men (1939 film), based on the novel by John Steinbeck
- Of Mice and Men (1968 film), television film based on the novel
- Of Mice and Men (1981 film), made-for-television film featuring Whitman Mayo
- Of Mice and Men (1992 film), third movie adaptation of John Steinbeck's novel
- "Of Mice and Men" (comics), a 1999 Marvel Comics comic book story arc by Fabian Nicieza and Steve Skroce
- Of Mice & Men (band), a rock band from California
  - Of Mice & Men (album), the 2010 self-titled debut album by the band
- Of Mice and Men (opera), by American composer Carlisle Floyd
- "Of Mice and Men" (song), by the band Megadeth from the 2004 album The System Has Failed

== See also ==
- Mice and Men (film), a 1916 silent film based on a play by Madeleine Lucette Ryley
- Of Monsters and Men, an Icelandic indie folk band with a similar name.
