= 99 Ways to Die (song) =

1993 single by Megadeth

Promotional single by Megadeth

from the album The Beavis and Butt-Head Experience and Hidden Treasures
- Released: November 23, 1993
- Recorded: 1992
- Genre: Thrash metal; heavy metal
- Length: 3:58
- Label: Capitol
- Songwriter: Dave Mustaine
- Producers: Max Norman; Dave Mustaine

Megadeth singles chronology
"Angry Again" (1993)	"99 Ways to Die" (1993)	"Train of Consequences" (1994)

Music video
- "99 Ways to Die" on YouTube

"99 Ways to Die" is a song by the American thrash metal band Megadeth. The song was recorded for the soundtrack to The Beavis and Butt-head Experience, and was released as a promo single and a music video. The song was nominated in the "Best Metal Performance" category at the 1995 Grammy Awards.

== Background ==
"99 Ways to Die", is about band frontman Dave Mustaine's ex-fiancée, Diana.

The song has rarely been performed live by Megadeth, with it only appearing live a handful of times in 1995. Mustaine played the song for the first time in over 20 years at the "Rock 'N' Roll Fantasy Camp" in Deerfield Beach, Florida, in January 2022. The song was performed with some campers as well as Brittany Denaro (AKA Britt Lightning), guitarist for the band Vixen.

== Critical reception ==
The "Hidden Treasures" EP received generally mediocre reviews from critics, with "99 Ways to Die" being one of the only songs received well. AllMusic's Stephen Thomas Erlewine wrote that the EP does not have many "first-rate songs" and that only "99 Ways to Die" made an impression. The Rolling Stone Album Guide was dismissive of the EP; the staff reviewer commented that the album is worth hearing only for "99 Ways to Die".

== Track listing ==
All credits adapted from CD single.

No.	Title	Length
1.	"Beavis And Butt-Head Laugh"	0:11
2.	"Intro With Beavis And Butt-Head"	0:22
3.	"99 Ways To Die" (Edit)	3:39
4.	"Outro With Beavis And Butt-Head"	0:14
5.	"99 Ways To Die" (LP Version)	3:57

== Charts ==
Chart (1993)	Peak position
US Mainstream Rock (Billboard)	23

== Personnel ==
Credits are adapted from "Hidden Treasures" liner notes and "99 Ways to Die" CD.

Megadeth

- Dave Mustaine – guitars, lead vocals
- David Ellefson – bass, backing vocals
- Marty Friedman – guitars, backing vocals
- Nick Menza – drums

Production

- Production - Max Norman and Dave Mustaine
- Executive production - Mike Judge and Tony Berg
- Engineering - Max Norman
- Mixing: Max Norman and Dave Mustaine
- Musical supervision - John Cannelli
- Guitar/bass/amplifier technician - Michael Kaye
- Drum technician - Bruce Jacoby
