= Philips DP70 =

Model of motion picture projector

The DP70 is a model of motion picture projector, of which approximately 1,500 were manufactured by the Electro-Acoustics Division of Philips between 1954 and about 1968. It is notable for having been the first mass-produced theater projector in which 4/35 and 5/70 prints could be projected by a single machine, thereby enabling wide film to become a mainstream exhibition format, for its recognition in the 1963 Academy Awards, which led to it being described as "the only projector to win an Oscar" (though this is technically incorrect, because the award was actually a Class 2 Oscar Plaque), and for its longevity: a significant number remained in revenue-earning service as of February 2014.

== Research and development ==
Small-scale attempts had been made to use wide film for commercial theater exhibition around the time of the conversion to sound, of which Fox Grandeur was technologically the closest to the format the DP70 was designed to facilitate the launch of, two decades later. One of the reasons these early systems failed to establish wide film as an industry standard was that the projectors developed for them were incompatible with the existing 4/35 standard. In order to be able to project both, therefore, theaters had to be equipped with two sets of projectors, which involved significant extra cost and in some cases architectural modifications to projection booths.

The DP70 (DP stands for "Double Purpose") was invented and developed by a team headed by Jan-Jacob Kotte of Philips between 1952 and 1954, as part of the Todd-AO system. A core objective of the project was to create a single machine that could project both the Todd-AO 5/70 format and the 4/35 format which was, and was likely to remain, the dominant standard for theater exhibition.

== Service history ==
The first DP70s were exported from The Netherlands to the United States in the fall of 1954, and were used for the roadshow release of the feature that was made to launch Todd-AO, Oklahoma! DP70s were used exclusively as part of the Todd-AO system for the first few years, but were eventually sold independently by Philips and its resellers to theaters worldwide. The DP70 was widely praised for its versatility, reliability and ease of use, which was recognized by the Academy in 1963. During the 1960s, DP70 installations appeared throughout the world, mainly in prestige, downtown first run venues. As a result of the machine's success, dual gauge projectors were quickly developed and launched by Philips's main competitors, including Cinemeccanica of Italy and Century of the United States.

Almost 60 years after the first DP70s shipped from the factory, a significant number remain in regular, commercial use worldwide. In 1972 the cinema division of Philips was bought out by Kinoton, a German company that had handled European sales and support for Philips cinema products since 1949. After-sales support for the DP70 passed to Kinoton at that point, which continued to manufacture and distribute replacement parts until the company was wound up in April 2014. Accessories and modifications are available (some of them were made by Kinoton, others by aftermarket manufacturers) that will enable the DP70 to project every 5/70 and 4/35 format that was ever used on a significant scale, including the 35mm digital optical sound systems launched in the 1990s, e.g. Dolby Digital, and for 70mm DTS.

Though the projection of film itself in mainstream, first run theaters has been superseded almost completely by digital projection at the time of writing, DP70s remain in service in cinematheque-type venues that specialize in showing repertory and archive titles. Theaters in which DP70s are still running today include the Egyptian Theatre in Hollywood, the Gartenbaukino in Vienna, Kino in Rotterdam, the Pictureville cinema at the UK's National Media Museum, Worcester Polytechnic Institute in Worcester MA, the Hollywood Theatre in Portland, OR and Rigoletto in Stockholm.

== Nomenclature ==
The fact that the DP70 was a Dutch machine developed specifically for a customer in the United States resulted in it being known by several different names. The DP70 was Philips's original model name for the projector, and this is what projectionists in Europe tend to call it. In the United States, the American Optical Company (the AO in Todd-AO) used the Philips factory model number, EL4000/01 (the 60 Hz variant – the 50 Hz one, for sale in European markets, was model no. EL4000/00), as their catalog number for the machine. It was eventually marketed independently of Todd-AO by Norelco (a contraction of "North American Philips Electrical Company", i.e. the brand name used by Philips in the US). The DP70 was originally sold in the United States simply as the "Norelco Universal 70/35mm Motion Picture Projector". After its acknowledgment in the 1963 Oscars, Norelco rebranded it as the AA (Academy Award). An improved version of the projector was also launched in 1963, which was branded as the AAII in the US.

All the projector mechanisms were built at the Philips factory in Eindhoven, though much of the peripheral hardware for the machines that were exported to the United States, e.g. bases and reel magazines, was manufactured locally, initially by the American Optical Company and later by Ballantyne.

== Features ==
=== Overview ===
The DP70 consists of a monocoque, cast iron chassis containing the mechanism, which is completely oil-immersed on the non-operating side. Jan-Jacob Kotte believed that the use of heavier materials to absorb vibration reduced instability in the projected image, and this is certainly reflected in the design of the DP70: a complete outfit, including the bases and reel magazines, weighs 1,004 lbs – which is half a ton. The DP70 was also significantly more expensive than any single gauge theater projector on the market: a US customer was quoted $6,225 for one in 1966 ($44,942 in 2014, adjusted for CPI inflation), which was around the cost of a typical three-bedroom suburban home at the time. The price asked for a double set without lenses asked in West-Germany in 1956 was 42,510.00 Marks, which at the rate of exchange at that time (4:1), related to $10,627.50 for the pair, or $5,313.75 per projector. That price was higher than 35mm only projectors, but still reasonably low if compared to competitors like Bauer U2. The low price and reasonable quality was an important part of the success. Because the DP70 was built to commission for a customer in the United States, it is a very unusual example of a European-designed piece of industrial machinery with fasteners that have SAE rather than metric dimensions.

=== Removable components ===
Detachable reel magazines can be fitted (e.g. to enable the projection of nitrate film in accordance with safety regulations), or removed (e.g. to enable projection using an external film transport device such as a platter or tower, or to fit an external audio reader) as needed. Special fire trap rollers for nitrate were also available, to comply with fire regulations in some jurisdictions. Separate magnetic and analog optical audio heads are built into the mechanism itself, enabling all 6/70 magnetic and 4/35 optical formats to be projected without the need to adjust or replace any audio components. The change of gauge is done by swapping some gate components, pad roller assemblies, reel spindles and the lens, and in some cases making minor adjustments to the lamphouse. This procedure can be completed by a competent projectionist in 5–10 minutes, which is a major reason for the DP70's popularity with venues that show 4/35 and 5/70 prints interchangeably.

=== Cooling ===
Because the DP70 was intended for use with 70mm film and in large theaters with a long throw to a big screen, several features were included to disperse the intense heat generated by the more powerful lamps with which it was often used. The gate assembly includes copper components which are silver-plated, and a liquid-cooled plate that is fitted with a water pipe surrounding the aperture opening. The use of liquid recirculating equipment and distilled water was encouraged. A single-blade shutter designed to rotate at very high speed (up to 3,600 RPM) doubles as a cooling fan. Unlike other projectors of its hi-power kind, the DP70 did not offer forced-air cooling of the film itself, which is known to be a key feature to prevent overheating of the film and the major nitrate-fire prevention measure. A water cooled pre-shield just assists in keeping the gate and metal parts cold, not the film.

=== Motor ===
The DP70 as shipped from the factory was equipped for dual speed operation, at 24fps (the frame rate at which almost all 4/35 prints with a combined soundtrack are projected) and 30fps, the frame rate used in the original Todd-AO system. The original version of the DP70 used separate drive motors for 24fps and 30fps operation, whereas the AAII had a single motor and a dual locking pulley mechanism on the main drive shaft to change the speed of the mechanism. There were also several other more minor changes in the AAII.

Because many of the DP70s remaining in use today are in repertory venues that screen a wide range of formats, including prints of silent movies that require a lower frame rate than 24, very many have now received aftermarket modifications that will typically enable any speed between 16 and 30. Since US market DP70's came factory equipped with capacitor start capacitor run synchronous motors that lock their speed (1,800 RPM in the USA) to the AC line frequency (60 Hz in the USA), the most common way of doing this has been to add a variable frequency solid state AC inverter (Baldor Inverter) and suitable 3-phase motor. Most European units were sold employing asynchronous motors, which added slip to the synchronous speed (1500 RPM at 50 Hz) to achieve the required 24 frames (1440 RPM) and 30 frames (1800 rpm), without gearing requirements in the original construction.

== Gallery ==
The Philips DP70
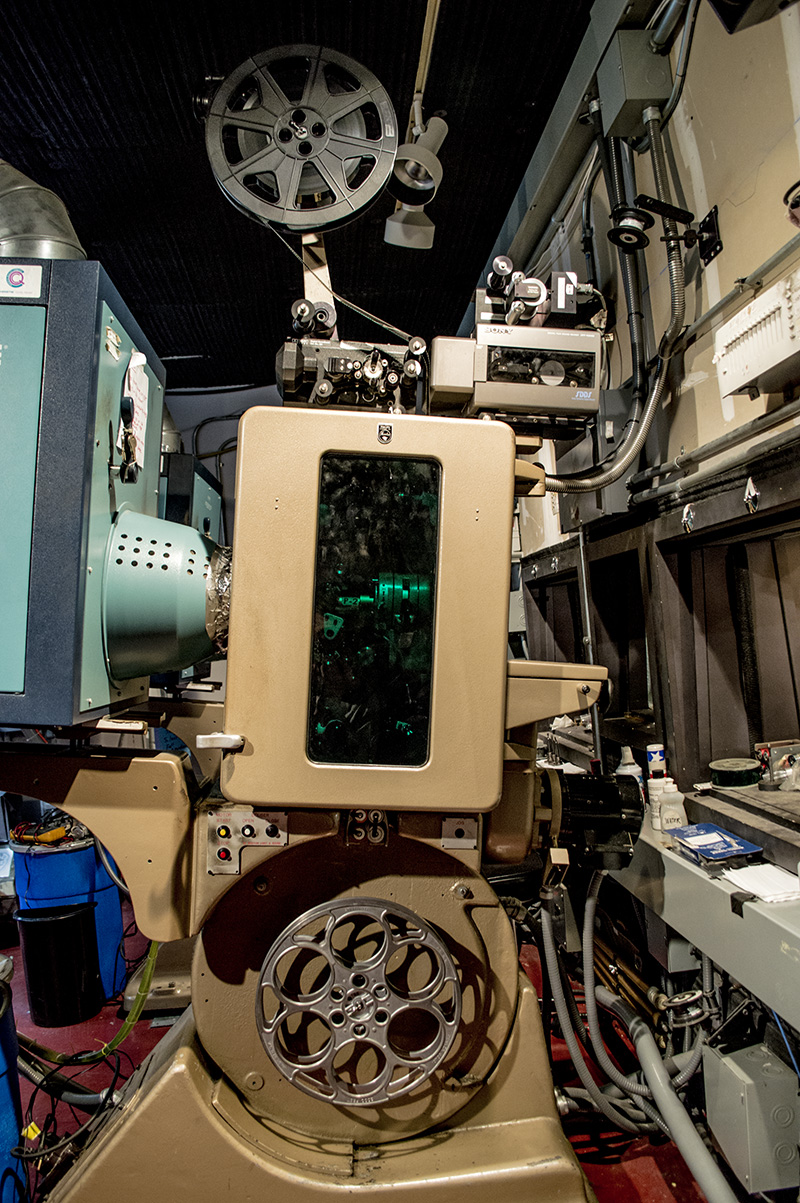
The DP70 pedestal and mechanism seen from the operating side, with the mechanism cover closed.

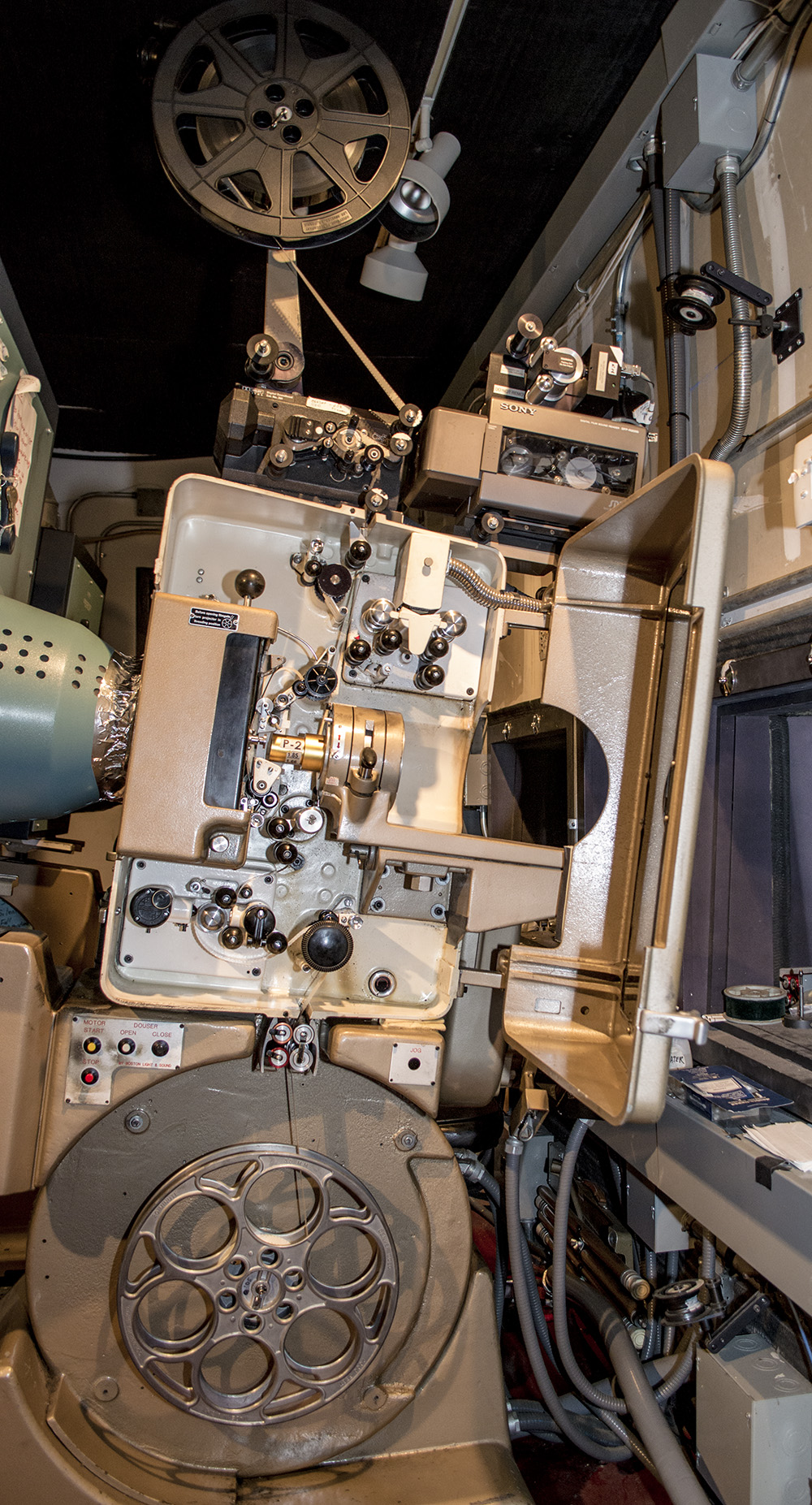
The DP70 pedestal and mechanism seen from the operating side, with the mechanism cover open.

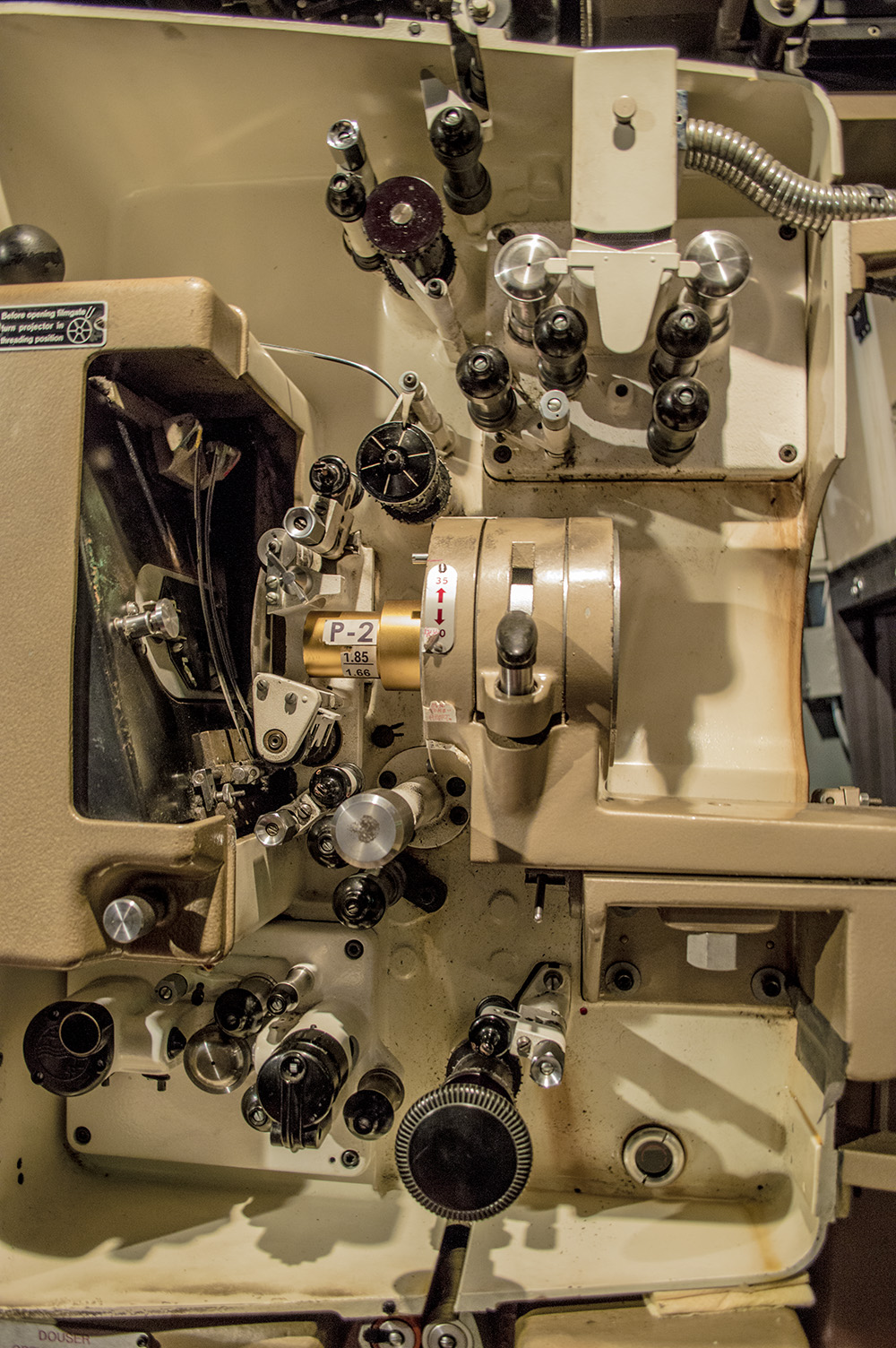
A detailed view of the mechanism, with the gate retracted. The projector is seen here in 35mm configuration.

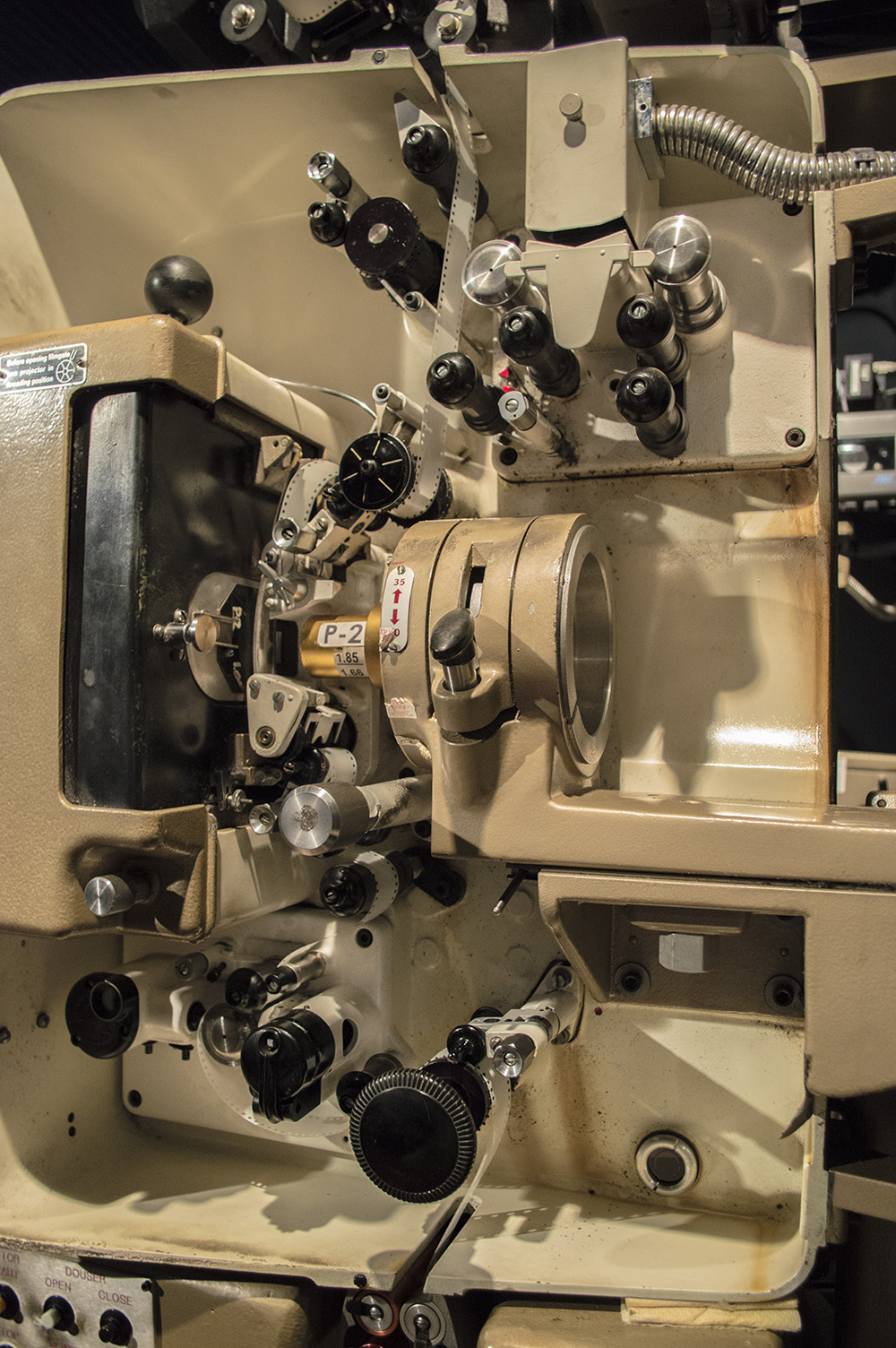
35mm film threaded in the mechanism (white spacing), through the picture gate and analog optical audio head.

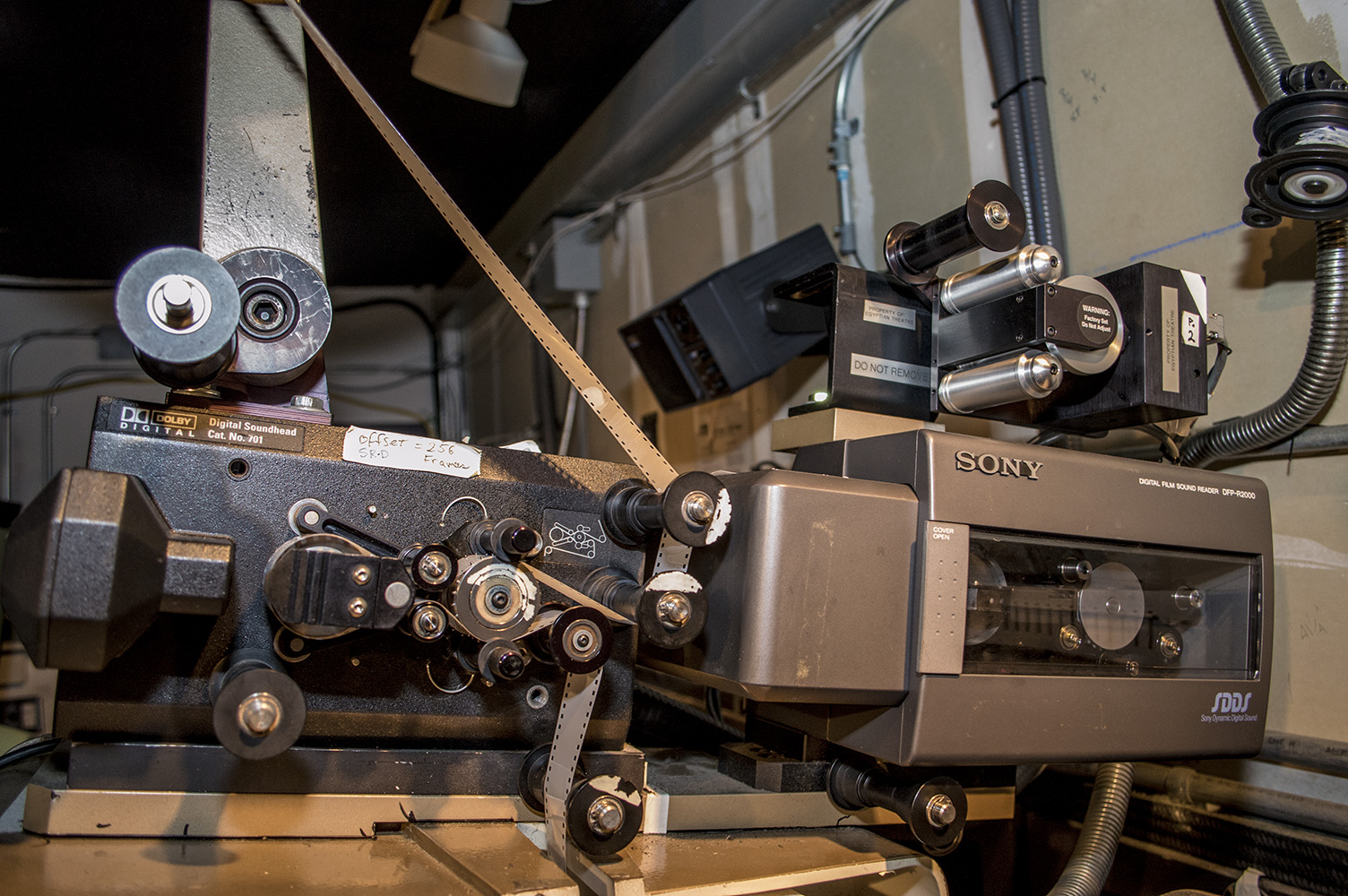
Digital optical penthouse readers fitted to the top of the mechanism chassis. Clockwise from left: 35mm Dolby Digital (threaded), 70mm DTS and 35mm SDDS.

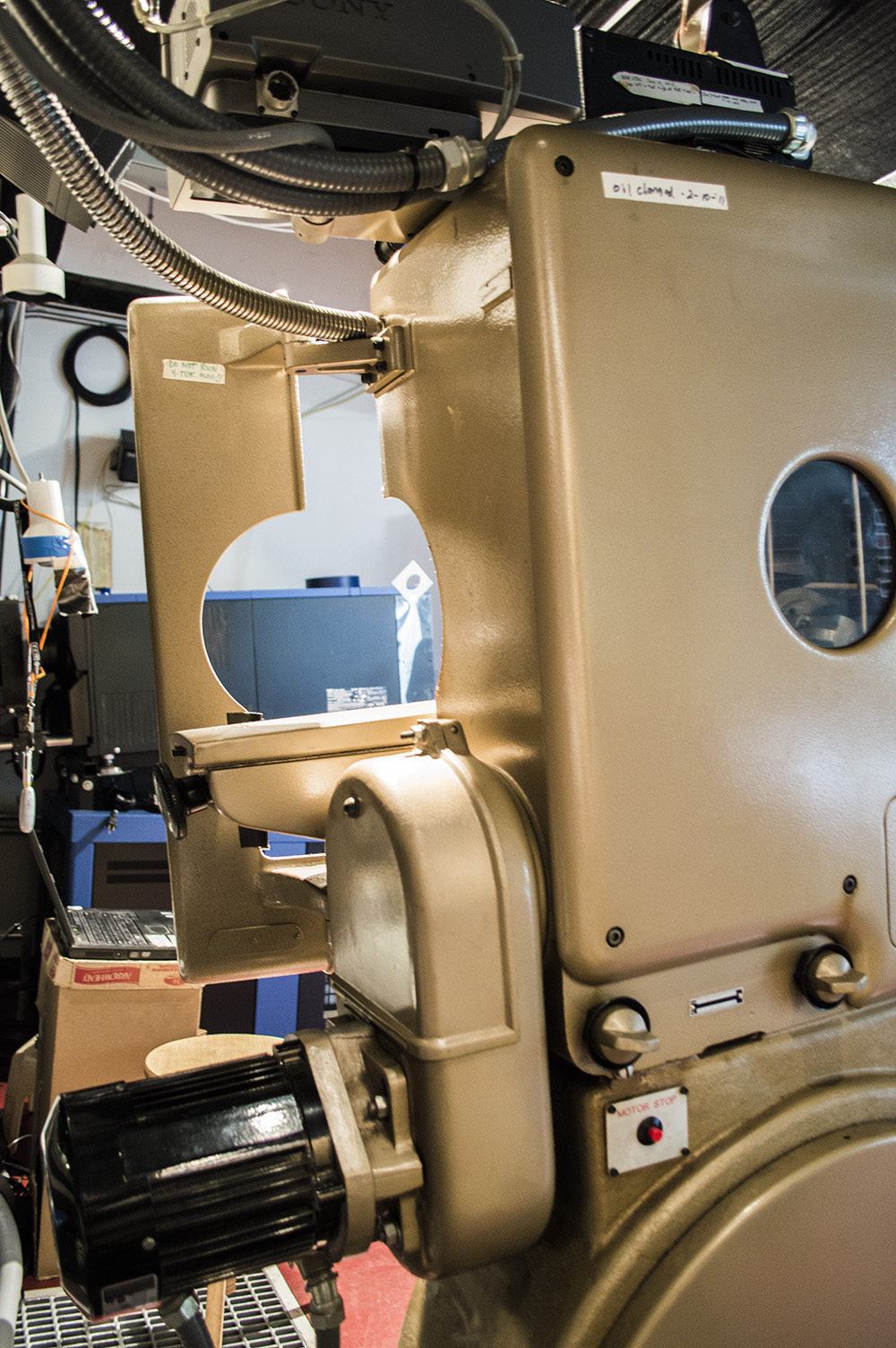
The non-operating side of the projector, showing the retrofitted motor for variable speed operation (bottom left). A viewing porthole (center right) enables the projectionist to confirm visually that oil is circulating while the mechanism is running.

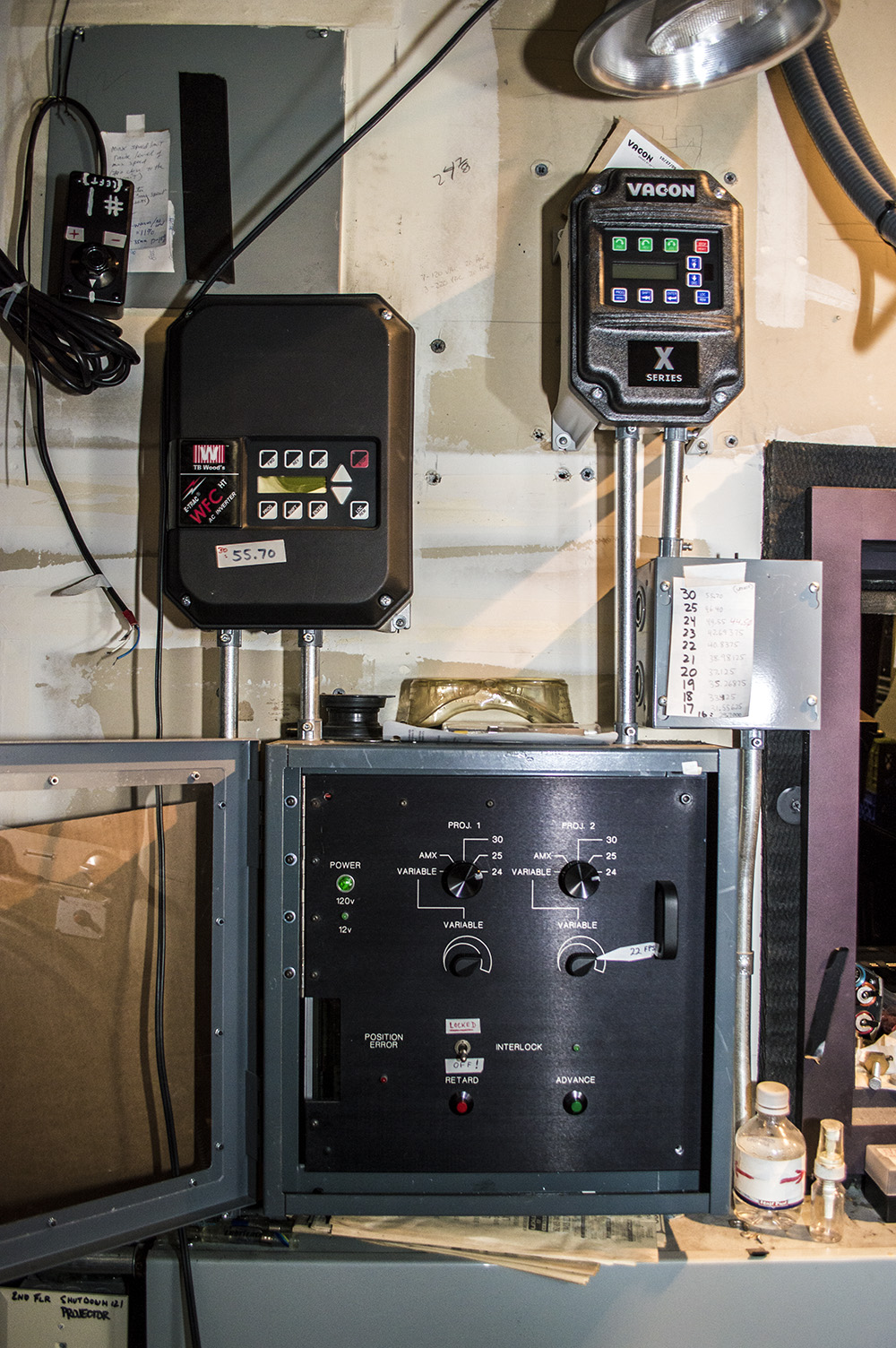
The custom-built power supply control panel for the motors of the two Philips DP70 projectors in the Egyptian Theatre, Hollywood. Any frame rate between 16 and 30 can be selected, and the two motors can also be interlocked to enable the projection of left and right eye 3D prints.

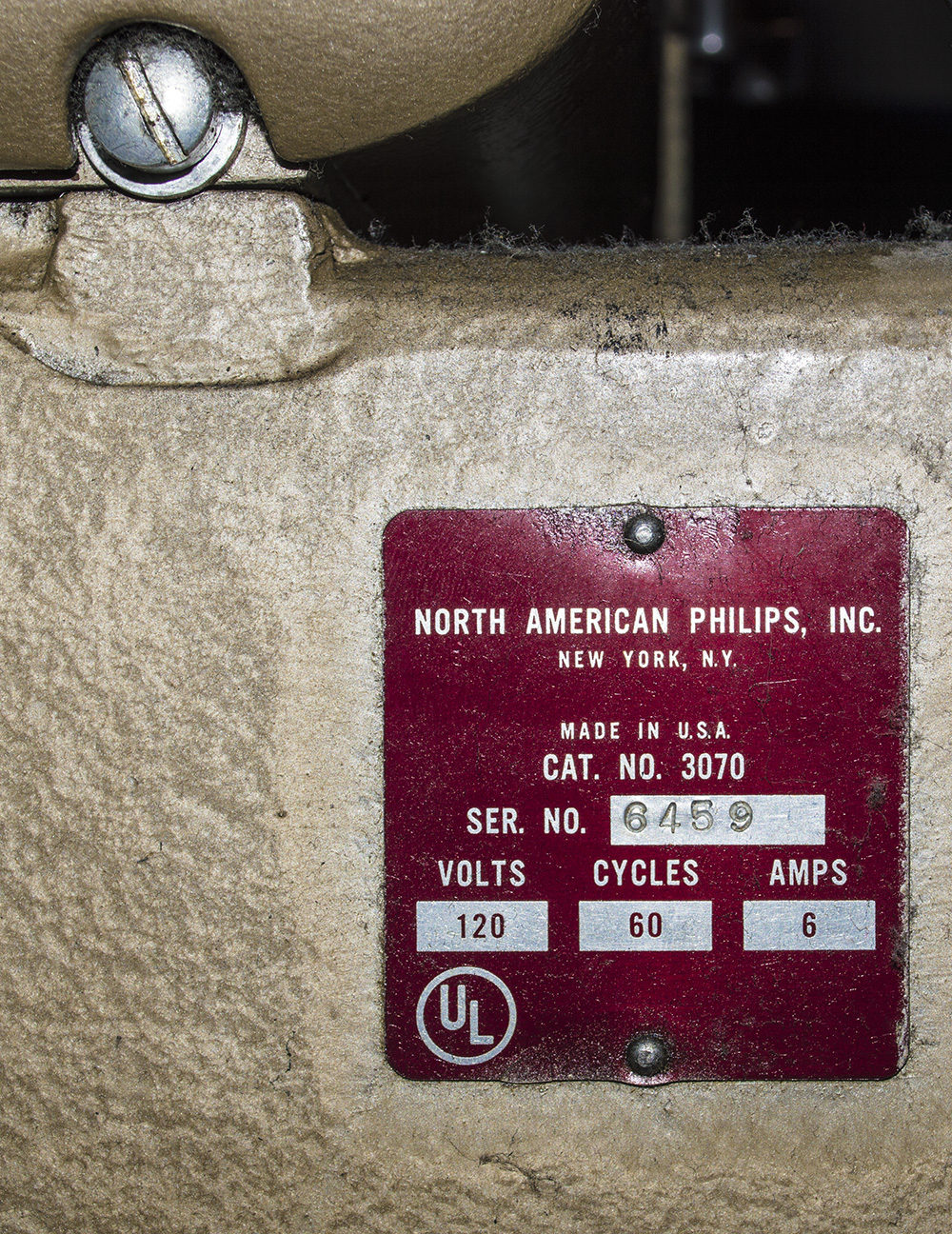
The manufacturer's data plate for one of the two DP70s in the Egyptian Theatre, Hollywood. It is attached to the pedestal, and therefore the "made in USA" statement is technically correct. The mechanism, however, was manufactured at the Philips factory in Eindhoven, The Netherlands.

== Bibliography ==
- Belton, John, Widescreen Cinema (Cambridge, MA: Harvard University Press, 1992), ISBN 0-674-95261-8
