= List of 8 channel SDDS films =

This is a list of films encoded in the SDDS sound format with eight channels of sound, rather than the usual six.

The first film to use this format was Last Action Hero (1993), and the final film was Surf's Up (2007).

== 1993 ==
- Geronimo: An American Legend
- In the Line of Fire
- Last Action Hero
- Rudy

== 1994 ==
- True Lies
- Forrest Gump
- Immortal Beloved
- Little Big League
- Mary Shelley's Frankenstein
- The Next Karate Kid

== 1995 ==
- Bad Boys
- Desperado
- Devil in a Blue Dress
- Dracula: Dead and Loving It
- First Knight
- Hideaway
- Johnny Mnemonic
- Judge Dredd
- Legends of the Fall
- Mortal Kombat
- Toy Story
- Never Talk to Strangers
- Sense and Sensibility
- Batman Forever

== 1996 ==
- Alaska
- The English Patient
- The Fan
- Fly Away Home
- From Dusk till Dawn
- Heavy Metal (re-release 8-channel remix)
- Mary Reilly
- Matilda
- Multiplicity
- Mrs. Winterbourne
- Race the Sun
- Screamers
- Twister
- Space Jam
- The Cable Guy

== 1997 ==
- Addicted to Love
- Air Force One
- Anaconda
- Con Air
- Das Boot: The Director's Cut
- Contact
- The Fifth Element
- Gattaca
- Ghosts of Mississippi
- Masterminds
- Men In Black
- My Best Friend's Wedding
- The Second Jungle Book: Mowgli & Baloo
- Titanic

== 1998 ==
- Apt Pupil
- The Avengers
- Godzilla
- Les Misérables
- Out of Sight
- The Rugrats Movie
- The Replacement Killers
- The Negotiator
- Armageddon
- Small Soldiers
- Lethal Weapon 4
- Paulie
- A Bug's Life
- Bride of Chucky
- Dennis the Menace Strikes Again
- Babe: Pig in the City
- The Prince of Egypt
- Saving Private Ryan

== 1999 ==
- Blue Streak
- Crazy in Alabama
- Star Wars: Episode I – The Phantom Menace
- Tarzan
- American Beauty
- The Haunting
- Stuart Little
- Baby Geniuses
- Toy Story 2
- The End of the Affair
- The Adventures of Elmo in Grouchland
- Deep Blue Sea
- The Matrix
- Three Kings
- The Insider
- Austin Powers: The Spy Who Shagged Me

== 2000 ==
- All the Pretty Horses
- Charlie's Angels
- Erin Brockovich
- Finding Forrester
- Girl, Interrupted
- X-Men
- High Fidelity
- Hollow Man
- The Perfect Storm
- The 6th Day
- U-571
- Vertical Limit
- Fantasia 2000
- What Lies Beneath
- Gladiator
- Meet the Parents
- Mission: Impossible 2
- Gun Shy
- Mission to Mars
- The Flintstones in Viva Rock Vegas
- The Contender
- The Legend of Bagger Vance
- The Cell
- Cast Away
- Unbreakable
- Rugrats in Paris: The Movie
- Dr. Seuss' How the Grinch Stole Christmas

== 2001 ==
- Final Fantasy: The Spirits Within
- Glitter
- Windtalkers
- Harry Potter and the Sorcerer's Stone
- A Knight's Tale
- A.I. Artificial Intelligence
- Ocean's Eleven
- Pearl Harbor
- Jimmy Neutron: Boy Genius
- Monsters, Inc.
- Shrek
- Osmosis Jones
- Cats & Dogs

== 2002 ==
- Black Hawk Down
- Ice Age
- Scooby-Doo
- Minority Report
- Spider-Man
- Stuart Little 2
- Men in Black II
- The Time Machine

== 2003 ==
- Bad Boys II
- Big Fish
- Charlie's Angels: Full Throttle
- Intolerable Cruelty
- Terminator 3: Rise of the Machines
- Underworld
- Rugrats Go Wild
- Anger Management
- The Jungle Book 2
- Bruce Almighty
- Finding Nemo

== 2004 ==
- Anacondas: The Hunt for the Blood Orchid
- Criminal
- Ocean's Twelve
- Spider-Man 2
- Garfield: The Movie
- The Polar Express
- The Incredibles

== 2005 ==
- Fun with Dick and Jane
- The Legend of Zorro
- Robots
- Stealth
- Zathura: A Space Adventure
- Hitch
- Pooh's Heffalump Movie
- Bewitched
- Chicken Little
- Yours, Mine & Ours
- The Pacifier
- Wallace & Gromit: The Curse of the Were-Rabbit
- Charlie and the Chocolate Factory
- Madagascar
- Valiant

== 2006 ==
- The Da Vinci Code
- Ice Age: The Meltdown
- Open Season
- Cars
- Garfield: A Tail of Two Kitties
- Night at the Museum
- Charlotte's Web
- Eragon
- RV
- Talladega Nights: The Ballad of Ricky Bobby

== 2007 ==
- Ghost Rider
- Spider-Man 3
- Surf's Up
