= That One Night: Live in Buenos Aires =

Live album by Megadeth
- Released: September 4, 2007
- Recorded: October 9, 2005, in Buenos Aires, Argentina
- Genres: Heavy metal, hard rock, thrash metal
- Length: 1:38:22
- Label: Image Entertainment
- Director: Michael Sarna
- Producers: Michael Sarna; Shalini Waran

Megadeth Live chronology
United Abominations (2007)	That One Night: Live in Buenos Aires (2007)	Warchest (2007)

Megadeth video chronology
Arsenal of Megadeth (2006)	That One Night: Live in Buenos Aires (2007)	Rust in Peace: Live (2010)

That One Night: Live in Buenos Aires is a live album from American heavy metal band Megadeth which was released on CD and DVD formats. It features a live concert recorded in Buenos Aires on October 9, 2005, at the Obras Sanitarias Stadium. The performance is segued by cuts of Dave and Glen performing a few acoustic songs for some fans on the lawn outside of the band's hotel. It was at this concert that Dave Mustaine announced that Megadeth would continue on past the 2005 tour.

There are also four currently unreleased songs from the performance, missing from either the CD or DVD version: ("The Scorpion", "Train of Consequences", "Of Mice and Men" and "Sweating Bullets"). The 2 CD version was released on September 4, 2007. It was originally intended to be released at the same time as the DVD. The DVD was certified gold in the US & Argentina, it went platinum in Canada. units and was voted Best DVD in the 2007 Burrn! magazine Reader's Poll. This is the only release by Megadeth to feature bassist James MacDonough. He did not record with the band on any studio albums and departed from the band in 2006 and was replaced by bassist James LoMenzo before production on the following studio album United Abominations (2007) began.

== Reception ==
Professional ratings
Review scores
Source	Rating
AllMusic	4/5 stars
About.com	4/5 stars
Sea of Tranquility	4.5/5 stars
PopMatters	8/10 stars

Allmusic's Greg Prato rated the album at four stars and called That One Night "further hard proof" that Megadeth is "one of the most precise and tight thrash bands".

About.com's Chad Bowar also rated the album at four stars and stated "everything came together well for this release. The crowd is outstanding, even singing along to guitar riffs, and the band is in great form. The audio quality is excellent, and captures enough crowd noise without being distracting. Megadeth is one of the great thrash bands of all time, and this live CD is a good representation of their repertoire".

PopMatters's Andrew Blackie wrote in his page and praised That One Night as a work superbly filmed, focusing on both capturing the facial expressions of the band members in mid-solo and the flashing light show, and the reaction of the bordering on over-enthusiastic crowd, who seem to know every word of every song, juxtaposing this with occasional footage of an incognito acoustic performance for fans earlier in the day. Blackie gave the album 8/10.

== Track listing ==
=== CD ===
All music and lyrics by Dave Mustaine, except where noted

Disc 1
No.	Title	Lyrics	Music	Length
1.	"Jet Intro"			0:35
2.	"Blackmail the Universe"			4:08
3.	"Set the World Afire"			5:27
4.	"Skin o' My Teeth"			3:22
5.	"Wake Up Dead"			3:35
6.	"In My Darkest Hour"	Mustaine, David Ellefson		6:07
7.	"Die Dead Enough"			3:55
8.	"She-Wolf"			3:31
9.	"Reckoning Day"	Mustaine, Ellefson	Mustaine, Marty Friedman	4:39
10.	"A Tout le Monde"			4:28
11.	"Angry Again"			3:36

Disc 2
No.	Title	Lyrics	Music	Length
1.	"Hangar 18"			5:06
2.	"Return to Hangar"			3:51
3.	"I'll Be There"	Mustaine, Bud Prager	Mustaine, Friedman	5:36
4.	"Tornado of Souls"	Mustaine, Ellefson		5:22
5.	"Trust"		Mustaine, Friedman	6:00
6.	"Something That I'm Not"			4:46
7.	"Kick the Chair"			4:03
8.	"Coming Home"			2:35
9.	"Symphony of Destruction"			4:23
10.	"Peace Sells"			4:40
11.	"Holy Wars... The Punishment Due" (with "Silent Scorn" used as a taped outro)			8:33

=== DVD ===
1. "Blackmail the Universe"
2. "Set the World Afire"
3. "Wake Up Dead"
4. "In My Darkest Hour"
5. "She-Wolf"
6. "Reckoning Day"
7. "A Tout le Monde"
8. "Hangar 18
9. "Return to Hangar"
10. "I'll Be There"
11. "Tornado of Souls"
12. "Trust"
13. "Something That I'm Not"
14. "Kick the Chair"
15. "Coming Home"
16. "Symphony of Destruction"
17. "Peace Sells"
18. "Holy Wars... The Punishment Due"
19. "Silent Scorn (tape)"

=== Bonus feature ===
1. "Symphony of Destruction (Alternate Track)"

=== Unreleased songs from the performance ===
1. "The Scorpion"
2. "Train of Consequences"
3. "Of Mice and Men"
4. "Sweating Bullets"

== Personnel ==
- Dave Mustaine – guitars, lead vocals
- Glen Drover – guitars, backing vocals
- James MacDonough – bass, backing vocals
- Shawn Drover – drums

=== Production credits ===
- Michael Sarna – director, producer
- Shalini Waran – producer
- Dave Mustaine– audio production
- Jeff Balding – audio production, mixing
- Dean Gonzalez – editor
- Michael Palmero – editor
- Gary Haber – executive producer
- John Dee – executive producer
- Kevin Gasser – executive producer

== Charts ==
Chart (2007)	Peak position
Australian ARIA DVDs	6
Finnish DVDs	1
Japanese DVDs	109
Billboard Music DVDs	12

== Certifications ==
Region	Certification	Certified units/sales
Australia (ARIA)	Gold	7,500^{^}
Canada (Music Canada)	Platinum	10,000^{^}
United States (RIAA)	Gold	50,000^{^}
^{^} Shipments figures based on certification alone.
