= Last Action Hero (soundtrack) =

1993 American action film soundtrack

Last Action Hero: Music from the Original Motion Picture
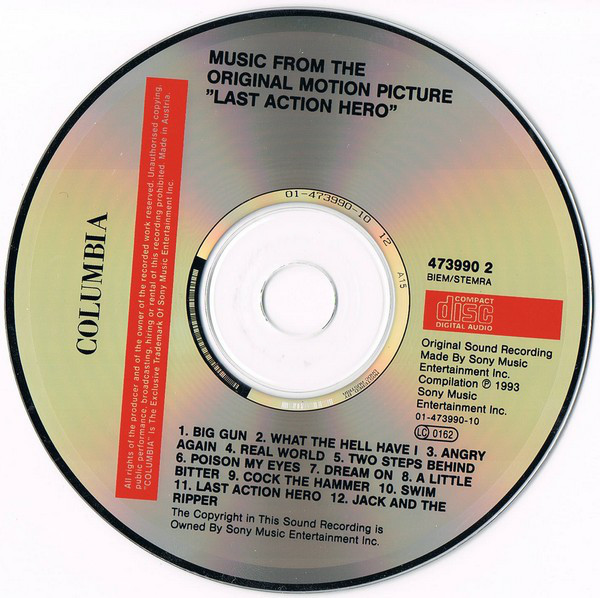

Soundtrack album by various artists
- Released: June 8, 1993
- Genres: Heavy metal; hard rock; film score
- Length: 55:18
- Label: Columbia

Singles from Last Action Hero
- 1. "Big Gun" Released: May 24, 1993; 2. "Real World" Released: May 31, 1993; 3. "What the Hell Have I" Released: June 7, 1993; 4. "Angry Again" Released: June 14, 1993; 5. "Two Steps Behind" Released: August 24, 1993

Last Action Hero: Music from the Original Motion Picture is the soundtrack promoting the film Last Action Hero directed by John McTiernan starring Arnold Schwarzenegger. It was released on 8 June 1993 by Columbia Records. Among the performers whose songs were used on the soundtrack were AC/DC, Alice in Chains, Anthrax, Def Leppard, Fishbone, Megadeth, and Queensrÿche.

On July 10, the album reached number 7 on the US Billboard 200 chart. On August 24, it was certified platinum in the United States for selling one million copies. This certification was granted by the Recording Industry Association of America (RIAA). Unlike the film, the soundtrack received favorable reviews and proved to be successful. Critics praised it for the selection of artists and its diversity.

== Singles ==
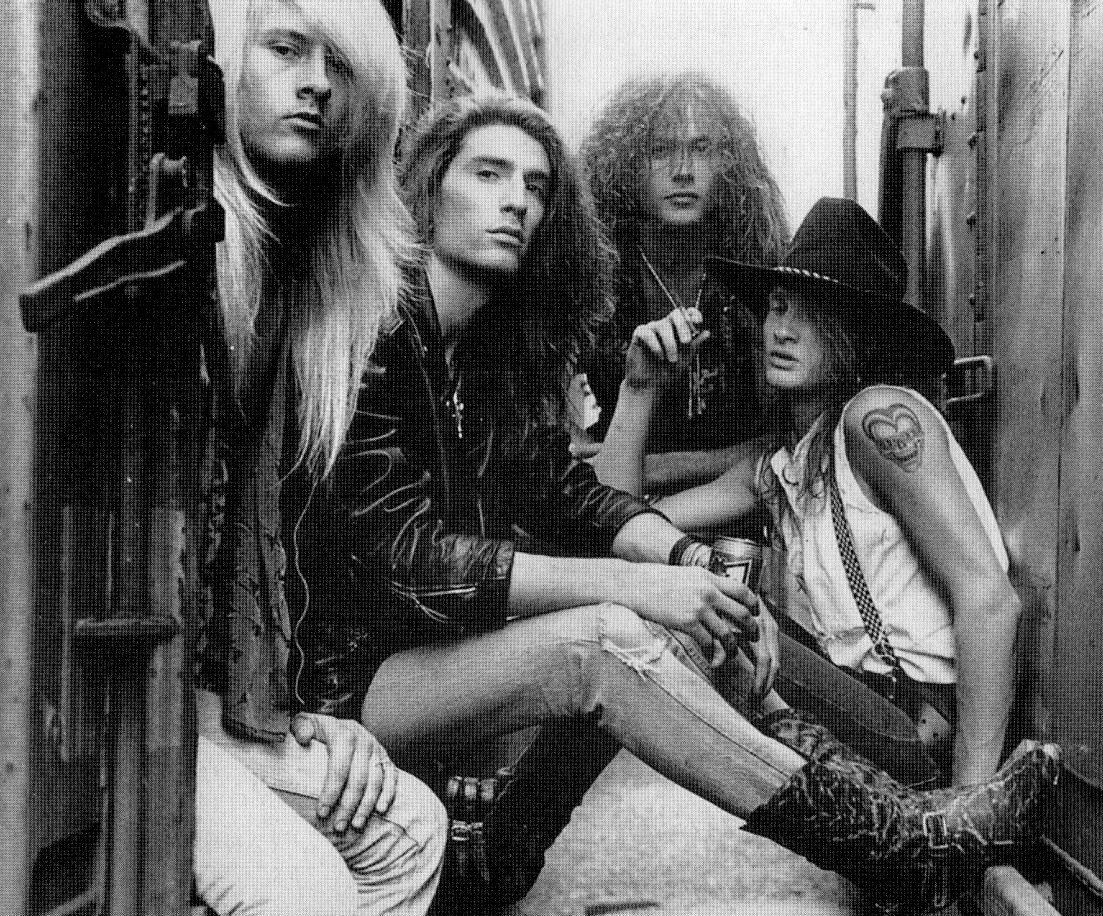
Band Alice in Chains (pictured in 1988) were the only performers to include two songs on the soundtrack

The Last Action Hero: Music from the Original Motion Picture soundtrack features twelve tracks. Some artists specifically wrote premiere compositions for it, including "Big Gun" by AC/DC, "Real World" by Queensrÿche, and "Last Action Hero" by Tesla. "Real World" was created based on suggestions from Michael Kamen, who was friends with the members of Queensrÿche and had previously collaborated with them on their debut album The Warning (1984) and the single "Silent Lucidity" (1990). Guitarist Michael Wilton admitted that: "Kamen told us he wanted a real haunting ballad, but nothing too sentimental. He also said the song should start slow, then finally break loose and really hit hard." Meanwhile, Tommy Skeoch from Tesla argued that "it was actually the third or fourth time we were asked to do a movie, but it finally worked out this time. When we got the call about the movie, I felt good about it from the start. We were already writing songs for our next album [Bust a Nut, 1994], but we thought, why not write a song, it's just the right scenario. We wrote it in an hour and a half."

Jerry Cantrell, the vocalist and guitarist of Alice in Chains, claimed that the band did not write the songs "What the Hell Have I" and "A Little Bitter" specifically for the movie. He said that "we were working on 'What the Hell Have I' and 'A Little Bitter' when we were asked to contribute to the soundtrack, and we thought they would be perfect. We're really happy with both songs, especially since they were the first recordings we did with our new bass player, Mike Inez." The musicians recorded both songs in the spring of 1993 during a break in their concert tour promoting the album Dirt (1992). (Note: Alice in Chains were the only artists to include two compositions on the soundtrack.) Anthrax guitarist Scott Ian admitted that the track "Poison My Eyes" came from the sessions for the band's sixth studio album Sound of White Noise (1993) – "When we were asked to do the soundtrack, we went back, changed the vocals again, and remixed the song. Then it sounded as good as everything on 'Sound of White Noise', so we knew it would be good for the soundtrack."

The composition "Angry Again" by Megadeth comes from the sessions for the band's fifth album, Countdown to Extinction (1992). Marty Friedman recalled: "We didn't want to just make a 'one-off' movie song, so we took the opportunity to play another Megadeth track. We worked on 'Angry Again' with the mindset that it was as important as 'Symphony of Destruction' or 'Sweating Bullets'."

While Def Leppard was busy touring, they sent a sketch of the song "Two Steps Behind", which acoustic version had appeared on the B-side of the single "Make Love Like a Man" a year earlier. Kamen added orchestral strings to the composition. The track "Swim" had appeared a few weeks earlier on Fishbone's album Give a Monkey a Brain and He'll Swear He's the Center of the Universe.

== Release and promotion ==
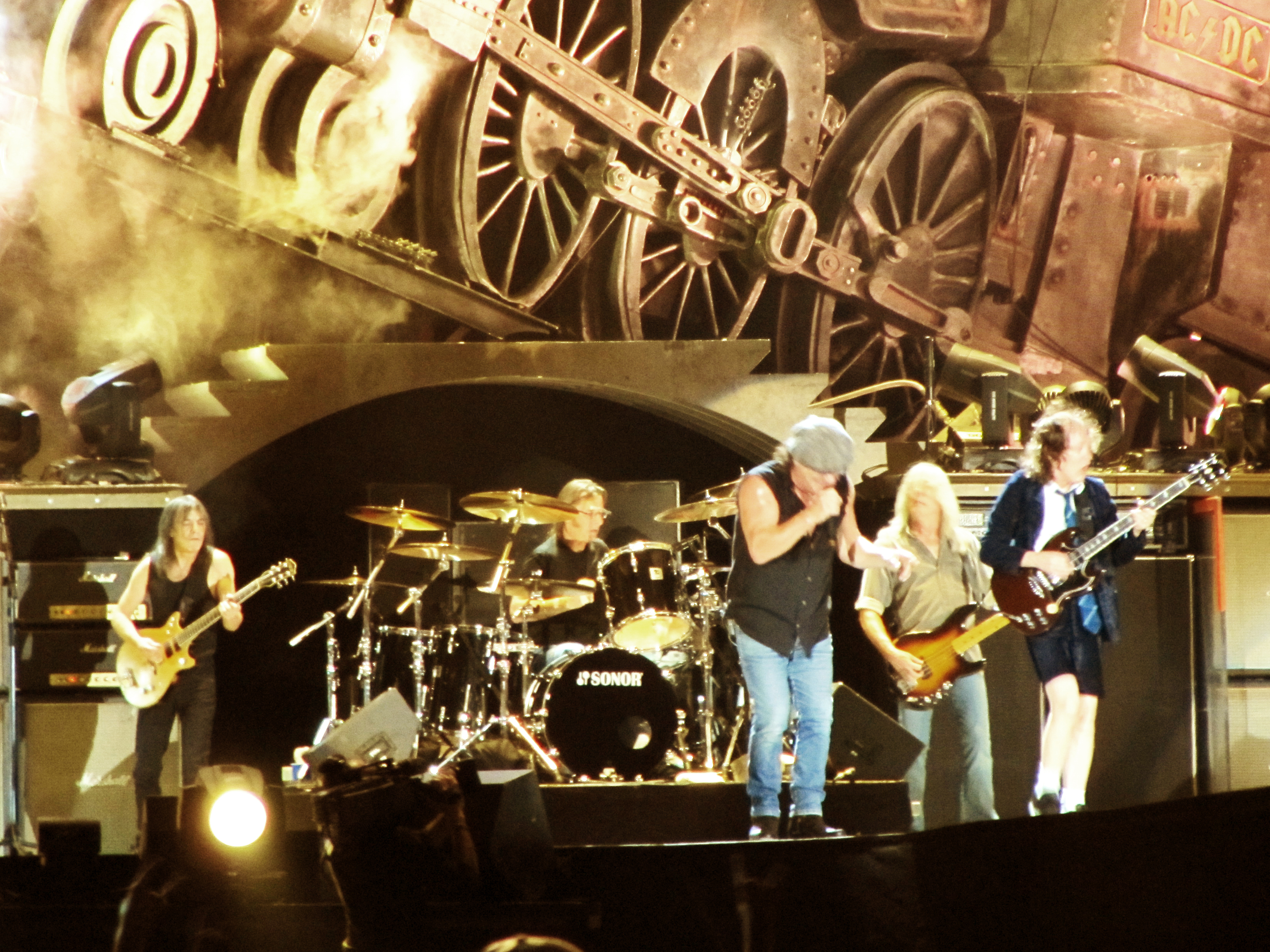
Soundtrack was promoted by the song "Big Gun" by the group AC/DC (pictured in 2009), which was their first to reach the top of the Billboard charts

The first single promoting the soundtrack was "Big Gun" by AC/DC, released on May 24. The music video was directed by David Mallet, featuring Arnold Schwarzenegger (dressed in a characteristic outfit inspired by a school uniform, a trademark of guitarist Angus Young's stage attire). The song was used in trailers promoting the film, as well as in TV and radio campaigns. Thanks to heavy rotation on MTV, "Big Gun" proved to be a success, becoming AC/DC's first song to top the Billboard's Album Rock Tracks chart.

Releasing the music video a month before the premiere of the film Last Action Hero (directed by John McTiernan) provided, according to Diarmuid Quinn, who was then Vice President of Marketing at Columbia Records, good promotion for both the soundtrack and the film. As part of further promotional efforts, four singles were released: "Real World" by Queensrÿche on May 31, "What the Hell Have I" by Alice in Chains on June 7, "Angry" Again by Megadeth on June 14, and "Two Steps Behind" by Def Leppard on August 24.

The premiere of Last Action Hero: Music from the Original Motion Picture took place on June 8. The album also included a live version of the song "Dream On" by Aerosmith, recorded during the MTV 10th Anniversary Special in 1991, where it was performed with an orchestra conducted by Kamen.

Expanding the promotional campaign, Columbia and Sony partnered with the fast-food chain Burger King and the retail chain Musicland, which distributed tray liners with discount coupons for purchasing the album and other movie-related merchandise at Sam Goody, Musicland, and Suncoast stores.

== Reception ==
=== Critical ===
Professional ratings
Review scores
Source	Rating
AllMusic	4.5/5 stars
Billboard	favorable
Circus	4/5 stars
Guitar School	favorable
Music Week	5/5 stars
Rock Hard	mixed

The soundtrack, unlike the film, which received negative reviews, turned out to be a success. Jason Birchmeier from AllMusic rated the soundtrack 4.5 stars out of 5, arguing: "The film soundtrack has significant lasting value, serving as a wonderful snapshot of the turbulent hard rock scene of the early '90s." The author pointed out that the greatest strength of the album is its diversity. Billboard magazine wrote that the soundtrack is "a monstrous collection of the heaviest metal names, ergo a feast for rock listeners". The reviewer described the entire release as a "powerful package, unrivaled in star value and musical caliber".

The industry magazine Guitar School, which titled its article Last Guitar Heroes, wrote: "When Columbia Pictures had to create the heaviest, most fierce, ass-kicking soundtrack the size of Arnold Schwarzenegger for their blockbuster hit, 'Last Action Hero', they called upon the world's best guitarists: Angus Young of AC/DC, who can spit out killer riffs like Jack Slater fires 9mm bullets; Marty Friedman, who can play with such incredible speed that compared to him, the chase scenes from the movie 'Raw Deal' [1986, dir. John Irvin] look like a walk in the park; Jerry Cantrell of Alice in Chains, who can make his Gibson Les Paul sound heavier than the solid titanium skeleton of the Terminator."

Michael Christopher, in his extensive article dedicated to the soundtrack, wrote that "looking back on it today, it's an interesting mix, but upon its release, it was the sonic embodiment of a changing musical landscape. It was a time when Aerosmith, Alice in Chains, Megadeth, and Cypress Hill made sense to be part of the same tracklist. When it comes to rock, grunge, metal, and where hip-hop intersects, the boundaries blurred."

=== Commercial ===
On 26 June 1993, the soundtrack debuted at number 12 on the Billboard 200 chart, making a "hot debut". By July 10, it had risen to the 7th position. Besides the United States, it also reached the 7th spot on the New Zealand Top 40 Albums Chart. On August 10, after reaching the threshold of 500,000 copies sold in the United States, it was certified gold by the Recording Industry Association of America (RIAA). Two weeks later, on August 24, the album surpassed one million copies sold, earning it a platinum certification from the RIAA. All five singles achieved placements in the top 25 of Billboard's Album Rock Tracks chart.

=== Listings ===
In 2014, Jennifer Wood from the Rolling Stone ranked the soundtrack in the "20 Soundtracks to Bad Movies" list. In her explanation, the author acknowledged that Arnold Schwarzenegger lacked acting talent, which, in her opinion, was one of the reasons why "John McTiernan's long-awaited post-postmodernist approach to He-Man action movies failed at the box office". Wood positively evaluated the soundtrack, stating that "it managed to surpass the source material reminiscent of a flop, thanks to songs by artists such as Alice in Chains, AC/DC, Def Leppard, Cypress Hill, Fishbone, Anthrax, and Aerosmith".

Year	Title	Publication	Position	Source
2014	20 Soundtracks to Bad Movies	Rolling Stone	–	

== Track list ==
Last Action Hero: Music from the Original Motion Picture track listing
No.	Title	Writer(s)	Producer(s)	Length
1.	"Big Gun" (AC/DC)	Angus Young; Malcolm Young	Rick Rubin	4:24
2.	"What the Hell Have I" (Alice in Chains)	Jerry Cantrell	Alice in Chains	3:58
3.	"Angry Again" (Megadeth)	Dave Mustaine	Max Norman; Dave Mustaine	3:58
4.	"Real World" (Queensrÿche)	Queensrÿche; Michael Kamen	Queensrÿche; James "Jimbo" Barton; Michael Kamen (co.)	4:21
5.	"Two Steps Behind" (Def Leppard)	Joe Elliott	Pete Woodroffe; Phil Collen; Joe Elliott; Rick Savage; Vivian Campbell	4:19
6.	"Poison My Eyes" (Anthrax)	Charlie Benante; Scott Ian; John Bush; Frank Bello	Dave Jerden; Anthrax	7:04
7.	"Dream On" (concert version) (Aerosmith)	Steven Tyler		5:42
8.	"A Little Bitter" (Alice in Chains)	Layne Staley; Cantrell; Mike Inez; Sean Kinney	Alice in Chains	3:52
9.	"Cock the Hammer" (Cypress Hill)	Louis Freese; Senen Reyes; Lawrence Muggerud	DJ Muggs	4:11
10.	"Swim" (Fishbone)	John Bigham	Terry Date; Fishbone	4:13
11.	"Last Action Hero" (Tesla)	Frank Hannon; Jeff Keith; Tommy Skeoch; Brian Wheat	Tesla	5:44
12.	"Jack and the Ripper" (Michael Kamen and the Los Angeles Rock and Roll Ensemble featuring Buckethead)	Michael Kamen	Michael Kamen; Steve McLaughlin (co.); Chris Brooks (co.)	3:43

Last Action Hero (Original Score from the Motion Picture) track listing
No.	Title	Writer(s)	Artist	Length
1.	"Jack the Ripper"	Kamen	Michael Kamen and Los Angeles Rock and Roll Ensemble	3:43
2.	"Danny" (features original music from Hamlet)	William Walton; Kamen; Brian Carroll	Michael Kamen	4:24
3.	"Jack Hamlet"	Kamen	Michael Kamen	1:13
4.	"River Chase"	Kamen	Michael Kamen	2:48
5.	"Benedict"	Kamen	Michael Kamen	2:45
6.	"Practice"	Kamen	Michael Kamen	4:19
7.	"Leo the Fart"	Kamen	Michael Kamen	4:32
8.	"Benedict Gets the Ticket"	Kamen	Michael Kamen	3:20
9.	"The Real World"	Kamen	Michael Kamen	3:43
10.	"Premiere"	Kamen	Michael Kamen	3:20
11.	"Saving Danny"	Kamen	Michael Kamen	1:39
12.	"Big Mistake"	Kamen	Michael Kamen	4:50

== Personnel ==
Based on liner notes:

=== Production ===
- Executive producer: Don Ienner
- Mastering: Eddy Schreyer at Future Disc, Hollywood

=== Graphic design ===
- Design: Doug Erb
- Art director: Mary Maurer

== Charts ==
Chart (1993)	Peak position
Austrian Albums (Ö3 Austria)	21
Canada Top Albums/CDs (RPM)	6
Dutch Albums (Album Top 100)	22
German Albums (Offizielle Top 100)	45
Hungarian Albums (MAHASZ)	16
New Zealand Albums (RMNZ)	7
Norwegian Albums (VG-lista)	19
Swedish Albums (Sverigetopplistan)	27
Swiss Albums (Schweizer Hitparade)	22
US Billboard 200	7

== Certifications ==
Country	Certification	Sales
United States (RIAA)	Platinum	1,000,000 (Note: Sales determined by the certificate granted on 24 August 1993.)
