= Blackmail the Universe =

2004 single by Megadeth

Promotional single by Megadeth

from the album The System Has Failed
- B-side: "Kick the Chair"
- Released: 2004
- Recorded: 2003–2004, October 9, 2005 (video)
- Studio: Ocean Way, Nashville; Emerald Entertainment, Nashville; Phase Four, Tempe
- Genre: Thrash metal
- Length: 4:33
- Label: Sanctuary
- Songwriter: Dave Mustaine
- Producers: Jeff Balding, Dave Mustaine

Megadeth singles chronology
| "Die Dead Enough" (2004) | "Blackmail the Universe" (2004) | "Of Mice and Men" (2004) |

Music video
- "Blackmail the Universe" on YouTube

"Blackmail the Universe" is a 2004 song by American thrash metal band Megadeth, written by frontman Dave Mustaine. It was released as a promotional single from their 2004 album The System Has Failed.

== Background ==
"Blackmail the Universe" is one of the most political songs Megadeth has, and is filled with attitude. The song starts with a news report of Air Force One being shot down. It features lyrics about nuclear war, terrorism and tensions in the Middle East. The song marks a return to the thrash metal that the band played in their early days. It has been described as similar to the song and album Rust in Peace, not only lyrically, but musically too.

"Blackmail the Universe" has been played 133 times live by the band. The concert tour for The System Has Failed was titled after this song.

== Music video ==
A music video for "Blackmail the Universe" was recorded on October 9, 2005, and was featured on That One Night: Live in Buenos Aires (although it was also released separately). The video was directed by Michael J. Sarna.

== Reception ==
"Blackmail the Universe" has been noted as a highlight of the album by many reviewers. It has been described as one of, if not "...the (band's) best since Countdown to Extinction". BraveWords praised Chris Poland's guitar work on the song. The song is the second most streamed from the album on Spotify.

== Other appearances ==
"Blackmail the Universe" has appeared on many Megadeth releases, including the greatest hits album Warheads on Foreheads and the aforementioned That One Night live album.

== Track listing ==
CD
| No. | Title | Length |
|---|---|---|
| 1. | "Blackmail the Universe" | 4:33 |
| 2. | "Kick The Chair" | 3:57 |

== Personnel ==
Production and performance credits are adapted from the album liner notes, except where noted.

Megadeth

- Dave Mustaine – lead vocals, lead and rhythm guitars (third and fourth solos)
- Chris Poland – lead guitar (first and second solos)
- Jimmie Lee Sloas – bass guitar
- Vinnie Colaiuta – drums

Additional musicians

- Eric Darken – percussion
- Tim Akers – keyboards
- Chris Rodriguez – backing vocals
- Celeste Amber Montague – voice of "The Reporter"
- Darien Bennett – voice of "The General"
- Ralph Patlan – voice of "The Politician"
- Michael Davis – sound effects

Production

- Produced and recorded by Jeff Balding and Dave Mustaine
- Mixed by Jeff Balding
- Assisted by David Bryant, Ralph Patlan, Scott Kidd, Jesse Amend, Lance Dean, and Jed Hackett
- Additional recording by David Bryant, Jed Hackett, and John Saylor
- Mastered by Adam Ayan
- Digital editing by Mark Hagen and Jed Hackett
- Production coordination by Mike "Frog" Griffith
- Artwork by Larry West
