= What the Hell Have I =

1993 single by Alice in Chains

Single by Alice in Chains

from the album Last Action Hero: Music from the Original Motion Picture
- Released: June 7, 1993
- Genre: Grunge; alternative metal
- Length: 3:58
- Label: Columbia
- Songwriter: Jerry Cantrell
- Producers: Andy Wallace; Alice in Chains

Alice in Chains singles chronology
"Rooster" (1993)	"What the Hell Have I" (1993)	"Down in a Hole" (1993)

Music video
- "What the Hell Have I" on YouTube

"What the Hell Have I" is a song by the American rock band Alice in Chains. It was originally featured on the soundtrack to the 1993 John McTiernan film Last Action Hero, starring Arnold Schwarzenegger. The single was released on June 7, 1993, and peaked at No. 19 on Billboard's Album Rock Tracks chart. It was included on their first greatest hits album, Nothing Safe: Best of the Box (1999). Also, a remixed version of the song was included on the band's box set collection, Music Bank (1999), as well as on their compilation album, The Essential Alice in Chains (2006).

== Origin and recording ==
The song was originally written for their breakthrough album, Dirt (1992), but was shelved at the time and used later for the Last Action Hero soundtrack. Contrary to popular belief, Jerry Cantrell did not actually use a traditional sitar during the recording session, although he did attempt to play one, but was unsure how. While experimenting with sounds, he adopted a guitar-sitar into the session to achieve the sound of the opening riff.

In the liner notes of 1999's Music Bank box set collection, guitarist Jerry Cantrell said of the song:

This and "A Little Bitter" were mixed by Andy Wallace because Toby [Wright] had a previous commitment, and they always bothered me because they were too "tinny" compared to our other stuff. So I was happy to see Toby finish his work off with the remixes [on Music Bank]. That's not to disrespect Andy, it's just that he wasn't there when they were being created. Toby's like a brother, he knows all our shit, all our personalities and we don't trust anybody unless we've got something on them.

== Release and reception ==
"What the Hell Have I" was released to radio stations on June 7, 1993 in support of Alice in Chains' appearance on the 1993 Lollapalooza tour. The single peaked at No. 19 on Billboard's Album Rock Tracks chart.

AllMusic's Jason Birchmeier said that the song is "on a par with those featured on the band's recent (and magnificent) Dirt album." Ned Raggett of AllMusic said that the song "isn't bad at all but on the flipside has little immediate surprise to offer to it."

== Music video ==
The music video for "What the Hell Have I" was released in 1993 and was directed by Rocky Schenck, who had previously directed the "We Die Young" and "Them Bones" music videos for the band, and who would later direct the music video for "Grind". In the music video, singer Layne Staley's face is projected on him with different expressions, while guitarist Jerry Cantrell is seen with the same contact lenses with a smiley face that was worn by Mr. Benedict (played by Charles Dance) in Last Action Hero. The video is available on the home video release Music Bank: The Videos (1999).

== Personnel ==
- Layne Staley – lead vocals
- Jerry Cantrell – guitar, electric sitar, vocals
- Mike Inez – bass
- Sean Kinney – drums, percussion

== Charts ==
Chart (1993)	Peak position
US Mainstream Rock Tracks	19
