= Last Action Hero =

1993 film directed by John McTiernan

- Theatrical release poster
- Directed by: John McTiernan
- Screenplay by: Shane Black; David Arnott
- Story by: Zak Penn; Adam Leff
- Produced by: John McTiernan; Steve Roth
- Starring: Arnold Schwarzenegger; F. Murray Abraham; Art Carney; Charles Dance; Frank McRae; Tom Noonan; Robert Prosky; Anthony Quinn; Mercedes Ruehl; Austin O'Brien
- Cinematography: Dean Semler
- Edited by: Richard A. Harris; John Wright
- Music by: Michael Kamen
- Production companies: Columbia Pictures; Steve Roth/Oak Productions
- Distributed by: Columbia Pictures
- Release dates: June 13, 1993 (Westwood); June 18, 1993 (United States)
- Running time: 131 minutes
- Country: United States
- Language: English
- Budget: $85 million
- Box office: $137.3 million

Last Action Hero is a 1993 American fantasy action comedy film directed and produced by John McTiernan and co-written by Shane Black and David Arnott. It is a satire of the action genre and associated clichés, containing several parodies of action films in the form of films within the film. The film stars Arnold Schwarzenegger as Jack Slater, a Los Angeles police detective within the Jack Slater action film franchise, while Austin O'Brien co-stars as Danny Madigan, a boy magically transported into the Slater universe, and Charles Dance as Mr. Benedict, a ruthless assassin from the Slater universe who escapes to the real world. Schwarzenegger also served as the film's executive producer and plays himself as the actor portraying Jack Slater.

Last Action Hero premiered in Westwood on June 13, 1993 and was released by Columbia Pictures on June 18, 1993 and failed to meet the studio's expectations at the box office, and was both a critical and commercial disappointment. Since its release Last Action Hero gained a cult following, with some noting it as underrated in Schwarzenegger's catalogue.

== Plot ==
10-year-old Danny Madigan lives in a crime-ridden area of New York City with his widowed mother Irene. Following his father's death, Danny takes comfort in watching action movies, especially a series featuring Los Angeles cop Jack Slater, at a condemned movie theater. Nick, the theater's owner and projectionist, gives Danny a golden ticket once owned by Harry Houdini and invites him to watch an early screening of its latest installment, Jack Slater IV.

During the film, the ticket stub transports Danny into the fictional world, interrupting Slater during a car chase. Slater takes Danny to LAPD headquarters, where Danny points out evidence of Slater's fictional world, such as the presence of numerous attractive women and a cartoon cat detective named Whiskers. Danny says that Slater's friend John Practice should not be trusted as he "killed Mozart" (since he is played by the same actor as Antonio Salieri in Amadeus). Though Slater dismisses this as Danny's imagination, Slater's supervisor, Lieutenant Dekker, assigns Danny as his partner and instructs them to investigate criminal activities related to mafia boss Tony Vivaldi.

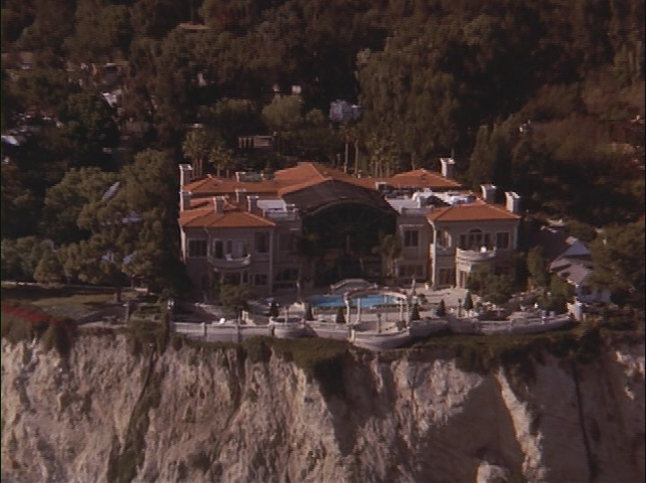
Tony Vivaldi's mansion in Malibu, California.

Danny guides Slater to Vivaldi's mansion, recognizing its location from the start of the movie. There, they meet Vivaldi's henchman, Mr. Benedict. Vivaldi and Benedict killed Slater's second cousin Frank but Slater has no evidence and is forced to leave with Danny; however, Benedict is curious as to how Danny knew and he and several hired guns follow Slater and Danny back to Slater's home. There, Slater, his daughter Whitney and Danny thwart the attack, though Benedict gets the ticket stub and discovers that it can transport him into the real world.

Slater deduces Vivaldi's plan to murder the rival mob by releasing a lethal gas. He and Danny go to stop it but are waylaid by Practice, who reveals that Danny was right: he is working for Vivaldi. Whiskers kills Practice, saving Slater and Danny, who prevent any deaths from the gas release. After Vivaldi's plan fails, Benedict kills him and uses the stub to escape into the real world, pursued by Slater and Danny.

Slater becomes despondent upon learning the truth but cheers up after spending time with Irene. Meanwhile, Benedict devises a plan to kill the actor portraying Slater in the movie, Arnold Schwarzenegger, bring other movie villains into the real world and take over. To help, Benedict brings the Ripper, the villain of Jack Slater III, to Jack Slater IV's premiere to assassinate Schwarzenegger. Slater saves Schwarzenegger and kills the Ripper. Benedict shoots Slater, critically injuring him. Danny disarms Benedict, allowing Slater to shoot Benedict in his explosive glass eye, killing him; however, the blast causes the stub to be lost. With Slater losing blood, Danny knows he can save him by returning him to the fictional world, where his injury will become a flesh wound.

The ticket stub falls in front of a theater playing The Seventh Seal, where the figure of Death emerges from the screen. Death is curious: Slater is missing from his lists of when people will die and Danny is slated to die as a grandfather. Death then suggests searching for the other half of the ticket. Danny finds it and takes Slater back into his movie, where his wounds instantly heal. Danny returns to the real world before the portal closes. A recovered Slater embraces the true nature of his reality, appreciating the differences between the two worlds. Danny and Nick bond while reminiscing on their past, while Slater drives away on the screen, waving goodbye.

== Cast ==
=== Humans ===
- Arnold Schwarzenegger in a triple role as:
  - Detective Jack Slater, a fictional LAPD officer.
  - Hamlet.
  - Arnold Schwarzenegger, a fictionalized version of himself.
- Austin O'Brien as Danny Madigan, a ten-year-old boy who is a big fan of the Slater franchise.
- Charles Dance as Mr. Benedict, Vivaldi's right-hand man, a supporting antagonist in Jack Slater IV who becomes the film's hidden main antagonist.
- Robert Prosky as Nick, a projectionist.
- Tom Noonan as the Ripper, the main antagonist of Jack Slater III. Noonan also appears as himself at the Jack Slater IV premiere.
- Frank McRae as Lieutenant Dekker, Slater's immediate and ill-tempered supervisor, who is always screaming at him.
- Anthony Quinn as Tony Vivaldi, the main antagonist of Jack Slater IV until Danny's interference changes events. A running gag with him is his frequent butchering of common phrases.
- Bridgette Wilson as Whitney Slater, Jack's daughter. Wilson also plays Meredith Caprice, the actress who plays Whitney in the Slater films
- F. Murray Abraham as John Practice, Jack's friend, revealed to be a traitor. Danny says not to trust him, saying he killed Mozart, referring to Abraham's Academy Award winning role as Antonio Salieri in Amadeus.
- Mercedes Ruehl as Irene Madigan, Danny's mother
- Art Carney as Frank Slater, Jack's second cousin. This was Carney's final film role.
- Professor Toru Tanaka as "Tough Asian Man", Vivaldi and Benedict's bodyguard.
- Ryan Todd as Andrew Slater, Jack's son, who was killed in Jack Slater III by the Ripper.
- Jeffrey Braer as Skeezy
- Bobbie Brown as Video Babe

=== Cameo appearances ===
- Franco Columbu's name appears during the opening credits as director of Jack Slater IV. Columbu was a fellow bodybuilder and a close friend of Schwarzenegger.
- Tina Turner as the mayor of Los Angeles at the climax of Jack Slater III.
- Sharon Stone and Robert Patrick appear outside the front door of LAPD as Catherine Tramell (from Basic Instinct) and the T-1000 (from Terminator 2: Judgment Day), respectively. Stone and Patrick had earlier co-starred with Schwarzenegger in Total Recall and Terminator 2, respectively.
- Mike Muscat as a cop in the LAPD headquarters. Muscat previously appeared with Schwarzenegger as Moshier in Terminator 2: Judgment Day and was also Edward Furlong's acting coach for the same film.
- Veteran stuntmen Al Leong, Henry Kingi and Sven-Ole Thorsen as Vivaldi's henchmen in the car chase.
- Sylvester Stallone as the Terminator on a poster promoting Terminator 2: Judgment Day. This references the Schwarzenegger–Stallone rivalry.
- Angie Everhart as a video store clerk
- During the premiere of Jack Slater IV in the real world, several celebrities appear as themselves. These include Schwarzenegger's then-wife Maria Shriver, Little Richard, Entertainment Tonight host Leeza Gibbons, Jim Belushi (who starred with Schwarzenegger in Red Heat and later Jingle All the Way), Timothy Dalton, Damon Wayans, Chevy Chase, Melvin Van Peebles, Karen Duffy, entertainment reporter Chris Connelly and Jean-Claude Van Damme (who worked with John McTiernan on the Schwarzenegger film Predator as the original Predator before dropping out and later co-starred with Schwarzenegger in The Expendables 2).
- As Jack and Danny enter the movie theater to find Arnold Schwarzenegger, MC Hammer asks Slater about a deal to do the Jack Slater V soundtrack.
- Michael V. Gazzo as crime boss Torelli
- Wilson Phillips as themselves
- Ian McKellen as Death, emerging via the ticket stub's magic from Ingmar Bergman's film The Seventh Seal (in which the role was originally played by Bengt Ekerot).
- Colleen Camp as Officer Ratcliff, the cop who retaliates when harassed by Whiskers in the police station.
- Joan Plowright as the English teacher who shows her class the 1948 film adaptation of Hamlet, which starred and was directed by Plowright's husband Laurence Olivier.
- Danny DeVito (uncredited) as Whiskers, the cartoon cat police detective. DeVito had earlier co-starred with Schwarzenegger in Twins and would do so again in Junior.
- Black and white digitization of Humphrey Bogart as one of the detectives in the police station.

== Production ==
=== Development and writing ===
Last Action Hero was an original screenplay by Zak Penn and Adam Leff, meant to parody typical action-film screenplays of writers such as Shane Black. Penn himself noted that the studio ironically then had Black rewrite the script. The original screenplay differs heavily from the finished film and is widely available to read online. Although it was still a parody of Hollywood action films, it was set almost entirely in the film world and focused largely on the futile cycle of violence displayed by the hero and the effect it had on people around him. Due to the radical changes, Penn and Leff were eventually credited with the story of the film, but not the screenplay. Several script doctors did uncredited work on the script, including Carrie Fisher, Larry Ferguson and William Goldman. Penn and Leff disliked various parts of the final film, including the idea of a magic golden ticket. In their draft, the story would not explain how Danny Madigan got transported into the film world.

John McTiernan originally turned down the offer to direct the film, Robert Zemeckis was under consideration to direct but McTiernan later changed his mind. Arnold Schwarzenegger received a salary of $15 million for his role as Jack Slater in the film. Some scenes were filmed in a dome adjacent to the RMS Queen Mary in Long Beach, California. The exterior of the film's Pandora Theater was the Empire Theater on 42nd Street in New York. The interiors were filmed at the Orpheum Theatre in Los Angeles.

== Music ==
Last Action Hero: Music from the Original Motion Picture

Soundtrack album by various artists
- Released: June 8, 1993
- Genres: Heavy metal; alternative metal; grunge; alternative rock; hard rock
- Length: 54:19
- Label: Columbia Records
- Producer: Various Artists

Singles from Last Action Hero: Music from the Original Motion Picture
- 1. "Big Gun" Released: May 24, 1993; 2. "Real World" Released: May 31, 1993; 3. "What the Hell Have I" Released: June 7, 1993; 4. "Angry Again" Released: June 14, 1993; 5. "Two Steps Behind" Released: August 24, 1993; 6. "Dream On (Live)" Released: June 8, 1993

Professional ratings
Review scores
| Source | Rating |
|---|---|
| AllMusic | link |
| Philadelphia Inquirer | 2.5/4 stars |

The film was scored by composer Michael Kamen and peaked at No. 7 on the Billboard 200 chart. The album, which was positively received by active rock radio outlets, was certified platinum on August 24, 1993.

| No. | Title | Performed by | Length |
|---|---|---|---|
| 1. | "Big Gun" | AC/DC | 4:24 |
| 2. | "What the Hell Have I" | Alice in Chains | 3:58 |
| 3. | "Angry Again" | Megadeth | 3:47 |
| 4. | "Real World" | Queensrÿche | 4:21 |
| 5. | "Two Steps Behind" | Def Leppard | 4:19 |
| 6. | "Poison My Eyes" | Anthrax | 7:04 |
| 7. | "Dream On (Live)" | Aerosmith | 5:42 |
| 8. | "A Little Bitter" | Alice in Chains | 3:53 |
| 9. | "Cock the Hammer" | Cypress Hill | 4:11 |
| 10. | "Swim" | Fishbone | 4:13 |
| 11. | "Last Action Hero" | Tesla | 5:44 |
| 12. | "Jack and the Ripper" | Michael Kamen and the Los Angeles Rock And Roll Ensemble featuring Buckethead | 3:43 |
| Total length: | | | 54:19 |

=== Certifications ===
| Region | Certification | Certified units/sales |
|---|---|---|
| Canada (Music Canada) | Platinum | 100,000^{^} |
| United States (RIAA) | Platinum | 1,000,000^{^} |
^{^} Shipments figures based on certification alone.

== Release ==
=== Theatrical ===
At the time of its release, the film was billed as "the next great summer action movie" and many movie insiders predicted it would be a huge blockbuster, especially following the success of Schwarzenegger's previous film Terminator 2: Judgment Day. The film premiered in Westwood, Los Angeles on June 13, 1993 and entered general release in the United States five days later. It was the first film to have the 1993-present Columbia Pictures logo.

The film was rated PG-13 in the United States, which is also the subject of a gag in the film. Although the distributors wanted a 12 rating from the British Board of Film Classification (BBFC), Last Action Hero was instead rated 15, with the BBFC later noting that, despite its "ironic perspective", the film contained "far too much cynical violence for the junior categories". In 2021, a version with running commentary was rated 12.

=== Home media ===
Last Action Hero was released on VHS and LaserDisc on January 26, 1994 and on DVD on October 7, 1997. On February 3, 2009, Last Action Hero was reissued on DVD by Sony Pictures Home Entertainment in a double-feature set with the 1986 film Iron Eagle. It was released on the high-definition Blu-ray disc format on January 12, 2010. The film double-featured with Hudson Hawk on Blu-ray and released by Umbrella Entertainment on September 4, 2019 in Australia only. An Ultra HD Blu-ray restored version was released on May 18, 2021 and featured a director's commentary track, deleted scenes, an alternative ending and the original theatrical trailer, all in 4K. The film was re-released with Cliffhanger in a 2-Movie Collection Blu-ray pack on November 2, 2021.

== Reception ==
=== Box office ===
The film grossed approximately $1.1 million in previews on the evening of Thursday, June 17, 1993 and opened at number two at the US box office, behind Jurassic Park's second weekend, grossing $15,338,241 in its opening weekend, from 2,306 theaters, averaging $6,651 per theater. It ended its run with $50,016,394 in the United States and Canada. The film was released in the United Kingdom on July 30, 1993 on 266 screens and again opened at number two behind Jurassic Park (on 435 screens) with a gross of $1.34 million for the weekend. In France it opened at number one with a gross of 21 million French franc ($3.6 million) in its opening week. It grossed $87,202,095 overseas, for a worldwide total of $137,298,489. In an episode of the A&E series Biography, Schwarzenegger said that the film could have done better if not for bad timing, since it came out a week after Jurassic Park which went on to break box-office records as one of the top-grossing films of all time.

Schwarzenegger states that he tried to persuade his coproducers to postpone the film's June 18 release in the United States by four weeks but they turned a deaf ear on the grounds that the film would have lost millions of dollars in revenue for every weekend of the summer it ended up missing, also fearing that delaying the release would create negative publicity. He told the authors of Hit and Run that while everyone involved with the production had given their best effort, their attempt to appeal to both action and comedy fans resulted in a film that appealed to neither audience and ultimately succumbed to heavy competition.

=== Critical response ===
Last Action Hero received mixed reviews from critics. On Rotten Tomatoes, the film has an approval rating of 42% based on 55 reviews. The site's critical consensus reads, "Last Action Hero has most of the right ingredients for a big-budget action spoof, but its scattershot tone and uneven structure only add up to a confused, chaotic mess." On Metacritic, the film has a weighted average score of 44 out of 100 based on 19 critics, indicating "mixed or average" reviews. Audiences polled by CinemaScore gave the film an average grade of "C+" on an A+ to F scale.

Roger Ebert gave the film 2.5 stars out of 4, writing that despite some entertaining moments, Last Action Hero "plays more like a bright idea than like a movie that was thought through. It doesn't evoke the mystery of the barrier between audience and screen the way Woody Allen did in The Purple Rose of Cairo, and a lot of the time it simply seems to be standing around commenting on itself." Vincent Canby likened the film to "a two-hour Saturday Night Live sketch" and called it "something of a mess, but a frequently enjoyable one".Owen Gleiberman of Entertainment Weekly wrote: "Last Action Hero makes such a strenuous show of winking at the audience (and itself) that it seems to be celebrating nothing so much as its own awfulness. In a sense, the movie's incipient commercial failure completes it aesthetically." Variety called it "a joyless, soulless machine of a movie, an $80 million-plus mishmash of fantasy, industry in-jokes, self-referential parody, film-buff gags and too-big action set-pieces." Halliwell's Film Guide described it as "a film that tries to have it both ways, simultaneously mocking and celebrating the conventions of action movies, which leaves audiences, as well as the actors and director, in a state of bewildered confusion". John Ferguson of Radio Times was more positive, awarding it four stars out of five and stating, "An Arnold Schwarzenegger backlash had been on the cards for some time and when this extravaganza was released the knives were well and truly out. It was actually all a little unfair, because this is a smart, funny blockbuster [...] Schwarzenegger has rarely been better and he is backed up by a never-ending stream of star names in cameo roles [...] And, although McTiernan has fun spoofing the conventions of the action genre, he still manages to slip in some spectacular set pieces."

=== Legacy ===
About the film's failure and critical response, John McTiernan said:

Initially, it was a wonderful Cinderella story with a nine-year-old boy. We had a pretty good script by Bill Goldman, charming. And this ludicrous hype machine got hold of it, and it got buried under bullshit. It was so overwhelmed with baggage. And then it was whipped out unedited, practically assembled right out of the camera. It was in the theater five or six weeks after I finished shooting. It was kamikaze, stupid, no good reason for it. And then to open the week after Jurassic Park—God! To get to the depth of bad judgment involved in that, you'd need a snorkel.

Later Schwarzenegger blamed the film's poor performance on bad press and the election of Democratic president Bill Clinton, which he said influenced audiences to see 1980s action film stars as lowbrow. In 2017, he said streaming services gave the film its chance to reach new audiences unencumbered by the bad press. In Netflix's three-part 2023 docuseries Arnold, Schwarzenegger recalled how the movie's failure affected him. "When Last Action Hero came out I had reached my peak after Terminator 2, having the most successful movie of the year worldwide, I cannot tell you how upset that I was [about the negative Last Action Hero reviews]. It hurts you. It hurts your feelings. It's embarrassing. I didn't want to see anyone for a week, but you keep plodding along." Director James Cameron said that he had called Schwarzenegger the weekend after Last Action Hero opened and recalled that it was the only time he's "ever heard him down." Cameron continued, "He took it as a deep blow to his brand. I think it really shook him." Shane Black was very critical of the movie: "It was a mess. There was a movie in there, struggling to emerge, which would have pleased me. But what they'd made was a jarring, random collection of scenes."

Years after its release, the film was the subject of a scathing chapter called "How They Built the Bomb", in the Nancy Griffin and Kim Masters book Hit and Run which detailed the misadventures at Sony Pictures in the early to mid-1990s. The book detailed how Arnold Schwarzenegger selected Last Action Hero as his next project in a close race against another Sony property, a comedy about a modern Tooth Fairy entitled Sweet Tooth by prominent screenwriting team Lowell Ganz and Babaloo Mandel, eventually rewritten for Dwayne Johnson as Tooth Fairy in 2010. Universal moved Jurassic Park to June 11, 1993, well after Sony had decided on a June 18 release date for Last Action Hero. The movie was reportedly the first to have an advertisement placed on a space-going rocket, which cost an additional $500,000. A rough cut screened in May 1993 was reviewed negatively; Sony destroyed the review cards, and the film's word-of-mouth would prove to be catastrophic, earning a "C+" CinemaScore grade. The shooting and editing schedules were so demanding and so close to the June 18 release date that after the movie's release, a source close to the film said that they "shouldn't have had [Gene] Siskel and [Roger] Ebert telling us the movie is 10 minutes too long". With Jurassic Park continuing to top the box office, Last Action Hero dropped 47% on its second weekend, dropping to fourth behind two newcomers: Sleepless in Seattle from Sony subsidiary TriStar Pictures, and Dennis the Menace. Last Action Hero was the first film to be released using Sony Dynamic Digital Sound. Still, only a few theaters were set up for the new format, and many of those experienced technical problems. Insiders at Paramount reportedly referred to it as "Still Doesn't Do Shit". The final declared financial loss for the film was $26 million.

In the years since the release of Last Action Hero, the film has developed a strong cult following. Schwarzenegger singled out that movie as his most underrated: "Last Action Hero was great – it wasn't fantastic, but it was underrated. Now, more and more people are seeing it and saying, "I love this movie." I'm getting the residual checks, so I know it's true. It made money – that's always an important thing for me. Because it's show business, right?" Later, Charles Dance said: "I think they just didn't time the release very well. It came out more or less at the same time as something very big", referring to Jurassic Park. "But it was fun to do." He also praised Schwarzenegger: "Arnold is a very smart man, oh yes. Very definitely. And very funny, and very aware."

=== Accolades ===
The film was nominated for six Golden Raspberry Awards: Worst Picture, Worst Director (McTiernan), Worst Actor (Schwarzenegger), Worst Screenplay, Worst New Star (Austin O'Brien) and Worst Original Song ("Big Gun"), but it did not win any at the 14th Golden Raspberry Awards. At the 1993 Stinkers Bad Movie Awards, the film received two nominations without wins: Worst Picture and Worst Actor (Schwarzenegger). The film was also nominated for seven Saturn Awards for Best Fantasy Film, Best Actor, Best Director, Best Writing, Best Performance by a Young Actor, Best Costume Design and Best Special Effects, again winning nothing at the 20th Saturn Awards.

== Video games ==
A video game based on the film was released in 1993 and 1994 on video game consoles. A themed-pinball machine by Data East was included and released on The Pinball Arcade and its spin-off Stern Pinball Arcade in 2016.

== Potential sequel ==
In October 2019, Schwarzenegger said that he was open to starring in sequels to Last Action Hero and True Lies (1994) if there was sufficient fan interest.

== See also ==
- List of American films of 1993
- Story within a story
- List of 8 channel SDDS films
- List of films featuring fictional films
