= Sony Dynamic Digital Sound =

Cinema sound system

- Abbreviation: SDDS
- Formation: April 2, 1992; 34 years ago
- Type: Cinema sound
- Location: Japan
- Owner: Sony
- Website: www.sdds.com

Sony Dynamic Digital Sound (Japanese: ソニー・ダイナミック・デジタル・サウンド, Hepburn: Sonī Dainamikku Dejitaru Saundo; SDDS) is a cinema sound system developed by Sony, in which compressed digital sound information is recorded on both outer edges of the 35mm film release print. The system supports up to eight independent channels of sound: five front channels, two surround channels and a single sub-bass channel. The eight channel arrangement is similar to large format film magnetic sound formats such as Cinerama and Cinemiracle. The five front channels are useful for very large cinema auditoriums where the angular distance between center and left/right channels may be considerable. SDDS decoders provide the ability to downmix to fewer channels if required.

== History ==
Original logo, used on the first several SDDS releases between April 1992 and June of 2003

Although originally slated to premiere with 1991's Hook, the SDDS project was delayed and instead premiered on April 2, 1992. Since then, over 2000 movies have been mixed and remastered in Sony Dynamic Digital Sound, and as early as 1999 over 6,750 movie theaters were equipped with SDDS.

The code name for the SDDS project was "Green Lantern", taken from the name of the comic book hero and the old term of "magic lantern" used to describe the original projected pictures in the late 19th century. Green came to mind because the key to imprinting the 8 micrometre data bits was to use a green laser.

Initial development efforts were conducted for Sony's Columbia Pictures Sound Department under contract with Semetex Corp. of Torrance, California. At Semetex, the SDDS Designer and Chief Architect was Jaye Waas and the Chief Optical Engineer was Mark Waring. By contract, the patent rights were awarded to Sony who chose to list names of Sony individuals who supported the work effort.

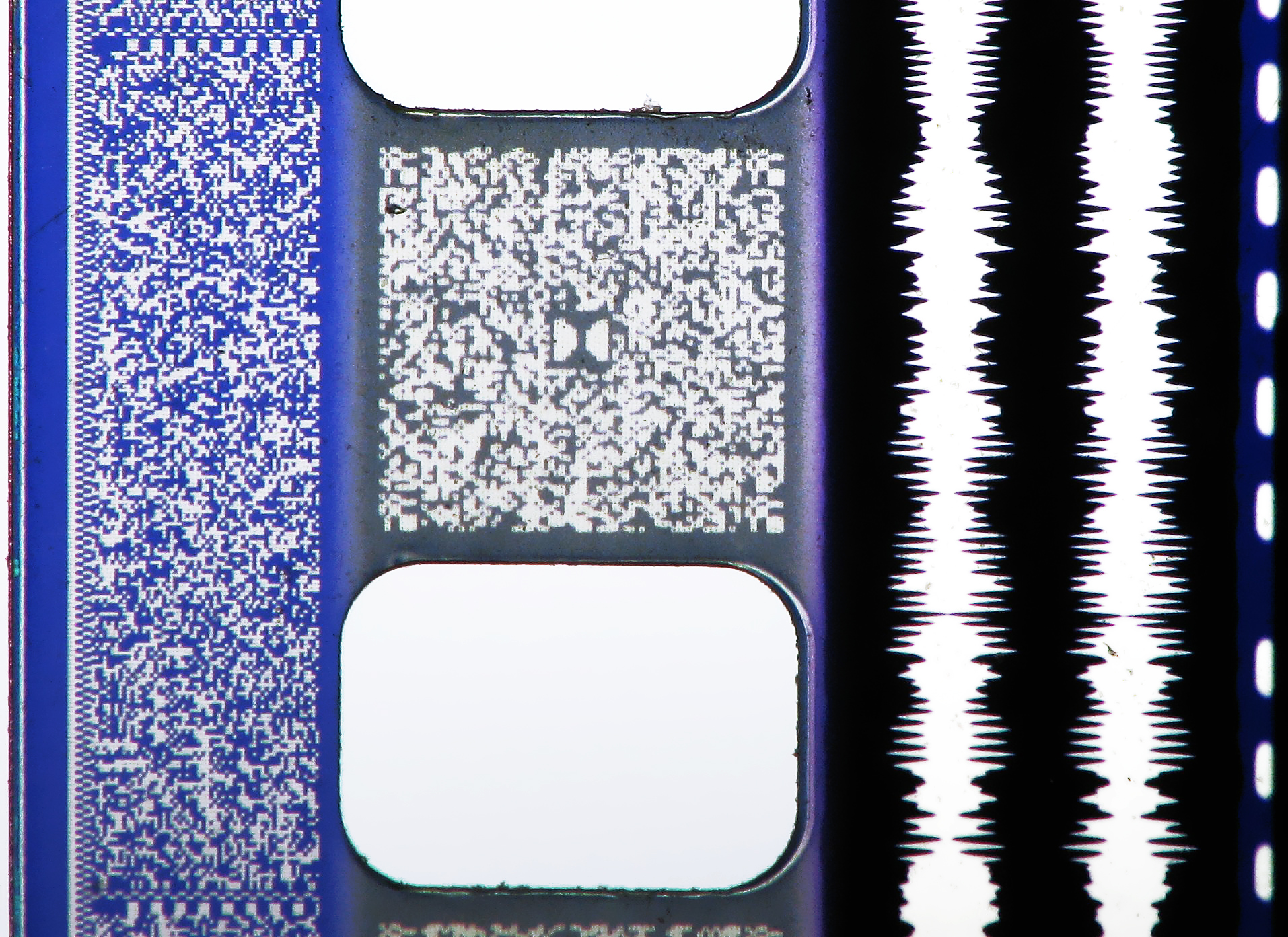
A photo of a 35 mm film print featuring all four audio formats (or "quad track") - from left to right: SDDS (blue area to the left of the sprocket holes), Dolby Digital (grey area between the sprocket holes labelled with the Dolby "Double-D" logo in the middle), analog optical sound (the two white lines to the right of the sprocket holes), and the DTS time code (the dashed line to the far right.)

The Semetex prototype design actually had the eight channels of uncompressed data placed into three locations: data bordering both sides of the analog sound track and additional data tracks bordering the opposite edge of the picture frame. These locations were chosen to ensure the data were not placed into the sprocket perforation area of the film to prevent the known wear and degradation that occurs in the perforation area (due to the mechanical film sprockets) from degrading the data. Clocking and guide tracks were placed on each side of the film near the sprockets. The prototype sound camera imprinted the Digital audio and Analog audio "at speed". A companion digital reader was designed to form a complete system. After Sony received the prototype they enlarged the data bits from the original 8 micron (micrometer) size and moved the data locations; the eight digital audio channels are now recorded on (and recovered from) the edges of the film. As Sony engineers became more actively involved in the project, the design of the SDDS format evolved toward a more robust implementation, including the use of 5:1 ATRAC data compression, extensive error detection and correction, and most critically redundancy. The redundancy allows data to be recovered substantially intact even in the presence of a film splice (common for repairing damaged film). The data bit size on film was enlarged from 8 micron (micrometer) to 24 micrometers square, and Semetex's Green Laser system, which could produce the 8 micrometer square-shaped data bits, for the sound camera was replaced with simpler Sony LED/fiber optic assemblies which limited resolving to 24 micrometers square shape. Using data compression allowed 24 micrometers square data bits to fit within the newly allocated areas.

The SDDS development at Semetex took just 11 months from concept to working sound camera.

When it came time for deployment, since Sony also owned the Sony Theaters chain (later sold to Loews Theaters), it was able to use SDDS in its own theaters. And via its Columbia/TriStar Studios arm, it was able to use SDDS as the exclusive digital soundtrack on its titles. In addition, in the early days of the "megaplex explosion", Sony struck a deal with AMC Theatres in 1994 to include SDDS in all of their new auditoriums.

SDDS was consistently the least popular of the three competing digital sound formats, the other two being Spectral Recording Dolby Stereo Digital and DTS. Along with being the most expensive to install (and the last to arrive), there were major reliability issues with SDDS due to the change from the prototype sound track placement to the very edges of the film stock where the film is subject to damage. SDDS tracks are prone to damage as are some other digital formats. With all the digital sound formats: any failure of the digital track could result in a "drop-out" of the digital format and possibly a switch to analog sound. Additionally a drop-out resulting in a switch to Analog (Analogue) may produce a slight loss of fidelity and high and low-ends, although it is more difficult to tell in a properly calibrated auditorium.

SDDS's much-touted eight track playback capability never quite caught on, as it required that a separate eight channel sound mix be created in addition to the six channel mix that is needed for SRD and DTS, an additional expense for the studios. Out of the 1,400 plus films mixed in SDDS, only 97 of them to date have been mixed to support the full 8 channels, most of them Sony (Via Sony Pictures/Columbia/TriStar) releases. Because of the added installation expense, the majority of SDDS installations are 6 channel (5.1) installations, as opposed to 8 channel (7.1) installations.

See also List of 8 channel SDDS films.

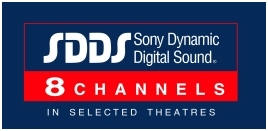
SDDS 8-Channels; this logo is used when all 8 channels are used as opposed to the usual six.

While most major studios eventually began putting SDDS tracks on their releases, most independent films only came with Dolby Digital tracks, leaving many SDDS-equipped, or DTS theaters playing analog sound in otherwise state-of-the-art auditoriums. A few titles released under the Kidtoon Films program used SDDS tracks. As Dolby Digital (and to a lesser degree, DTS) began to emerge as the clear winner in the digital sound battle, Sony Cinema Products quit manufacturing SDDS encoders and decoders, although it will continue supporting equipment that is still deployed in the field.

Out of the three competing formats, SDDS was the only format not to have a corresponding home-theater version, and Sony ceased production of new units in the early 2000s.

== Technical ==
SDDS channel arrangement with 5 front channels, 2 surround channels and a subwoofer channel or "5/2.1".

- Original format used: 8 micron (micrometre) square data bits, 16 bit per audio channel, 8 audio channels, 2 clock tracks, 2 guide tracks for alignment with the film.
- Final format used: 24 micrometre square data bits.

The format carries up to 8 channels of Dynamic Digital Sound (DDS) encoded using Sony's ATRAC codec with a compression ratio of about 5:1 and a sampling rate of 44.1 kHz. The channels are:

- 5 screen channels
  - Left
  - Left center
  - Center
  - Right center
  - Right
- 2 surround channels
  - Left surround
  - Right surround
- Subwoofer channel

Additionally there are 4 backup channels encoded – in case of damage to one side of the film or the other. These are:

- Center
- Subwoofer
- Left + left center
- Right + right center

This gives a total of 12 channels, for which the total bitrate of 2.2 megabits per second. This is more than the maximum 1.536 megabits per second DTS format bitrate, and far greater than the cinema Dolby Digital bitrate of 320 kilobits (0.32 megabits) per second.

For additional data reliability the two sides of the film are separated by 17 frames and half, so a single splice or series of missing frames will not result in a total loss of data.

== Reader ==
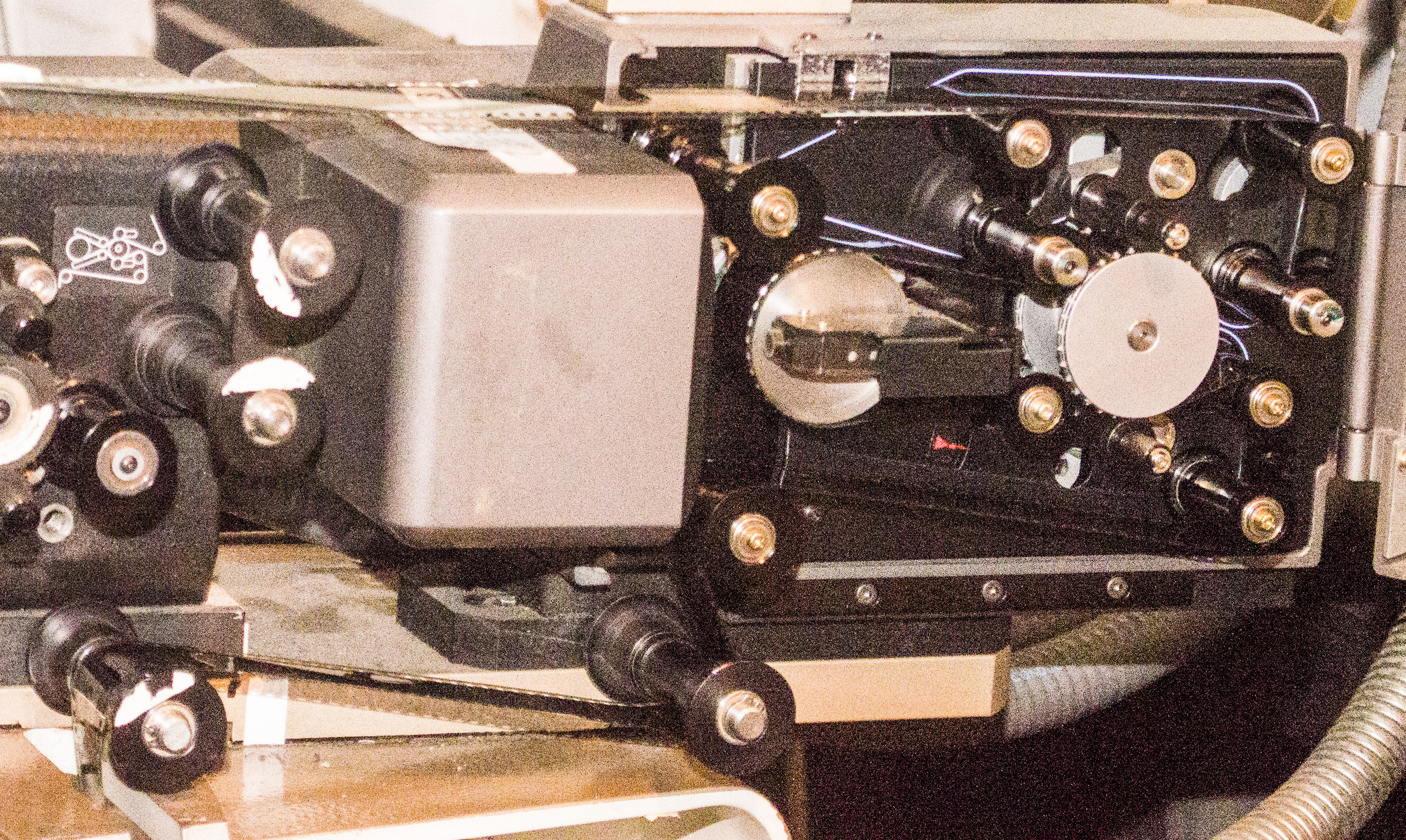
A Sony DFP-R2000 SDDS reader mounted on a Norelco AAII projector, with film threaded.

The SDDS reader is mounted on top of a 35mm projector. The film is threaded through the reader before it passes through the picture aperture. As the film runs, red LEDs are used to illuminate the SDDS soundtrack. CCDs (Charge-Coupled Devices) read the SDDS data and convert the stream of dots on the film into digital information. This information is pre-processed in the reader and passed on to the SDDS decoder.

== Decoder ==
The SDDS decoder is installed in the sound equipment rack. The decoder receives the information from the reader and translates it into audio signals routed to the cinema's power amplifiers. The decoder is responsible for a series of processes that must be performed before the audio is recovered. Next, errors caused by scratches or damage to the film are corrected using redundant error recovery data. Since SDDS is read at the top of the projector, the data is delayed slightly to restore synchronization with the picture. And finally, adjustments in tonal balance and playback level are made to match the specific auditorium's sound system and acoustics. SDDS is designed to process sound entirely in the digital domain, bypassing any existing analog processor, preserving clarity and providing full dynamic range.
