= Big Gun =

1993 single by AC/DC

Single by AC/DC

from the album Last Action Hero: Music from the Original Motion Picture
- B-side: "Back in Black" (live)
- Released: 24 May 1993
- Length: 4:24
- Label: ATCO
- Songwriters: Angus Young; Malcolm Young
- Producer: Rick Rubin

AC/DC singles chronology
"Dirty Deeds Done Dirt Cheap" (live) (1992)	"Big Gun" (1993)	"Hard as a Rock" (1995)

Music video
- "Big Gun" on YouTube

"Big Gun" is a song by the Australian hard rock band AC/DC. It was released as a single in May 1993, by Atco Records, from the soundtrack to the Arnold Schwarzenegger helmed action movie Last Action Hero. The song was later released on the box set Backtracks in November 2009.

It became the band's first No. 1 on the US Billboard Album Rock Tracks chart in 1993. The accompanying music video was directed by David Mallet. At the APRA Music Awards of 1995, the song won Most Performed Australian Work Overseas. AC/DC has played the song live only once during 1996 rehearsals but never at an official show.

== Release ==
As well as its worldwide release on the Last Action Hero soundtrack, the song was on iTunes with the rest of the soundtrack, with this fact making it, for a time, the only song by AC/DC on iTunes. It was later removed from iTunes along with "Two Steps Behind" by Def Leppard. The song returned to iTunes along with AC/DC's entire catalogue, although it still is not available to purchase as a track on the Last Action Hero soundtrack. Instead it can be purchased as a song from AC/DC's 2009 rarities boxset, Backtracks.

== Critical reception ==
Larry Flick from Billboard magazine complimented "Big Gun" as a "fresh recording", remarking that here, producer Rick Rubin "gives the band's sound a dense, radio-friendly tone without sacrificing its guitar attack or Brian Johnson well-weathered howl. Album-rockers, be alert." Andy Martin from Music Week gave the song a score of four out of five, naming it Pick of the Week in the category of Rock. He stated that "this cannot fail to be a winner" and "a hit is assured."

Sam Wood from Philadelphia Inquirer felt that with "Big Gun", "testosterone terrors AC/DC [have] come up with the strongest single since the group's "For Those About to Rock (We Salute You)" - which should come as little surprise, because it's a virtual rewrite of the band's 1981 hit."

== Music video ==
The music video for "Big Gun" was directed by British director David Mallet and released on 24 May 1993, the same day the single was serviced to US album rock radio. It begins with Schwarzenegger, as his film-within-a-film character, Jack Slater, breaking an entrance door to an AC/DC concert. As he walks around the crowd and the stage, observing each band member, Angus kicks his cap towards him.

When Schwarzenegger puts on the cap, his clothes morph into Angus' trademark school uniform costume and signature Gibson SG. He then starts imitating Angus' on-stage antics throughout the video, including a scene in which Angus Young climbs up on Schwarzenegger's back and rides around the stage perched on his shoulders while continuing to play his guitar chords. The video features a young Shavo Odadjian, the future bassist for the Armenian-American alternative metal band System of a Down.

The video was similar to the one for "You Could Be Mine" released to promote Terminator 2: Judgment Day, where Schwarzenegger as the T-800 interacted with Guns N' Roses.

The video was released on Family Jewels Disc 3, part of the 2009 box set Backtracks. It was not released on the original Family Jewels, because it contains scenes from the movie and therefore had licensing issues.

== Track listing ==
- CD maxi-single (US)
1. "Big Gun" (Angus Young, Malcolm Young) – 4:25
2. "For Those About to Rock (We Salute You)" (Live in Moscow) (Brian Johnson, Young, Young) – 6:42
3. "Back in Black" (Live in Moscow) (Johnson, Young, Young) – 4:26
- CD maxi-single (UK)
1. "Big Gun" (Young, Young) – 4:25
2. "For Those About to Rock (We Salute You)" (Live in Moscow) (Johnson, Young, Young) – 6:42
3. "Shoot to Thrill" (Live at Donington) (Johnson, Young, Young) – 5:45

== Personnel ==
- Brian Johnson – lead vocals
- Angus Young – lead guitar
- Malcolm Young – rhythm guitar, backing vocals
- Cliff Williams – bass guitar, backing vocals
- Chris Slade – drums

This was the last song to feature drummer Chris Slade, before he left AC/DC a year later so that Phil Rudd could return to the band.

== Charts ==
=== Weekly charts ===
Weekly chart performance for "Big Gun"
Chart (1993)	Peak position
Australia (ARIA)	19
Austria (Ö3 Austria Top 40)	23
Belgium (Ultratop 50 Wallonia)	35
Canada Retail Singles (The Record)	5
Europe (Eurochart Hot 100)	17
Finland (Suomen virallinen lista)	4
France (SNEP)	14
Germany (GfK)	20
Netherlands (Dutch Top 40)	19
Netherlands (Single Top 100)	18
New Zealand (Recorded Music NZ)	3
Norway (VG-lista)	8
Sweden (Sverigetopplistan)	11
Switzerland (Schweizer Hitparade)	5
UK Singles (Official Charts)	23
UK Airplay (ERA)	70
US Billboard Hot 100	65
US Mainstream Rock (Billboard)	1
US Cash Box Top 100	59

=== Year-end charts ===
Year-end chart performance for "Big Gun"
Chart (1993)	Position
Australia (ARIA)	79
Germany (Media Control)	87
New Zealand (RIANZ)	29
Sweden (Topplistan)	83
US Album Rock Tracks (Billboard)	8

== Release history ==
Release dates and formats for "Big Gun"
Region	Date	Format(s)	Label(s)	Ref.
United States	24 May 1993	Album rock radio	ATCO	
United Kingdom	28 June 1993	7-inch vinyl; 12-inch vinyl; CD; cassette	ATCO	
