= Of Mice and Men (song) =

2004 single by Megadeth

Single by Megadeth

from the album The System Has Failed
- Released: 2004
- Recorded: 2004
- Genre: Heavy metal
- Length: 4:05
- Label: Sanctuary
- Songwriter: Dave Mustaine
- Producers: Jeff Balding; Dave Mustaine

Megadeth singles chronology
"Blackmail the Universe" (2004)	"Of Mice and Men" (2004)	"The Scorpion" (2005)

Music video
- "Of Mice and Men" on YouTube

"Of Mice and Men" is a 2004 song by American heavy metal band Megadeth, written by Dave Mustaine. It was the second single from their 2004 album The System Has Failed, which was released on September 14, 2004.

== Music video ==
A music video was made for the song, directed by Michael J. Sarna and released on July 2005. The music video begins with Dave Mustaine singing in profile and later in bed. He performs in front of the band in a darkened room surrounded by headbanging people. This is the music video that only features James MacDonough on bass and also feature then-guitarist Glen Drover and then-drummer Shawn Drover respectively, making their debuts with the band.

== Charts ==
Chart (2005)	Peak position
US Mainstream Rock (Billboard)	39

== Personnel ==
Personnel taken from The System Has Failed liner notes

Megadeth

- Dave Mustaine – lead vocals, lead and rhythm guitars (fifth solo)
- Chris Poland – lead guitar (all solos except fifth)
- Jimmie Lee Sloas – bass guitar
- Vinnie Colaiuta – drums

Additional musicians

- Eric Darken – percussion
- Tim Akers – keyboards
- Chris Rodriguez – backing vocals
