= List of Aerosmith concert tours =

The following is a listing of concert tours by American hard rock band Aerosmith, along with notable individual concert performances. Over 50 years, the band has performed over 2,000 concerts across 51 countries.

== Concert tours ==
Year	Title	Notes	Dates
1970–72	Club Days	On November 6, 1970, Aerosmith performed their first concert at Nipmuc Regional High School (Now Miscoe Hill Middle School, Nipmuc High School was rebuilt in Upton) in Mendon, Massachusetts. From 1970 to 1972, the band played a series of gigs at colleges, high schools, junior high schools, clubs, ballrooms, and other small venues throughout New England and New York. On 1971 August 24 in Vermont, at The Savage Beast, the band had its first show with Brad Whitford.	
1973	Aerosmith Tour	The band continued to play smaller venues, primarily theaters, mostly in New England. In October, the band garnered more nationwide exposure, when they opened for Mott the Hoople.	
1974	Get Your Wings Tour	Began March 9, 1974. In addition to performing in their home base of the Northeastern United States, the band began to venture out into other parts of the United States, particularly the Midwest and the South, and opened for other bands in larger arena shows. On July 9, Steven Tyler spent the night in jail for swearing on stage.	
1975	Toys in the Attic Tour	Began March 25, 1975; the band toured North America, and went to the Western U.S. for the first time. The band began to headline many of their own shows.	
1976–77	Rocks Tour	Beginning April 17, 1976, it was the band's first major headlining tour. The band played some of the largest stadiums in the U.S., including the Silverdome, the Kingdome, Three Rivers Stadium, Angels Stadium, Sun Devil Stadium, and Comiskey Park. In the fall of 1976, Aerosmith toured Europe for the first time, supported by Phoenix. In January–February 1977, the band toured Japan for the first time.	86
1977–78	Aerosmith Express Tour	Beginning June 21, 1977, it was a very successful and grueling tour for the band. Opening acts included Point Blank, AC/DC, Mahogany Rush, Nazareth, and Ted Nugent. Most of the recordings on Live! Bootleg were culled from this tour. Aerosmith headlined the Texxas Jam '78 Festival on July 1, 1978, which was later released on video in 1989. Aerosmith also headlined Cal Jam II in Ontario, CA and the Day on the Green Festival in Oakland, CA. On October 10, 1977, Steven Tyler and Joe Perry were walking back on stage and were injured by a cherry bomb thrown on stage in Philadelphia.	82
1978	Live! Bootleg Tour	This tour saw the band play arenas across North America in the fall of 1978. Opening acts included Golden Earring. The band bailed out 53 fans arrested for smoking pot at a show in Fort Wayne, Indiana on October 3, 1978. On November 25, 1978, Steven Tyler was hit by a glass bottle in Philadelphia, which caused the band to cancel the show.	43
1979–80	Night in the Ruts Tour	In April and July 1979, the band played major festivals in Los Angeles, Orlando, Toronto, Oakland, and Cleveland. Guitarist Joe Perry quit the band at the Cleveland show, on July 28, 1979. After the album was released, the band embarked on a North American tour in the winter of 1979–80, the first tour to include Perry's replacement, Jimmy Crespo.	36
1982–84	Rock in a Hard Place Tour	This tour featured Jimmy Crespo and Rick Dufay on guitars, after Brad Whitford left the band. The tour began in November 1982 and continued through 1983, with the last stop in Providence on February 17, 1984.	72
1984	Back in the Saddle Tour	The band's reunion tour, after Joe Perry and Brad Whitford rejoined the band. Tour began June 22, 1984.	63
1985–86	Done with Mirrors Tour	The tour began August 23, 1985 in support of the original lineup's first album in six years.	101
1987–88	Permanent Vacation Tour	Began October 16, 1987, lasting until September 1988. The band's first tour since completing drug rehabilitation. Guns N' Roses opened for much of the tour.	146
1989–90	Pump Tour	Began October 18, 1989. A major world tour for the band, it saw them tour Australia for the first time.	166
1993–94	Get a Grip Tour	A world tour beginning June 2, 1993 and spanning 18 months, it saw the band go to South America and several European countries for the first time. The tour also included a performance at Woodstock '94. The band closed the tour with a live radio broadcast performance at their club, the Mama Kin Music Hall in Boston, MA.	244
1997–99	Nine Lives Tour	The band's longest tour in its history, it saw them perform in North America, Japan, and Europe on several legs. It was delayed numerous times due to injuries to Steven Tyler and Joey Kramer. The tour was also significantly extended well into 1999, due to the success of "I Don't Want to Miss a Thing" and the live compilation A Little South of Sanity.	204
1999–2000	Roar of the Dragon Tour	Beginning December 29, 1999, the band toured Japan extensively.	6
2001–02	Just Push Play Tour	Began June 6, 2001 in Hartford, Connecticut, to a live TV audience on VH1. The tour saw the band tour amphitheatres and arenas until January 2002. The events of September 11, 2001 caused several dates to be cancelled. Rockin' the Joint was culled from a performance in Las Vegas. The band's Behind the Music also featured footage from this tour.	85
2002	Girls of Summer Tour	Named after the band's new single "Girls of Summer", this was a short North American tour in support of O, Yeah! The Ultimate Aerosmith Hits, it saw the band play about 50 dates, mostly amphitheaters. Kid Rock and Run-DMC opened. Last major performances for Jam Master Jay, who was murdered shortly after Run-DMC completed their opening duties.	51
2003	Rocksimus Maximus Tour	A brief North American tour, it saw the band co-headline with Kiss for a brief tour of predominantly amphitheaters. The band debuted new material from their then-upcoming album Honkin' on Bobo.	59
2004	Honkin' on Bobo Tour	A brief tour starting March 11, 2004, the band played U.S. and Japanese arenas, many in smaller markets. The You Gotta Move DVD was culled from performances at the start of this tour. Cheap Trick opened.	48
2005–06	Rockin' the Joint Tour	The band played arenas in major North American markets, from October 30, 2005, to March 2, 2006. Lenny Kravitz opened. The band was supposed to do a spring leg of smaller markets with Cheap Trick opening, but it was cancelled when Steven Tyler required throat surgery.	44
2006	Route of All Evil Tour	The band co-headlined with Mötley Crüe for a tour in Fall 2006 that sent the band to about 50 major North American venues from September 5 to December 17, 2006. David Hull filled in for bassist Tom Hamilton, who was undergoing treatment for throat cancer. For 5 dates, Aerosmith played alone (Mötley Crüe also played 5 solo-headline dates)	45
2007	Aerosmith World Tour 2007	The band's first tour of Latin America in 14 years and first tour of Europe in 8 years. Also the first time Aerosmith played in India and the United Arab Emirates. The band performed select dates in North America as well.	36
2009	Aerosmith/ZZ Top Tour	A summer/fall tour featuring ZZ Top as the opening act for most shows, this North American tour was sponsored by Guitar Hero: Aerosmith. The tour was scheduled for over 40 shows, but only 15 were performed. A variety of health setbacks caused either Brad Whitford or Tom Hamilton to be replaced for some of the shows. Seven shows were canceled when Steven Tyler injured his leg. The rest of the tour was canceled in early August when Tyler fell off the stage in Sturgis, South Dakota. In October, two Hawaiian shows were played, one as part of a legal settlement for having canceled a show in 2007, and a show in Abu Dhabi was played in November.	18
2010	Cocked, Locked, Ready to Rock Tour	In May, Aerosmith performed in seven Latin American cities, followed by 11 European dates in June and July, and 24 dates in North America in August and September. The tour was meant to re-connect the band and their fans after their ill-fated 2009 summer tour and its associated fallout which almost led to the dissolution of the band. Aerosmith performed in Peru and Greece for the first time in their careers.	42
2011	Back On the Road Tour	In late 2011, Aerosmith performed 18 concerts across Latin America and Japan. The band performed ten shows in Latin America, including six in South America (including performing in Ecuador for the first time ever), one in Central America (performing in Panama for the first time ever), and three in Mexico. The band performed 8 concerts in Japan; these concerts marked the band's first visit to the country in seven years.	18
2012–14	Global Warming Tour	From June through August 2012, returning in November and December of the same year, Aerosmith performed 37 concerts across North America, in addition to about a half-dozen special performances (one private event before the tour's start, one benefit concert, and the remainder were media events in promotion of their new album). The tour consisted mostly of performances in indoor arenas, with a couple shows at outdoor venues, and four festival appearances. Cheap Trick opened during the tour. The tour included four new songs from the album, Music from Another Dimension!, released November 6, 2012. The tour was extended to include 12 concerts across Oceania and Asia in the spring and summer of 2013, four concerts in the United States in the summer of 2013 (in addition to a special performance at the "Boston Strong" benefit event), and 11 concerts in Central and South America in the fall of 2013. As part of the tour, Aerosmith performed in Australia for the first time in 23 years, and the first time ever in New Zealand, the Philippines, Singapore, El Salvador, and Guatemala. In the spring and summer of 2014, Aerosmith performed 17 concerts across Europe.	88
2014	Let Rock Rule Tour	A North American tour opened by Slash (with Myles Kennedy & the Conspirators) from July through September 2014; included two festival appearances and nineteen regular concerts.	21
2015	Blue Army Tour	A North American tour from June through August 2015; included a mix of small venues, large venues, and festivals, many of them in secondary markets. A concert in Moscow was added in September 2015.	17
2016	Rock 'N' Roll Rumble Tour	A Latin American tour plus one performance at the Kaaboo Festival in San Diego, California, from September through October 2016.	11
2017–18	Aero-Vederci Baby! Tour	18 concerts across Europe and the Mideast from May to July 2017, preceded by a performance at the NCAA Final Four Tournament in Phoenix, Arizona in April. Eight tour dates were planned for Latin America in September and October, the last four of which had to be canceled due to Steven Tyler requiring a medical procedure. Also included a corporate event in Arlington, Texas and a festival in New Orleans.	25
2019–22	Aerosmith: Deuces Are Wild	Concert residency that ran from April 2019 through November 2022, with 55 concerts at the Park Theater at Park MGM in Las Vegas and nine concerts at three MGM venues on the East Coast (three shows at the MGM National Harbor in Maryland, two shows at the Borgata in Atlantic City, New Jersey, and four shows at the MGM Springfield in Massachusetts), as well as a 2019 festival performance in Minnesota and a pair of performances in New England in September 2022. This marked Aerosmith's first concert residency.	67
2023	Peace Out: The Farewell Tour	Farewell tour intended to send the band to 41 arenas across North America from September 2023 to February 2025, including the Black Crowes as the opening act. Did not include original drummer Joey Kramer. The tour was postponed after 3 concerts, and later cancelled due to Steve Tyler not being able to recover from his vocal chord injury.	3

== Notable concert performances ==
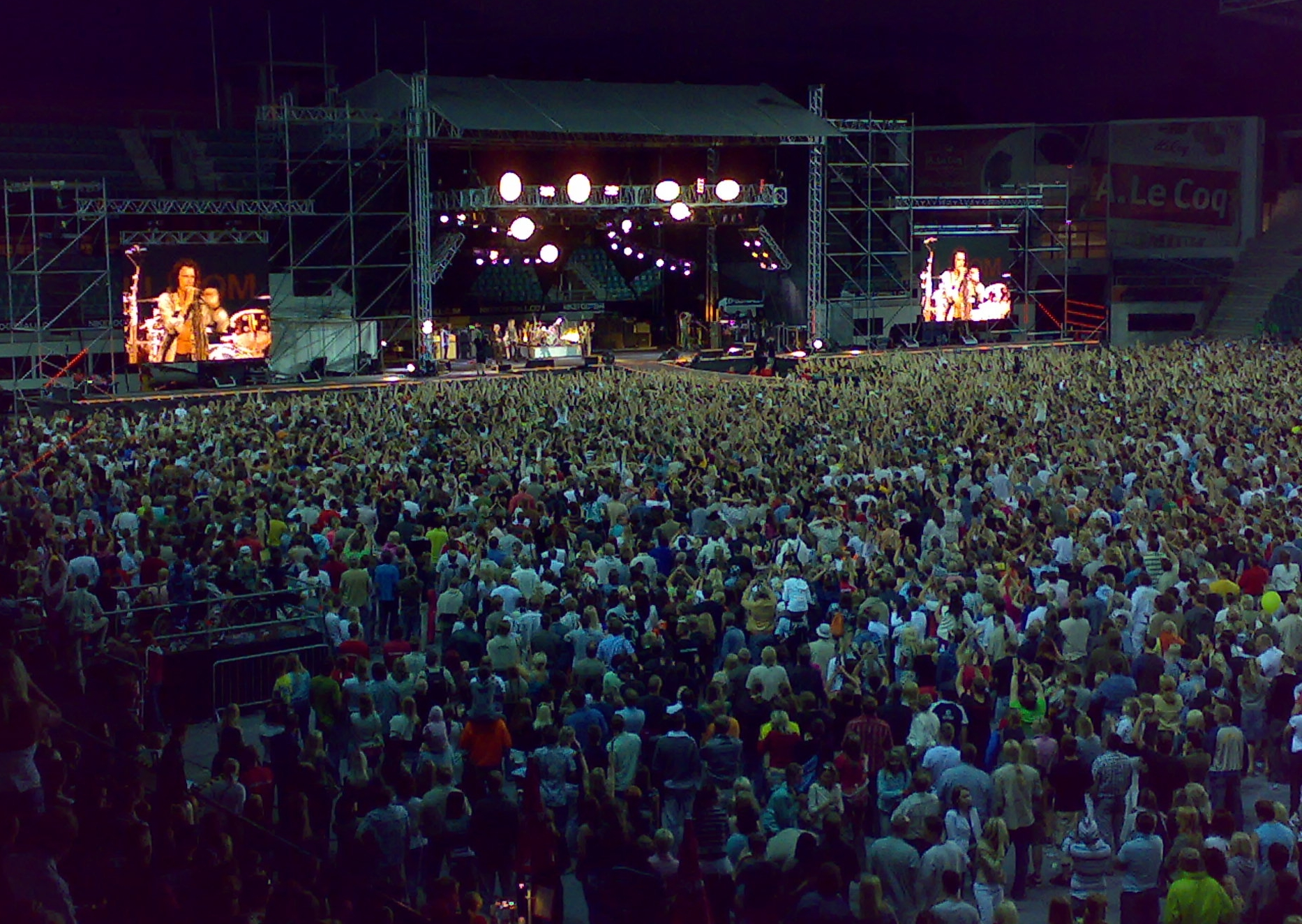
Aerosmith performing in Tallinn, Estonia as part of their 2007 world tour.

- November 6, 1970: Band's first gig: Nipmuc Regional High School in Mendon, Massachusetts
- August 24, 1971: Brad Whitford plays first gig with Aerosmith in Brownsville, Vermont, replacing Ray Tabano
- August 5, 1972: Band's signing: Clive Davis signs Aerosmith to Columbia Records at a gig at Max's Kansas City in New York City
- July 4, 1978: Aerosmith headlined the Texxas World Music Festival - later released on VHS
- February 21, 1990: "Wayne's World" sketch on Saturday Night Live; Performances of "Monkey On My Back" and "Janie's Got a Gun"
- August 18, 1990: Aerosmith plays Monsters of Rock with Jimmy Page
- September 18, 1990: Aerosmith's MTV Unplugged performance airs on television
- December 3, 1991: Performance for MTV's 10th Anniversary show
- 1993: Live performances of "Dude (Looks Like a Lady)" and "Shut Up and Dance" in Wayne's World 2
- October 12, 1993: Performances of "Cryin'" and "Sweet Emotion" on Saturday Night Live; the band also appear in several sketches
- May 21/23, 1994: Aerosmith headlined the Rock am Ring festival
- June 4, 1994: Aerosmith headlined the Monsters of Rock festival
- June 30 / July 3, 1994: Aerosmith headlined the Roskilde Festival
- August 13, 1994: The band performs at Woodstock '94
- November 26, 1994: The band performs at an MTV Europe Thanksgiving show
- December 19, 1994: Performance at the band's Mama Kin Music Hall in Boston, Massachusetts, broadcast live on radio stations
- April 4, 1998: Performance of "Pink" at Nickelodeon's Kid's Choice Awards
- September 9, 1999: Performance of "Walk This Way" with Kid Rock and Run-DMC at MTV Video Music Awards
- January 1, 2000: Performance of "I Don't Want to Miss a Thing" from Osaka, Japan on ABC's New Year's Eve Millennium Celebration
- January 28, 2001: Super Bowl XXXV halftime show in Tampa, Florida where the band performs "I Don't Want to Miss a Thing", debuts their new single "Jaded" and is joined by Britney Spears, 'N Sync, Mary J. Blige, and Nelly for a finale performance of "Walk This Way"
- March 19, 2001: Performance at the band's induction into Rock and Roll Hall of Fame
- October 21, 2001: Performance at United We Stand: What More Can I Give benefit concert in Washington, D.C.
- March 10, 2003: Steven Tyler performs You Shook Me All Night Long with AC/DC at the 2003 Rock and Roll Hall of Fame ceremony after inducting them
- September 4, 2003: Performance at season kickoff of NFL in Washington, D.C.
- December 31, 2003: Performance of "Baby, Please Don't Go" on Dick Clark's New Year's Rockin' Eve
- February 1, 2004: The band headline the pre-game festivities for Super Bowl XXXVIII in Houston, Texas
- June 4, 2004: You Gotta Move special for A&E airs; later released on DVD
- July 4, 2006: Steven Tyler and Joe Perry perform with the Boston Pops Orchestra for the Fourth of July; it was broadcast on CBS
- September 7, 2007: Nationally televised performance at the Fashion Rocks event in New York City. The band performed "Dude (Looks Like a Lady)" and "Walk This Way" (featuring Fergie).
- August 5, 2009: Steven Tyler falls off the stage at the Sturgis Motorcycle Rally resulting in a broken shoulder and stitches in his head, forcing the band the cancel the rest of the tour.
- May 23, 2012: Performance on the season 11 finale of American Idol, where they debut their new single "Legendary Child" and perform their classic hit "Walk This Way"
- November 2, 2012: Performance at "Hurricane Sandy: Coming Together" charity concert for victims of Hurricane Sandy
- November 5, 2012: Performance on the streets of Boston in front of the band's old apartment at 1325 Commonwealth Avenue to promote the release of Music from Another Dimension!
- May 30, 2013: Performance at "Boston Strong" charity concert for victims of the Boston Marathon bombings
- April 2, 2017: Performance at the NCAA Final Four Tournament in Phoenix, Arizona
