= Somebody (Aerosmith song) =

Song by Aerosmith

from the album Aerosmith
- A-side: "Dream On"
- Written: 1970
- Released: June 27, 1973
- Recorded: 1972
- Studio: Intermedia Studios
- Length: 3:45
- Label: Columbia
- Songwriters: Steven Tyler, Steven Emspak
- Producer: Adrian Barber

Audio
- "Somebody" on YouTube

"Somebody" is a song by American rock band Aerosmith. It is the B-side to their debut single, "Dream On", released from their 1973 debut studio album, Aerosmith. Written by lead singer Steven Tyler and his friend Steven Emspak and released in June 1973, its A-side peaked at number 59 nationally but was a major success in the band's home city of Boston, where it was the number 1 single of the year on the less commercial top 40 station WBZ-FM, number 5 for the year on highly rated Top 40 WRKO-AM, and number 16 on heritage Top 40 WMEX-AM.

The riff to "Somebody" is made up from a basic blues-playing technique and Tyler's lyrics tell the story of a character trying to search for the woman of his dreams. The character is in need of someone who shares the work with him and has been through the same difficulties in their life as he has. It was written in 1970.

== Single track listings ==
=== 7" 45 RPM ===
==== Side one ====
1. "Dream On"

==== Side two ====
1. "Somebody"

== Live performances ==
Aerosmith regularly performed the song throughout the early seventies, the first known time was in Mendon, Massachusetts on November 6, 1970, at Nipmuc Regional High School. The last-known performance of the song was in Yokohama, Japan, on June 26, 1988, at the Yokohama Cultural Gymnasium during the Permanent Vacation Tour.
