= Rock for the Rising Sun =

Video by Aerosmith
- Released: July 23, 2013
- Recorded: November–December 2011
- Genre: Hard rock
- Length: 94 minutes
- Label: Eagle Rock Entertainment

Aerosmith chronology
You Gotta Move (2004)	Rock for the Rising Sun (2013)	Aerosmith Rocks Donington 2014 (2015)

Rock for the Rising Sun is a live DVD by American hard rock band Aerosmith. It was released on July 23, 2013. The video chronicles the band's 2011 tour of Japan in the wake of the devastating earthquake and tsunami that struck the country earlier that year. In between performances from various concerts the band performed there, the DVD includes documentary footage of the band as they travel the country and interact with fans.

Rock for the Rising Sun debuted at #1 on Billboard's Top Music Videos chart. The release was screened in select theaters in October 2013.

== Track listing ==
1. "Draw the Line" (Tokyo Dome, Tokyo, Japan - November 28, 2011)
2. "Love in an Elevator" (Ishikawa Sports Center, Kanazawa, Japan - November 22, 2011)
3. "Livin' on the Edge" (Tokyo Dome, Tokyo, Japan - November 28, 2011)
4. "Hangman Jury" (Hiroshima Green Arena, Hiroshima, Japan - November 25, 2011)
5. "No More No More" (Hiroshima Green Arena, Hiroshima, Japan - November 25, 2011)
6. "Mama Kin" (Hiroshima Green Arena, Hiroshima, Japan - November 25, 2011)
7. "Monkey on My Back" (Tokyo Dome, Tokyo, Japan - November 28, 2011)
8. "Toys in the Attic" (Tokyo Dome, Tokyo, Japan - November 30, 2011)
9. "Listen to the Thunder" (Ishikawa Sports Center, Kanazawa, Japan - November 22, 2011)
10. "Sweet Emotion" (Tokyo Dome, Tokyo, Japan - November 30, 2011)
11. "Boogie Man" (Marine Messe Fukuoka, Fukuoka, Japan - December 2, 2011)
12. "Rats in the Cellar" (Osaka Dome, Osaka, Japan - December 6, 2011)
13. "Movin' Out" (Osaka Dome, Osaka, Japan - December 6, 2011)
14. "Last Child" (Aichi Prefectural Gymnasium, Nagoya, Japan - December 8, 2011)
15. "S.O.S. (Too Bad)" (Sapporo Dome, Sapporo, Japan - December 10, 2011)
16. "Walk This Way" (Tokyo Dome, Tokyo, Japan - November 30, 2011)
17. "Train Kept A-Rollin'" (Tokyo Dome, Tokyo, Japan - November 30, 2011) (Final credits)

=== Bonus Tracks ===
1. "Lick and a Promise" (Hiroshima Green Arena, Hiroshima, Japan - November 25, 2011)
2. "One Way Street" (Marine Messe Fukuoka, Fukuoka, Japan - December 2, 2011)

=== Bonus Tracks (Japanese version) ===
1. "Train Kept A-Rollin'" (Tokyo Dome, Tokyo, Japan - November 30, 2011) (Full version)
2. "Lord of the Thighs" (Hiroshima Green Arena, Hiroshima, Japan - November 25, 2011)
3. "Lick and a Promise" (Hiroshima Green Arena, Hiroshima, Japan - November 25, 2011)
4. "One Way Street" (Marine Messe Fukuoka, Fukuoka, Japan - December 2, 2011)
