= Movin' Out (Aerosmith song) =

Song by Aerosmith

from the album Aerosmith
- Released: January 5, 1973
- Recorded: 1972
- Studio: Intermedia (Boston)
- Genre: Hard rock; blues rock; heavy metal
- Length: 5:02
- Label: Columbia
- Songwriters: Steven Tyler; Joe Perry
- Producer: Adrian Barber

"Movin' Out" is a song by the American rock band Aerosmith. It was the first in the songwriting partnership of Steven Tyler and Joe Perry, and was the seventh song on Aerosmith's first album, Aerosmith. Built on a guitar lick played by Perry, "Movin' Out" was recorded on a water bed at the band's apartment, 1325 Commonwealth Avenue. The track appeared on Aerosmith's live compilation, Classics Live! Vol. 2 (1987). An alternative version of the song appears on the band's box set Pandora's Box. The song was re-recorded in 2007 for Guitar Hero: Aerosmith.

== In performance ==
"Movin' Out" is usually played once per tour on average. Before the song starts, Tyler introduces it as the first real Aerosmith song and tells the story of its recording and early Aerosmith history. The first known live performance of the song was on 6 November 1970 at Nipmuc Regional High School in Mendon, Massachusetts.
