= The Loneliest Punk =

Studio album by Fatlip
- Released: November 1, 2005
- Recorded: 1999–2000
- Studios: Hollywood Sound Recorders (Hollywood, CA); Crack Alley Studios (Hollywood, CA); Artisan Sound Recorders (California); Dreamlink Studios (Studio City, CA); Planet Venus West (Hollywood, CA)
- Genre: Hip-hop
- Length: 49:12
- Label: Delicious Vinyl
- Producers: Fatlip; J-Swift; Michael Ross; Printz Board; Squeak E. Clean; Venus Brown

Fatlip chronology
The Loneliest Punk (2005)	Love (2012)

Singles from The Loneliest Punk
- 1. "What's Up Fatlip?" Released: 2000; 2. "Today's Your Day (WhatchaGoneDu)" Released: 2005; 3. "Writer's Block" Released: 2005

The Loneliest Punk (sometimes stylized as Theloneliest Punk) is the debut studio solo album by the American rapper Fatlip. It was released on November 1, 2005, through Delicious Vinyl. The name is a play on "Thelonious Monk", the famous jazz pianist.

Recording sessions took place at Hollywood Sound Recorders, Crack Alley Studios, Artisan Sound Recorders, Dreamlink Studios and Planet Venus West in California. Produced by J-Swift, Michael Ross, Squeak E. Clean, Venus Brown, Printz Board and Fatlip himself under 'Edy Crahp' moniker, it features guest appearances from Chali 2na, Shock G and Volume 10.

The album's lead single, "What's Up Fatlip?", peaked at number 35 on the Hot Rap Songs chart in the United States and was featured in 2005 video game Tony Hawk's American Wasteland. The song "Today's Your Day (Whachagonedu?)" was featured in 2003 video Yeah Right! and in 2005 video game Blitz: The League.

== Critical reception ==
Professional ratings
Aggregate scores
Source	Rating
Metacritic	75/100
Review scores
Source	Rating
AllHipHop	3.5/5 stars
AllMusic	4/5 stars
Entertainment Weekly	B+
Los Angeles Times	3/4 stars
Prefix	6/10
RapReviews	8/10
Stylus	B+

The Loneliest Punk was met with generally favorable reviews from music critics. At Metacritic, which assigns a normalized rating out of 100 to reviews from mainstream publications, the album received an average score of 75, based on six reviews.

Michael Endelman of Entertainment Weekly gave the album "B+", noting "Fatlip comes back stronger and more interesting". Dan Nishimoto of Stylus Magazine stated: "although Punk summarizes Fatlip's traumatic post-Pharcyde life, the record is buoyant with character". Soren Baker of Los Angeles Times described the album as "a largely deranged affair that showcases a warped sense of humor, a strangely appealing, off-key singing style reminiscent of the late Ol' Dirty Bastard, and an explanation for his lengthy hiatus".

In his mixed review for Prefix, Jack Booty wrote: "it plays more like an album reminiscent of the days when hip-hop was something to catch a head nod instead of breaking new ground or shaking the dance floor.

== Track listing ==
No.	Title	Writer(s)	Producer(s)	Length
1.	"Fat Leezy"	Derrick Stewart	Edy Crahp	1:47
2.	"Fatlip (Intro)"	D. Stewart	Edy Crahp	0:35
3.	"First Heat"	D. Stewart; Prince Board	Printz Board	3:43
4.	"The Bass Line"	D. Stewart; Mark Howard James	Mark the 45 King	1:27
5.	"Today's Your Day (Whachagonedu?)" (featuring Chali 2na)	D. Stewart; Charles Stewart; Sam Spiegel; Allen Toussaint	Squeak E. Clean	4:22
6.	"Freestyle"	D. Stewart		0:15
7.	"Joe's Turkey"	D. Stewart; Juan Martinez	J-Swift; Mike Floss; Edy Crahp	4:14
8.	"I Got the Shit"	D. Stewart; James	Mark The 45 King	0:54
9.	"Writer's Block"	D. Stewart; Venus Brown; Martinez	J-Swift; Venus Brown (add.)	3:57
10.	"M.I.A."	D. Stewart; James	Mark The 45 King	0:59
11.	"The Story of Us"	D. Stewart; Martinez	J-Swift	4:22
12.	"Cook"	D. Stewart; Martinez; Mike Floss; Bob Durham; Selim Anchour	J-Swift; Mike Floss; Bob Durham (add.); Selim Anchour (add.)	4:10
13.	"Walkabout"	D. Stewart	Edy Crahp	0:59
14.	"All on Fly"	D. Stewart	Edy Crahp	4:23
15.	"Lyrical Styles"	D. Stewart	Edy Crahp	1:24
16.	"Freaky Pumps" (featuring Shock G and Volume 10)	D. Stewart; Gregory Jacobs; Dino Hawkins; Spiegel	Edy Crahp; Squeak E. Clean	3:54
17.	"He's an Outsider"	D. Stewart	Edy Crahp	0:34
18.	"What's Up Fatlip?"	D. Stewart	Edy Crahp	3:22
19.	"Dreams"	D. Stewart; Brown	Venus Brown	3:51
Total length:				49:12

== Personnel ==
- Derrick "Fatlip"/"Edy Crahp" Stewart – vocals, producer, mixing, executive producer
- Venus Brown – vocals, producer
- Dino "Volume 10" Hawkins – vocals
- Charles "Chali 2na" Stewart – vocals
- Gregory "Shock G." Jacobs – vocals
- Big Scoob – additional vocals
- Janai – additional vocals
- Michael "Mike Floss" Ross – producer, mixing, executive producer, A&R
- Juan "J-Swift" Martinez – producer
- Sam "Squeak E. Clean" Spiegel – producer
- Prince "Printz" Board – producer
- Selim Anchour – additional producer, mixing, editing, sequencing
- Bob Durham – additional producer
- Dylan Dresdow – mixing
- John Lowry – mixing
- Dave Cooley – mixing
- Tom Baker – mastering
- Dina Juntila – layout, design
- Amandi Phillips – photography
