= Walk This Way: The Autobiography of Aerosmith =

1997 book by Stephen Davis

- Author: Stephen Davis, Aerosmith
- Language: English
- Genre: Autobiography
- Publisher: HarperCollins
- Publication date: October 1, 1997
- Publication place: United States
- Media type: Print (Hardback & Paperback)
- Pages: 513 pp (hardback edition)
- ISBN: 0-380-97594-7 (hardback edition)
- OCLC: 37107233
- Dewey Decimal: 782.42166/092 B 21
- LC Class: ML421.A32 A3 1997

Walk This Way: The Autobiography of Aerosmith (ISBN 0-380-97594-7) is a book by Stephen Davis, published by HarperCollins and released in October 1997. It was cowritten with the members of Aerosmith.

The biography contains the lives, legends, women, drugs and partying that nearly killed the Toxic Twins and split the band. It ends with the release of the Nine Lives album.

== Overview ==
Walk This Way is divided into two "books", or sections, with five chapters apiece. Book One chronicles the band from the primary members' early lives until 1975, when their album Toys in the Attic was released and the band was reaching their peak. Book Two chronicles the band from 1976 into their downfall in the early 1980s, then their remarkable comeback of the late 1980s until 1997, when the book was released.

"It’s cute, okay?" remarked guitarist Joe Perry. "It has all the little stories about throwing TVs out of the windows and getting fucked up and me leaving the band."

The book is written in a distinctive fashion, with alternating paragraphs of recollections by the band members, band personnel, family members, friends, and music industry professionals. This results in detailed accounts of events in the band's history from several perspectives. Davis often fills in the blanks between these events, by clarifying things, filling in dates, and making note of notable items in the band's history that may have not been mentioned in the interviews.

Press clippings and reviews are embedded throughout, along with 16 front-to-back pages of photographs, many from the band members' personal collections and not previously publicly released.

The book received rave reviews from Entertainment Weekly, USA Today, and Rolling Stone, as featured on the back cover of the paperback book edition. It was also a New York Times bestseller.

"The book has a grubby yet irresistible quality; the story unfolding album by album, tour by tour, blow job by blow job," wrote Mark Blake in a four-star review for Q. "For fans of the band this will be required reading, but it remains a gripping story for anyone intrigued by the excesses of American rock in the pre-punk age."

Promoting his own autobiography – Rocks: My Life in and Out of Aerosmith – in 2014, Perry complained: "A lot of stuff that was in that book, Walk this Way, was so wrong. Our manager at the time edited the book before we saw it and we didn’t know that. At the end of it all, there were a lot of things going on when that book was going on so it wasn’t like we were completely focused on it."
