= Write Me a Letter =

Song by Aerosmith

from the album Aerosmith
- Released: January 5, 1973
- Recorded: 1972 at Intermedia Studios
- Length: 4:12
- Label: Columbia
- Songwriter: Steven Tyler
- Producer: Adrian Barber

"Write Me a Letter" is a song by American hard rock band Aerosmith. The song was written by lead-singer Steven Tyler and is the sixth song on Aerosmith's self-titled debut album, Aerosmith. The song is mostly a rock and roll song; it starts off with a drum line and goes into slow blues jam with Tyler singing about a letter from a lover he is waiting for. The song is the first use of Steven Tyler's harmonica playing in an Aerosmith song.

== In performance ==
The song was played constantly in the early to mid-seventies and most often was the opening song or the second song in their setlist. The first-known performance of the song was on March 20, 1973, at Paul's Mall in Boston. A live version is included on Pandora's Box.
