= How High 2 =

2019 film by Bruce Leddy

- Theatrical release poster
- Genre: Comedy
- Based on: Characters by Dustin Lee Abraham
- Written by: Shawn Ries; Artie Johann; Alex Blagg; Neel Shah
- Directed by: Bruce Leddy
- Starring: Lil Yachty; D.C. Young Fly; Alyssa Goss; DeRay Davis; Mary Lynn Rajskub; Blac Youngsta; Lil Baby; NeNe Leakes; Karlous Miller; Al Shearer; Marlo Hampton; Cynthia Bailey; Shenikah Anderson; Anthony Elle; T. J. Thyne; Justine Skye; Brook Sill; Chris Cavalier; Mike Epps
- Music by: John Jennings Boyd; Eric V. Hachikian
- Country of origin: United States
- Original language: English

Production
- Executive producers: Lisa Gooding; George Engel; Morgana Rosenberg; Josh Vodnoy; Jason Goldberg; Lil Yachty; Kevin Lee; Brian Sher; Pierre Thomas; Shauna Garr
- Producers: Joseph P. Genier; Greg Holstein; Mike Elliott
- Cinematography: Matthew Rudenberg
- Editor: Rick Weis
- Running time: 88 minutes
- Production companies: Universal 1440 Entertainment; Capital Arts Entertainment; Smith-Garr Productions; MTV

Original release
- Network: MTV
- Release: April 20, 2019

How High 2 is a 2019 American stoner comedy television film directed by Bruce Leddy and starring Lil Yachty and D.C. Young Fly. It is a sequel to the 2001 film How High and first aired on MTV on April 20, 2019. The film centers around two stoners on a mission to track down their missing marijuana and "weed bible". While the sequel changes the lead cast, actors reprising their roles from the original film include Mike Epps, Al Shearer, and T. J. Thyne.

== Plot ==
Roger is an Atlanta stoner who dreams of opening up a weed delivery business but was recently fired from his fast food job. He lives in his mother's basement with his ride share driver cousin Calvin, who moonlights as a weed dealer. While Atlanta is in the midst of a weed shortage, the pair find a "Weed Bible" in their basement which shows them how to grow a special new kind of weed. They then set off to start a weed delivery business but their stash and weed bible is stolen. With the help of Roger's childhood friend Alicia, they set off on a mission across the city to track down their stash while fending off rival drug dealers, the Russian mob, college fraternity and sorority students, and a pharmaceutical corporation.

== Cast ==
- Lil Yachty as Roger Silas
- D.C. Young Fly as Calvin
- Alyssa Goss as Alicia
- DeRay Davis as Big Bang
- Mary Lynn Rajskub as Ana Cheever
- Blac Youngsta as Himself
- Lil Baby as Himself
- NeNe Leakes as Mrs. Silas
- Karlous Miller as Larry
- Al Shearer as I Got Money
- Marlo Hampton as Herself
- Cynthia Bailey as Herself
- Shenikah Anderson as Herself
- Anthony Elle as Quienton
- T. J. Thyne as Gerald Picklestein
- Justine Skye as Steffi
- Brook Sill as Meegan
- Chris Cavalier as Tobin
- Mike Epps as Baby Powder
- Jansen Panettiere as Hayes
- Anya Monzikova as Irena Ivanov
- YFN Lucci as Himself

== Production ==
In May 2002, a sequel to How High was reported as being written by Don D. Scott (the co-writer of Barbershop), with Method Man and Redman reprising their roles.

In October 2008, Redman revealed that a script for the How High sequel was still being written, stating that "we wanna represent all the smokers", believing that no one had since done justice on a stoner film. In April 2009, it was reported that Redman blamed Universal Pictures for the film's delay, stating: "They're not opening that money door for us to shoot it. We promoted the shit out of that movie. We got the whole world waiting for a How High 2."

In December 2010, Redman confirmed that Universal Pictures was indeed holding the rights to How High, so the chances of How High 2 coming out were slim. In April 2013, Method Man told TMZ that the script was being written by Dustin Lee Abraham, who wrote the first one, but it all would depend on Universal if the film would happen.

In November 2015, Redman stated that the film would be released in 2017. Matt "M-80" Markoff confirmed a completed script in 2017. Redman stated the script was being "rewritten" because he did not approve, and he expected production to begin late 2017, early 2018. In November 2017, Redman said that if the draft was not as funny as the original, he and Method Man would move on to something other than the sequel. Redman later confirmed that he and Method Man were not reprising their roles in the sequel because "the business wasn't right".

=== With new leads ===
The sequel was greenlit by MTV and Universal 1440 Entertainment as of June 25, 2018 and was announced to take place in Atlanta. Production started as of September 25, 2018 and the film was announced to star Lil Yachty and DC Young Fly. On March 7, 2019, MTV announced that the film How High 2 would premiere on 4/20, 2019, and that Mike Epps would reprise his role of Baby Powder from the first film. They also released the opening credits sequence.

== Reception ==
How High 2 on its premiere airing drew 801,000 viewers in live + same day viewing and a 0.64 rating in viewers aged 18–49, giving MTV its highest-rated Saturday in six years.
