= Guitar Hero: Aerosmith =

2008 video game

- Cover art. From left: Brad Whitford, Steven Tyler, Joe Perry, Tom Hamilton and Joey Kramer.
- Developer: Neversoft (Note: Ported to PlayStation 2 by Budcat Creations, ported to Wii by Vicarious Visions and ported to Windows and Mac by Aspyr)
- Publisher: Activision (Note: Published to Windows and Mac by Aspyr)
- Series: Guitar Hero
- Platforms: PlayStation 2, PlayStation 3, Wii, Xbox 360, Microsoft Windows, OS X
- Release: PlayStation 2, PlayStation 3, Wii, Xbox 360: NA: June 29, 2008; EU: July 27, 2008; AU: August 6, 2008; Microsoft Windows, OS X: NA: October 21, 2008
- Genre: Rhythm
- Modes: Single-player, multiplayer

Guitar Hero: Aerosmith is a 2008 rhythm game developed by Neversoft and published by Activision. It is the fifth installment in the Guitar Hero series and the first to focus on the career and songs of one rock band, Aerosmith. The game was released for the PlayStation 2, PlayStation 3, Xbox 360, and Wii on June 29, 2008 in North America, on July 27 2008, in Europe, and on August 6, 2008 in Australia. Aspyr published the Microsoft Windows and Mac OS X versions of the game, releasing them on October 21, 2008. Guitar Hero: Aerosmith sold as both a bundle with a specially designed guitar controller as well as a game-only package.

The game is considered an expansion in the Guitar Hero series, extending upon the general features of Guitar Hero III: Legends of Rock. As with other games in the series, the player uses a guitar-shaped controller to simulate the playing of rock music by playing in-time to scrolling notes on-screen. Aerosmith songs comprise approximately 70% of the soundtrack, while the remaining songs are from bands that have been influenced by or opened for Aerosmith. The single player Career mode allows the player to follow the history of the band through several real-world-inspired venues, interspersed with interviews from the band members about their past. Aerosmith re-recorded four songs for this game, and have participated in a motion capture session to create their in-game appearances. Guitar Hero: Aerosmith is the final installment of the series to only feature guitar and bass as possible instrument choices. The next entry (Guitar Hero World Tour) would introduce other roles to create a full band experience.

While Guitar Hero: Aerosmith maintains the same gameplay as past Guitar Hero games, it has received criticism for being shorter and easier than the previous Guitar Hero titles and difficult to justify its price point; furthermore, with the game's strong focus on one band, reviewers felt that the game's ultimate enjoyment rested on the player's appreciation and fandom for the music of Aerosmith.

== Story ==
A departure from other games in the franchise, Guitar Hero: Aerosmith follows the career of Aerosmith, by playing significant songs in their catalog in a 'rough chronological fashion'. The gameplay follows the band through various periods in its history, spanning from its first show at Mendon Nipmuc Regional High School in 1970 to the 2001 Super Bowl XXXV halftime show, to their induction into the Rock and Roll Hall of Fame on March 19, 2001. The player starts as Joe Perry, and will eventually be able to unlock Brad Whitford and Tom Hamilton. The game does not focus on the internal strife and stress within the band; guitarist Joe Perry stated that the game would focus on the positive aspects of Aerosmith's history. Perry has stated that "Having a game built around Aerosmith has been a huge honor and really a great experience for us. We've put a lot of ideas into the game so that fans can have fun interacting with our music, getting inside our body of work and learning about the band's history."

== Gameplay ==
To play the game, players must use a guitar peripheral to play the scrolling notes. Players must hold a colored fret on the peripheral corresponding to the on-screen note and then press the peripheral's strum bar as the note crosses the target.

The gameplay in Guitar Hero: Aerosmith is based on the same gameplay elements from Guitar Hero III: Legends of Rock. Players use a guitar controller to hold down fret keys and strum on the strum bar in time with the note patterns as they scroll down the screen in order to complete a song. The player's performance is tracked by a Rock Meter, and if it falls too low, the song ends prematurely. Star Power can be collected by completing marked note phrases correctly, and by using the whammy bar during sustained notes; Star Power is released by lifting the guitar controller vertically or by pressing the Select button in order to double the scoring multiplier and dramatically affect the Rock Meter. The player is rated after successfully completing a song from 3 to 5 stars, and can examine statistics related to their performance, and in Career mode, awarded money to be used to unlock ten bonus songs in "The Vault" and additional guitars, outfits, and other videos about the band. Each song can be played at one of four difficulties: Easy, Medium, Hard, and Expert.

The game offers several gameplay modes. Career mode is broken into six tiers of five tracks, each based on a period in Aerosmith's history. Furthermore, within each tier, there are two Opening Acts, featuring non-Aerosmith songs, that must be completed before the Aerosmith songs can be played; the final song in each tier is an encore once the other four songs are completed. As the player completes this mode, they will also be presented with video clips talking about the band and other trivia about the band. The Career mode features one Boss Battle (against Joe Perry) as introduced in Guitar Hero III. Any unlocked song can be played in Quick Play mode, Co-operative mode, with one player on lead guitar and the other on bass, and Competitive mode, including the Battle modes. Unlike Guitar Hero III, there is no Co-Operative Career mode. One significant upgrade from Guitar Hero III is the addition of score balancing in Pro Face Off multiplayer mode, which allows each player to choose their own difficulty while still allowing each side to play the full note chart, instead of switching back and forth within regular Face Off. This is the first Guitar Hero game compatible with Rock Band controllers.

== Development ==
Billboard announced that the band Aerosmith was "working closely with the makers of Guitar Hero World Tour, which will be dedicated to the group's music." Guitar Hero: World Tour was also confirmed as in development following the announcement of the merger between Activision and Vivendi Games in December 2007.

On February 15, 2008, Activision announced that one of their two new Guitar Hero installments would be Guitar Hero: Aerosmith, and would be released in June 2008. Guitar Hero: Aerosmith was developed by Neversoft for the PlayStation 3 and Xbox 360 versions, the Wii version of the game was being developed by Vicarious Visions, and the PlayStation 2 version was developed by Budcat Creations.

Members of the band Aerosmith, including Steven Tyler (left) and Joe Perry (right) performed motion capture in order to create their digital likeness for the game.

The idea for Guitar Hero: Aerosmith came about during the development of Guitar Hero III. Originally, a cover version of "Same Old Song and Dance" was present in the game, but Neversoft president Joel Jewett noted that the quality of the recording was poor. After getting in contact with Joe Perry, Perry was able to provide the original masters for the song, and, according to Neversoft developer Alan Flores, "that sort of established the relationship." This also came at a time when Activision was attempting to expand the Guitar Hero franchise, and fans expressed a strong interest in playing a game focused solely on Aerosmith's works, according to RedOctane's Dusty Welch. Another producer for the game, Aaron Habibipour, stated that Aerosmith was one of the five "holy grail" musical groups as polled by Activision. Newsweek reported that Aerosmith's license allows for exclusive use of their songs within the Guitar Hero series for a limited amount of time, preventing their use within other rhythm games such as Rock Band. This is not the first time Aerosmith have appeared in video games. The band was previously featured in both Quest for Fame and Revolution X.

Similar to Slash, Tom Morello, and Bret Michaels in Guitar Hero III: Legends of Rock, each member of Aerosmith participated in motion capture to accurately recreate themselves digitally for the game. Joe Perry, Brad Whitford, and Tom Hamilton (the lead guitar, rhythm guitar, and bass players of Aerosmith respectively) are unlockable characters which can be played as. Additionally, Darryl "DMC" McDaniels appears in the game as a member of the band, Run-DMC. D.M.C. appears as a playable character as an unlockable character as well. All other members of Aerosmith and Run-DMC are not unlockable and can not be played in the game.

While Aerosmith was able to provide many of the original master recordings to the development team, the band re-recorded the four songs chosen for the game from their first album: "Make It", "Movin' Out", "Dream On" and "Mama Kin". Joe Perry re-mastered the lead guitar on many songs to interact with the gameplay better, while Steven Tyler re-recorded some of the vocals.

The game itself is based much on Guitar Hero III: Legends of Rock's mechanics with some improvements; notably, hammer-ons and pull-offs are "less mushy", there are new venues for the game, and while all other gameplay modes from Guitar Hero III are present, there is no co-op career mode. The game's interfaces and menus were redesigned for the game. Additionally, the team re-evaluated the difficulty of the game based on feedback from players of Guitar Hero III who felt that there were "too many brick walls for casual fans".

The developers attempted to recreate as many of historical venues within the game. For example, to fulfill Joe Perry's request that they recreate Max's Kansas City in New York, the developers used old photographs and YouTube videos of the club during the 1970s, to a highly accurate degree, as claimed by those that had attended the club during that period. Within these venues, set decorations are inspired from Aerosmith album covers. Five that were confirmed are Pump, Toys in the Attic, Just Push Play, Get Your Wings, and Nine Lives.

During Activision's press conference at the 2008 E3 convention, it was announced that a long-standing dispute between Activision and Electronic Arts over the use of guitar controllers in their respective games had been resolved; Guitar Hero: Aerosmith on the 360 was patched after released to allow the use of the Rock Band controller within the game, while all such instruments will be usable in Guitar Hero World Tour. Guitar Hero and Rock Band guitar controllers for both PlayStation 3 and Xbox 360 are also compatible with the Playstation 2 version of Guitar Hero: Aerosmith.

=== Promotion ===
Activision released Aerosmith's "Dream On" to the Xbox Live Marketplace and the PlayStation Store as a free Guitar Hero III: Legends of Rock downloadable song. The free download was available from February 16–18, 2008, after which it was removed pending the release of the game.

The members of Aerosmith participated in a special sneak preview event at the Hard Rock Cafe in New York City on June 27, 2008, allowing attendees to ask questions, eat food at the Hard Rock Cafe, and try out the game. Target had Chip Ganassi's #40 car, driven by Dario Franchitti, painted to celebrate the release of Guitar Hero: Aerosmith for a NASCAR race on June 29, 2008.

As with some of the previous installments in the series, Guitar Hero: Aerosmith is available as both a standalone disc and as part of a bundle. This bundle includes the Gibson Les Paul controller and a special red faceplate with the Aerosmith logo in white. The bundle also includes a tour book for the game listing the songs featured in the game. The special Aerosmith bundle is available for the PlayStation 3, Xbox 360, and Wii versions. The Playstation 2 bundle includes the Kramer Wireless controller included with Guitar Hero III: Legends of Rock. There is also a very limited edition bundle for the PlayStation 2 at Wal-Mart. This bundle comes with the game and two wired Gibson SG guitar controllers as bundled with the original Guitar Hero and its sequel.

== Soundtrack ==
Guitar Hero: Aerosmith's soundtrack consists of 41 songs; thirty are playable during Career mode and another 11 songs are unlockable in the vault. Twenty-nine of the songs are from Aerosmith, while the other twelve songs are from bands that inspired or have played with Aerosmith in the past. Most of the songs are master recordings, including four Aerosmith songs that were re-recorded for this game. Four songs are covers—two performed by Wavegroup Sound and two by Steve Ouimette.

== Reception ==
Reception

Aggregate scores
Aggregator	Score
GameRankings	71%
Metacritic	70/100

Review scores
Publication	Score
Eurogamer	6/10
Game Informer	8/10
GameSpot	7.0/10
GameSpy	3.5/5.0
GameZone	8.0/10
IGN	7.6/10
Official Xbox Magazine (US)	8.0/10
X-Play	3/5

The game has received generally mixed reviews. Many reviews found the game avoided some of Aerosmith's "more popular sugar-coated hits...like 'Amazing', 'Crazy', or 'I Don't Wanna Miss a Thing' [sic]", but felt that other major Aerosmith songs could have also been included. Game Informer noted that "creating a band specific game was smart", but that "very little has changed from the base game". They also complimented the great job that Activision did with their motion captures of Aerosmith. The difficulty of the game was not to be found as hard as Guitar Hero III due to the "very riff-friendly guitarist" Joe Perry; while reviewers felt this was a good correction from the previous game, they also noted that the easiness of Guitar Hero: Aerosmith led to some bland tiers, repetitive musical sections, and lack of any significant difficulty curve. The length of the game was poorly received, with reviewers commenting that it is difficult to justify the title priced equivalently as other next-generation console full games. Eurogamer commented that one's appreciation for the game "lives or dies based on [the player's] fondness for Aerosmith", and that ultimately, with other available music games that offer additional downloadable songs, a game that focuses on a single band would need "to offer gameplay innovations, spectacular fan service, or a lot more material" than what Guitar Hero: Aerosmith provides. Reviews also noted the sparseness of downloadable content.

Guitar Hero: Aerosmith sold more than 567,000 copies in its first week and grossed more than $25 million. The game has seen more than $50 million in sales in the first three months following its release, with over one million copies sold. The band itself saw a 40% increase in their catalog sales in the weeks following the game's release. According to Activision-Blizzard CEO Bobby Kotick, Guitar Hero: Aerosmith has made more money for the band than any sales of their previous albums. The game surged in sales in April 2009, with 110,000 copies for the Xbox 360 sold in North America, due to retails discounts on the title following the release of Guitar Hero: Metallica, and actually outsold the newer title. By April 2010, the game has seen more than 3.6 million units sold, 2.7 in North America, and is considered the best selling band-centric music game across both Guitar Hero and Rock Band series.
