= Bad Man (Buc Fifty album) =

Studio album by Buc Fifty
- Released: August 6, 2002
- Studio: Hipposonic Studios
- Genre: Hip-hop
- Length: 64:17
- Label: Battle Axe Records
- Producers: E MC Square; Ralph M; J-Swift; Rob the Viking; Buc Fifty; Kemo; Paul Meadow

Buc Fifty chronology
Bad Man (2002)	Serve the Devil, Praise the Lord (2004)

Singles from Bad Man
- 1. "Bad Man" Released: 2000

"Bad Man" single cover

Professional ratings
Review scores
Source	Rating
Chronic'art	3/5
HIJS	(negative)
HipHopInfinity	2.66/5 stars
RapManiacz	2/5

Professional ratings for "Bad Man" single
Review scores
Source	Rating
RapReviews	5/10

Bad Man is the debut studio album by rapper Buc Fifty, released by Battle Axe Records on August 6, 2002. Four songs from the album first appeared on the 2000 compilation album Battle Axe Warriors. The album's title track, which samples Scarface and "Dream On" by Aerosmith, reached number 9 on Gavin Report's rap/hip-hop radio airplay chart, and number 7 on Hits Magazine's Rap Radio Top Thirty.

== Track listing ==
No.	Title	Producer	Length
1.	"Bad Man"	E MC Square	4:44
2.	"Putting Check Down"	Ralph M	3:55
3.	"Life Ain't Fair"	Ralph M	4:29
4.	"Gangster (Murderville)"	J-Swift	2:54
5.	"Still Getting Over"	Rob the Viking	3:33
6.	"See the Light"	Rob the Viking	3:00
7.	"Go For Mine" (featuring Madchild and Kutfather)	Rob the Viking	4:22
8.	"Manifest Destiny"	J-Swift	4:23
9.	"Glock and a Dream"	Rob the Viking	3:04
10.	"You Fear Me"	Kemo	4:00
11.	"I'm Rollin"	Kemo	3:55
12.	"Like a G"	Rob the Viking	4:25
13.	"Death Appeal"	Paul Meadow	3:11
14.	"I'm Sorry"	Paul Meadow	3:49
15.	"Drama"	Buc Fifty; Rob the Viking	4:14
16.	"On My Own"	Buc Fifty; Rob the Viking	2:58
17.	"Planet Alignment" (featuring Freestyle and Swollen Members)	Rob the Viking	3:21
Total length:			64:17
