= How High =

2001 film by Jesse Dylan

- Theatrical release poster
- Directed by: Jesse Dylan
- Written by: Dustin Abraham
- Produced by: Pamela Abdy; Danny DeVito; James Ellis; Shauna Garr; Michael Shamberg; Stacey Sher
- Starring: Redman; Method Man; Obba Babatundé; Mike Epps; Jeffrey Jones; Fred Willard
- Cinematography: Francis Kenny
- Edited by: Larry Bock
- Music by: Rockwilder
- Production companies: Jersey Films; Native Pictures
- Distributed by: Universal Pictures
- Release date: December 21, 2001
- Running time: 103 minutes
- Country: United States
- Language: English
- Budget: $12–20 million
- Box office: $31.3 million

How High is a 2001 American stoner comedy film directed by Jesse Dylan in his feature directorial debut and written by Dustin Lee Abraham. The film stars Method Man and Redman as two cannabis, Silas P. Silas and Jamal King, users who gain admission to Harvard University with the supernatural help of a deceased friend whose ashes were used to fertilize a marijuana plant. Obba Babatundé, Mike Epps, Jeffrey Jones, and Fred Willard also appear in supporting roles.

Produced by Jersey Films and Native Pictures and distributed by Universal Pictures, How High was released on December 21, 2001. The film received generally negative reviews from critics, but later gained a cult following. A television sequel, How High 2, was released in 2019.

== Plot ==
Silas and Jamal are two underachieving stoners preparing to take their "THC" exam—a parody of the SAT and a reference to marijuana's active ingredient. Silas has a new strain of marijuana, grown using the ashes of his recently deceased friend Ivory. Jamal has a cigar but no weed, while Silas has weed but no cigar. They team up, smoke together, and discover that doing so summons Ivory's ghost, visible only to them. During the exam, Ivory gives them all the answers, allowing them to score perfect results.

Several colleges offer them scholarships, but none seem interesting until the Chancellor of Harvard, under pressure to increase minority enrollment, convinces them to attend. Once at Harvard, they meet Bart, the snobbish rowing team captain; his girlfriend Lauren; their silent, thieving friend known as I Need Money; and their roommates Jeffrey and Tuan. Dean Carl Cain informs them they must maintain a minimum 2.0 GPA to remain enrolled.

Jamal joins the rowing team to compete with Bart, while Silas signs up for botany to refine his marijuana-growing skills. Both also take black history. With Ivory's help, they easily pass all their classes. Silas develops a romantic relationship with Lauren, and Jamal begins dating Jamie, the daughter of the U.S. vice president.

As the semester goes on, their disruptive antics—pranks and petty theft—anger Bart, Jeffrey (who's pledging a final club), and Dean Carl Cain. Things unravel after a raucous Halloween party when Gerald, a volunteer campus officer whose bike was destroyed by I Need Money, steals and smokes the Ivory plant, cutting off their access to Ivory's ghost.

Desperate to stay in school, Silas starts working on a truth serum for his botany final, hoping it will earn him an A and secure his spot next semester. His experiments repeatedly fail. Jamal suggests they dig up a "smart dead guy" and smoke his remains—eventually targeting John Quincy Adams—but this plan also fails. They try studying, but still fail most of their midterms.

Meanwhile, Gerald—now a heavy stoner—has a vision of Ivory, who persuades him to return the remaining bit of the plant to Silas and Jamal. However, the supply is too small to help them improve their grades. Just as they prepare to give up, Jeffrey reminds Silas that success with his truth serum would guarantee his continuation at Harvard. Silas finally perfects the serum using the last of Ivory's leaves.

Though their grades exclude them from the alumni party, Jamie invites them as her dates. At the event, Silas tests his serum, and it works. Lauren presents a discovery among Benjamin Franklin's artifacts that shocks the crowd—a historical bong. Ivory appears with Franklin's ghost to confirm its authenticity. Dean Carl Cain is outraged, but the Chancellor, fed up, fires him.

As the party continues, Dean Carl Cain returns with an axe in a failed attempt to attack Silas and Jamal. He is stopped by Secret Service agents. In the end, both are allowed to stay at Harvard. Jamie's father approves of her relationship with Jamal, and Lauren leaves Bart for Silas, claiming Bart "can't satisfy her."

== Cast ==
- Redman as Jamal King
- Method Man as Silas P. Silas
- Obba Babatundé as Dean Carl Cain
- Mike Epps as "Baby Powder"
- Fred Willard as Phil Huntley
- Anna Maria Horsford as Mamma King
- Spalding Gray as Professor Jackson
- Jeffrey Jones as The Vice President
- Hector Elizondo as Bill, The Crew Coach
- Lark Voorhies as Lauren
- Al Shearer as "I Need Money"
- Chuck Davis as Ivory
- Chris Elwood as Bart
- Essence Atkins as Jamie
- T.J. Thyne as Gerald
- Justin Urich as Jeffrey
- Trieu Tran as Tuan
- Dennison Samaroo as Amir
- Tracey Walter as Professor Wood
- Garrett Morris as Canned Pork Chop Commercial Pitchman Along with Tracy Morgan
- Alem Brhan as Jamaican
- Amber Smith as Professor Garr
- Melissa Peterman as Sheila Cain
- Tracy Morgan as Commercial Actor / Field of Dreams Guy (uncredited)
- Cypress Hill as Themselves
- Chuck Liddell as Himself in the Party Fight Scene
- Pat Finn as Army Recruiter
- Judah Friedlander as The Bicyclist
- Patricia Fisher as "End Table Ass"
- Sacha Kemp as "Hella Back"
- Scruncho as "Baby Wipes"

== Reception ==
=== Box office ===
How High collected $7.1 million during its opening weekend, ranking in fifth place at the box office below The Lord of the Rings: The Fellowship of the Ring, Ocean's Eleven, Jimmy Neutron: Boy Genius and Vanilla Sky.

=== Critical response ===
On review aggregator Rotten Tomatoes, How High has an approval rating of 25% based on 59 reviews, with an average rating of 3.9/10. The website's critical consensus reads, "How High is a sloppily constructed stoner movie filled with lame, vulgar jokes." On Metacritic, the film received a score of 29 based on 21 reviews, indicating "generally unfavorable" reviews.

Mike Clark of USA Today gave the film two and a half stars out of four. He concluded that it did not have enough material "to sustain its 91 minutes" but did have enough "low-grade laughs" for its target audience. Ellen Kim of Seattle Post-Intelligencer said, "Unfortunately, this low-lowbrow comedy, which tries to pass itself off as a Friday crossed with Legally Blonde, also does nothing to distinguish itself from recent urban flops The Wash and Pootie Tang."

Writing for the San Francisco Chronicle, Bob Graham noted that "It looks like a movie somebody hallucinated and put up on the screen". He praised some humorous scenes such as the exhumation of John Quincy Adams, but criticized an abrupt ending.

Entertainment Weekly rated it third in their "Best Stoner Movie" top ten list. It also won the Stony Award for Best Stoner Movie in 2002.

== Home media ==
How High was released on DVD and VHS on May 21, 2002.

== Sequel ==
In May 2002, a television sequel to How High was reported as being written by Don D. Scott (the co-writer of Barbershop), with Method Man and Redman reprising their roles.

In October 2008, Redman revealed that a script for the sequel was still in the middle of being written, stating that "we wanna represent all the smokers", believing that since How High, no one has done justice on a stoner film. In April 2009, it was reported that Redman blamed Universal Pictures for the film's delay, stating: "They're not opening that money door for us to shoot it. We promoted the shit out of that movie. We got the whole world waiting for a How High 2."

In December 2010, Redman confirmed that Universal Pictures was indeed holding the rights to How High, so the chances of How High 2 coming out were slim. In April 2013, Method Man told TMZ that the script was being written by Dustin Lee Abraham, who wrote the first one, but it all would depend on Universal if the film would happen. In November 2015, Redman stated How High 2 would be released in 2017.

In 2017, there was a written script, confirmed by Matt "M-80" Markoff. Redman stated that the script was being rewritten, and he expected production to begin late 2017, early 2018; he also stated he and Method Man could move on to something other than the sequel. The two men confirmed they would not reprise their roles in the sequel because "the business wasn't right".

The sequel was greenlit by MTV and Universal 1440 Entertainment in June 2018. The film takes place in Atlanta and production began September 25, 2018, starring Lil' Yachty and D.C. Young Fly. MTV announced How High 2 would premiere on April 20, 2019, with Mike Epps reprising his role as Baby Powder.
