= Rachel Bloznalis =

American association football player

Personal information
- Full name: Rachel Grace Bloznalis
- Date of birth: May 25, 1995 (age 31)
- Place of birth: Upton, Massachusetts, United States
- Height: 1.73 m (5 ft 8 in)
- Position: Defender

Youth career
- 2005–2013: NEFC
- 2010–2013: Nipmuc Regional High School

College career
Years	Team	Apps	(Gls)
2013–2017	Boston University	82	(5)

Senior career*
Years	Team	Apps	(Gls)
2018–2019	Umeå IK	55	(3)
2020–2021	Djurgården	21	(2)

International career
2018	United States U23		
- * Club domestic league appearances and goals

Rachel Grace Bloznalis (born May 25, 1995) is an American soccer player who played for Djurgården in the Swedish Damallsvenskan.

== Early life ==
=== New England Football Club ===
Bloznalis played youth soccer for New England Football Club from U10 until U18.

=== Boston University ===
Bloznalis joined the Boston University Terriers as a freshman in 2013. In her freshman year, Bloznalis played in 18 games as part of a defense responsible for shutting out 16 opponents. As a sophomore she started in two games before suffering a season-ending injury. As a junior she started in 19 games and finished with two goals and four assists and was named to the 2015 All-Patriot League First Team. In her senior year as captain she started all 21 games, finished the season with 3 goals and was named Patriot League Defender of the Year and United Soccer Coaches All-Region First Team. In November of her senior season the NCAA granted her a fifth year of eligibility for the 2018 season as Bloznalis pursued her master's degree in public health. In her graduate season as captain Bloznalis was once again named Patriot League Defender of the Year, All-Patriot League First Team as well as United Soccer Coaches All-East Region First Team. She was also named to the MAC Hermann Trophy Watch List.

In 2018, Bloznalis was selected as the Boston University Woman of the Year, which honors the female student-athlete who best exemplifies a commitment to service, leadership, athletics and academics during her collegiate career.

== Professional career ==
Bloznalis signed for Elitettan side Umeå IK in February 2018. Bloznalis started in 51 of 52 matches during her two seasons in Umeå leading the team with minutes played. In her second year with Umeå IK, Bloznalis led the side to a first place finish in the 2019 Elitettan standings and subsequent promotion to Damallsvenskan.

In November 2019, Bloznalis signed with Swedish Damallsvenskan team Djurgårdens IF. In September 2020, Bloznalis signed a two-year extension with Swedish Damallsvenskan team Djurgårdens IF.

In July 2021, she left Djurgården after damages of a concussion earlier in the 2021 season.

== International career ==
In August 2018, Bloznalis was selected to the US U23 Women's National Team. During this stint Bloznalis helped lead the team to a first place finish in the 2018 Nordic Tournament.

== Honours ==
Umeå IK

- Elitettan champions (2019)

Individual

- Patriot League Defender of the Year (2016, 2017)
- All-Patriot League First Team (2015, 2016, 2017)
- Academic All-Patriot League (2016, 2017)
- Senior CLASS Award Candidate (2016, 2017)
- MAC Hermann Trophy Watch List (2017)
- United Soccer Coaches Scholar All-American (2016,2017)
- United Soccer Coaches All-East Region First Team (2017)
- United Soccer Coaches First Team Scholar All-East Region (2017)
- All-ECAC First Team (2017)
- New England Soccer Journal Defender of the Year (2017)
- NSCAA All-Region First Team (2016)
- Patriot League Academic Honor Roll (2014, 2015, 2016)
- Patriot League Preseason Defender of the Year (2016, 2017)
