= You Gotta Move (video) =

Video by Aerosmith
- Released: November 23, 2004
- Recorded: April 3, 2004
- Venue: Office Depot Center in Sunrise, Florida
- Genre: Hard rock
- Length: 168 minutes
- Label: Columbia

Aerosmith chronology
Big Ones You Can Look At (1994)	You Gotta Move (2004)	Rock for the Rising Sun (2013)

Professional ratings
Review scores
Source	Rating
Allmusic	3/5 stars

You Gotta Move is a live DVD by the American hard rock band Aerosmith. It was released on November 23, 2004. It was filmed live at the Office Depot Center in Sunrise, Florida on April 3, 2004 (except for "Back in the Saddle", "Same Old Song and Dance" and "Rats In The Cellar" which were recorded in Orlando, FL on April 5, 2004.) on the Honkin' on Bobo Tour.

The DVD features concert footage, band interviews, behind the scenes footage and a photo gallery. It also comes with a bonus audio CD featuring 6 tracks from the concert.

You Gotta Move quickly became the band's bestselling video release and one of the highest-selling music videos for the year 2005. That year, it went 4× Platinum in the United States.

== Track listing ==
1. "Toys in the Attic"
2. "Love in an Elevator"
3. "Road Runner"
4. "Baby, Please Don't Go"
5. "Cryin'"
6. "The Other Side"
7. "Back in the Saddle"
8. "Draw The Line"
9. "Dream On"
10. "Stop Messin' Around"
11. "Jaded"
12. "I Don't Want to Miss a Thing"
13. "Sweet Emotion"
14. "Never Loved a Girl"
15. "Walk This Way"
16. "Train Kept A-Rollin'"

=== Bonus Tracks ===
1. "Fever"
2. "Rats in the Cellar"
3. "Livin' on the Edge"
4. "Last Child"
5. "Same Old Song and Dance"

=== Bonus Audio CD ===
1. "Toys in the Attic"
2. "Love in an Elevator"
3. "Rats in the Cellar"
4. "Road Runner"
5. "The Other Side"
6. "Back in the Saddle"
7. "You Gotta Move - "Umixit" Track"

== Certifications ==
Region	Certification	Certified units/sales
Australia (ARIA)	Platinum	15,000^{^}
United Kingdom (BPI)	Gold	25,000^{^}
United States (RIAA)	4× Platinum	400,000^{^}
^{^} Shipments figures based on certification alone.
