= Buc Fifty =

American rapper

- Also known as: Bucwheed; Buckwheat
- Born: Rashaan Jackson; 1973 (age 52–53); New Rochelle, New York
- Origin: Los Angeles, California
- Genre: Hip-hop
- Occupations: Rapper; songwriter
- Years active: 1989–2011
- Labels: Battle Axe Records; Delicious Vinyl
- Formerly of: The Wascals

Rashaan Jackson (born 1973), better known by his stage names Buc Fifty, Bucwheed, and Buckwheat (of the Wascals), is an American rapper from New Rochelle, New York.

== Career ==
In 1989, he moved to Los Angeles and formed the rap group The Wascals. In 1992, he was featured on a track from 5150: Home 4 tha Sick by Eazy-E and two tracks from Bizarre Ride II the Pharcyde by The Pharcyde. In 1994, his group The Wascals released multiple singles with producer J-Swift, but their album was shelved.

From 1998 to 2001, he released multiple singles with producer The Alchemist. The two have an unreleased collaboration album titled Nigga Heaven, that was intended for release in 2001. In 1999, he made his first appearance on Battle Axe Records, on the compilation album Defenders of the Underworld.

In 2000, he appeared on a track from Soul Assassins II by Soul Assassins. Also in 2000, he was featured on four tracks from the compilation album Battle Axe Warriors. All four tracks appear on his debut album Bad Man, released in 2002 by Battle Axe Records. The album's title track, which samples Scarface and "Dream On" by Aerosmith, reached number 9 on Gavin Report's rap/hip-hop radio airplay chart, and number 7 on Hits Magazine's Rap Radio Top Thirty. He was featured twice on the 2001 album Bad Dreams by Swollen Members, and once on their 2002 album Monsters in the Closet.

In 2004, he released his second album, also on Battle Axe Records, titled Serve the Devil, Praise the Lord. In 2005, he released his third album Rethuglican with Delicious Vinyl, under the name Bucwheed. The album is produced entirely by J-Swift, along with The Wascals long-awaited album Greatest Hits, which released in 2007.

== Discography ==
=== Albums ===
- Bad Man (2002) (as Buc Fifty)
- Serve the Devil, Praise the Lord (2004) (as Buc Fifty)
- Rethuglican (2005) (as Bucwheed) (with J-Swift)
- Greatest Hits (2007) (as Buckweat of The Wascals) (with J-Swift)

=== Singles ===
as Buckwheat (of The Wascals)

- "Class Clown" (1994) (with J-Swift)
- "The Dips" (1994) (with J-Swift)

as Buc Fifty

- "Still Breathing/Dead End Street" (1998) (with The Alchemist)
- "Metal's Advocate" (1999) (with The Alchemist)
- "Bad Man" (2000)
- "Locked Down" (2001) (with The Alchemist)

as Bucwheed

- "Tattoos/No Dummy" (2002)
- "The Rethuglican/Kiss My Ass" (2003)

=== Guest appearances ===
as Buckwheat (of The Wascals)

- "Merry Muthafukkin' Xmas" from 5150: Home 4 tha Sick by Eazy-E (1992)
- "I'm That Type of Nigga" and "On the DL" from Bizarre Ride II the Pharcyde by The Pharcyde (1992)
- "Just Don't Matter" from Sold My Soul: The Remix & Rarity Collection by The Pharcyde (2005)

as Buc Fifty

- "Worst Enemy" from Defenders of the Underworld by Battle Axe Records (1999)
- "Lampin" from 4535: Epilogue by Sesh (2000)
- "Back Up Off Me" from Soul Assassins II by Soul Assassins (2000)
- "Go For Mine", "Puttin Check Down", "Still Getting Over" and "Planet Alignment" from Battle Axe Warriors by Battle Axe Records (2000)
- "Boy's About to Flip" and "Permanent Scars" from Lyrics of Fury by Battle Axe Records (2001)
- "Poker Face" and "Dark Riders" from Bad Dreams by Swollen Members (2001)
- "Heavy Thinkers" from Monsters in the Closet by Swollen Members (2002)
- "Bangin" from Battle Axe Warriors II by Battle Axe Records (2002)
- "Ni**a Heaven" from Search and Rescue by DJ Murge (2002)
- "War Paint" and "Under Street Lights" from Dirty by Mr. Brady (2003)

=== Music videos ===
- "Class Clown" (1994) (as Buckweat of The Wascals)
- "The Dips" (1994) (as Buckweat of The Wascals)
- "Dream and Imaginate" (1994) (as Buckweat of The Wascals) (with Fatlip)
- "Tattoos" (2002) (as Bucwheed)
- "Free Again" (2011) (as Buc Fifty) (with Dr. Zodiak)
