= Tom Grant (baseball) =

American baseball player (born 1957)

- Outfielder
- Born: May 28, 1957 (age 69); Worcester, Massachusetts, U.S.
- Batted: Left Threw: Right

MLB debut
- June 17, 1983, for the Chicago Cubs

Last MLB appearance
- October 2, 1983, for the Chicago Cubs

MLB statistics
- Games played: 16
- Batting average: .150
- Runs batted in: 2
- Stats at Baseball Reference

Teams
- Chicago Cubs (1983)

Thomas Raymond Grant (born May 28, 1957) is an American former Major League Baseball player who played for the Chicago Cubs in 1983. He was primarily used as an outfielder but was also used as a pinch hitter.

== Early life and education ==
Grant graduated from Nipmuc Regional High School in Upton, Massachusetts and then attended the University of New Haven.

While at the University of New Haven, Grant played on three NCAA College World Series teams and hit 26 home runs for UNH from 1976 until 1979. A power hitter, Grant helped take UNH to four NCAA postseason berths. and was inducted into the university's hall of fame in 1991.

In 1977, he played collegiate summer baseball with the Falmouth Commodores of the Cape Cod Baseball League, and returned to the league in 1978 with the Wareham Gatemen.

== Professional baseball career ==
Grant was signed by the Chicago Cubs on June 9, 1979 and made his major league debut on June 17, 1983, when the Cubs called him up from Iowa after Leon Durham suffered an injury and was placed on the disabled list. "He's earned the opportunity," Cubs manager Lee Elia said of Grant at the time. Grant was sent down to the minor leagues two weeks later but returned to the Cubs in September. In late September 1983, Grant collected his first major-league hit. In total, during his time with the Cubs in 1983, Grant had 20 major league at-bats and notching three hits.

In 1984, Grant returned to the minor leagues, playing a full season for the Cubs' AAA affiliate. He played again for Iowa in 1985. On July 26, 1985, the Cubs traded Grant to the Cleveland Indians for Dave Beard, and Grant was assigned to the Indians' AAA affiliate in Maine. He left baseball after the 1985 season.

== After baseball ==
Since 1999, Grant has worked for Covidien in Massachusetts as a director of accounting related to integrations.

== Personal life ==
Grant currently lives in Mendon, Massachusetts.
