= 1 More Hit =

- 1 More Hit poster
- Produced by: Shauna Garr
- Starring: J-Swift; Akon; Twink Caplan; Shauna Garr; Paul Mooney
- Distributed by: Smart Girl Productions, Gravitas Ventures
- Release date: March 11, 2007 (SXSW)
- Running time: 86 minutes
- Country: United States

1 More Hit is a documentary film by Shauna Garr. It follows the life of hip hop producer J-Swift, formerly of The Pharcyde, from homelessness and crack addiction to his mission to win back his life and music career. 1 More Hit premiered at the 2007 South by Southwest Festival. The documentary highlighted J-Swift's charismatic personality and fighting his addiction to rebuild his recording career.

In 2008, the festival version was nominated for a PRISM Award by the Entertainment Industries Council (EIC), in recognition of an outstanding contribution that demonstrates the entertainment industry's sincere efforts to accurately depict drug, alcohol and tobacco use and addiction. The filmmaker updated the documentary in 2011 when it was picked up for digital release by Gravitas Ventures. It released digitally over 16.5 million homes. The doc had its ON DEMAND premiere in January 2012 and is available on DVD through Smart Girl Productions.

Shauna Garr created a Kickstarter Campaign to raise funds for the post production works of the film.

As of 2021, the film is not widely available for streaming or purchase.

== Cast ==
All appearing as themselves.

- J-Swift
- Akon
- Twink Caplan
- Shauna Garr
- Paul Mooney
