= J-Swift =

American record producer

- Also known as: J-Swift; Negro Kanevil
- Born: Juan Manuel Martinez-Luis; December 27, 1971 (age 54); Madrid, Spain
- Origin: Los Angeles, California
- Genres: Hip-hop
- Occupation: Record producer
- Years active: 1988–present
- Label: Delicious Vinyl
- Formerly of: The Pharcyde; The Wascals

Juan Manuel Martinez-Luis (born December 27, 1971), better known by his stage name J-Swift, is a record producer credited for songs with groups on the Delicious Vinyl label, including The Pharcyde and The Wascals.

== Early life ==
J-Swift was born in 1971 in Madrid, Spain. His Afro-Cuban father, Pedro, was a salsa bandleader and multi-instrumentalist. His mother, Dolores, was a native of the Canary Islands. In 1974, the family headed to Los Angeles, California, settling in Inglewood. At age six, J-Swift enrolled in a piano conservatory, quickly proving to be a prodigy. The all-rap radio station KDAY introduced him to hip-hop in the early 1980s, and the first record he ever got was by Grandmaster Flash and the Furious Five.

== Career ==
Around 1988, J-Swift attended Locke High School, where he met his mentor R&B musician Reggie Andrews, producer of Dazz Band's 1982 funk hit "Let It Whip" and collaborator of Rick James. After J-Swift composed three new jack swing-style songs to get his attention, Andrews suggested that he concentrate on writing and producing, and set him up with a recording studio (complete with a then-state-of-the-art Akai MPC-60) at South Central Unit (SCU), an after-school program for disadvantaged young talent. This gave J the opportunity to submit songs to A&M Records' Rondor Music publishing, while additional work came via BMI's Cheryl Dickerson. Though much of this early music went unreleased (like an album by Bell Biv DeVoe spin-off STR8-Ahead), J-Swift's official songwriting/producing debut came in 1991 with Keisha Jackson's "Feel You Out."

Around this time J-Swift began making music with a crew of dancers-turned-rappers. With Reggie Andrews' record collection at their disposal, J-Swift and The Pharcyde crafted a three-song demo in '91 and subsequently a hip-hop classic, 1992's Bizarre Ride II the Pharcyde. Featuring the hit single "Passin' Me By", Pharcyde's debut went certified Gold. Disputes over production and credits caused a rift between J and the group (although they would later reunite on The Pharcyde's "Trust" remix in 2000, not to mention several J-Swift-produced tracks on Fatlip's 2005 solo debut The Loneliest Punk, and Fatlip and Tre Hardson's 2007 holiday song "All I Want for Xmas").

With his own "Fat House Productions" acts Jazzyfatnastees and Quinton, J-Swift signed an ill-fated million dollar deal with Tommy Boy Records in 1993. Another of his groups, The Wascals, dropped several singles including "Class Clown" and "The Dips" in '94, but broke up before releasing their debut. The crew was started by members Alfie and Buckwheat, the latter of which met J-Swift while they were going to high school together. The Wascals album Greatest Hits, produced by J-Swift, was finally released by Delicious Vinyl in 2007. In the mid-'90s, J-Swift lent his signature style to a string of remixes, including Prince's "Letitgo (Sherm Stick Edit)," Massive Attack's "Protection," and Urban Thermo Dynamics' "Manifest Destiny" (featuring a young Mos Def).

J-Swift was the subject of the 2007 documentary film 1 More Hit.

J-Swift recorded new tracks from 2005 through 2010, providing not only the beats but also the rhymes. Featuring soul-baring rap confessionals ("Off My Chest") and tales of perseverance through struggles ("Born To Win Despite Myself") — while still celebrating recreational drug use ("I'll Do Mine") — J-Swift's new project began with an alter ego Negro Kanevil.

== Personal life ==
In 2006, J-Swift was arrested for possession of narcotics. In 2015, his permanent resident status was stripped and he was deported back to his birth country of Spain.

== Production credits ==
- 1992 The Pharcyde - Bizarre Ride II the Pharcyde – Delicious Vinyl

Entire Album

- 1994 Quinton - Quinton's Here – Tommy Boy Records

1) "Quinton's on the Way (A Jazzy Skit)"
2) "Still Fiendin'"
3) "Quinton's Here"
4) "I'm Not an MC"
5) "Quinton's Here (Instrumental)"
6) "Ill Friend"

- 1994 Prince – "Letitgo" – Warner Bros. Records

6) "Letitgo (Sherm Stick Edit)"

- 1995 Urban Thermo Dynamics - "Manifest Destiny (single)" - Payday/ffrr Records

3) "Manifest Destiny (J-Swift Edit)"

- 1995 Massive Attack – "Protection" – Virgin Records

4) "Protection (J Swift Mix)"

- 2000 The Pharcyde – Trust – Delicious Vinyl

1) "Trust (Remix)"

- 2000 Various - Delicious Vinyl Presents... Prime Cuts Vol. 1

2) The Black Pack - "Used To Be My Lover"

- 2002 Buc Fifty - Bad Man – Battle Axe Records

4) "Gangster (Murderville)"
8) "Manifest Destiny"

- 2004 Buc Fifty - Serve The Devil, Praise The Lord - Battle Axe Records

1) "Live No More"
2) "Live by the Gun"
3) "No Tworries"
4) "Oh Christ"
6) "Say It Ain't So"
8) "The Hard Way"
9) "Jackers Delight"
10) "Ride With No Brakes"
12) "Feeling"
13) "My Money"

- 2005 Bucwheed - Rethuglican – Delicious Vinyl

Entire Album

- 2007 The Wascals - Greatest Hits – Delicious Vinyl

Entire Album
