= Dream On (Aerosmith song) =

1973 single by Aerosmith

- 1976 UK promotional single

Single by Aerosmith

from the album Aerosmith
- B-side: "Somebody"
- Released: June 27, 1973; January 1976 (re-release)
- Recorded: October 1972
- Studio: Intermedia, Boston
- Genre: Hard rock; blues rock
- Length: 3:25 (single version); 4:28 (album version)
- Label: Columbia
- Songwriter: Steven Tyler
- Producer: Adrian Barber

Aerosmith singles chronology
"Dream On" (1973)	"Same Old Song and Dance" (1974)

Audio sample
- file; help

Music videos
- "Dream On" (audio) on YouTube
- "Dream On" (official live video) on YouTube

"Dream On" is a song by the American rock band Aerosmith, from their 1973 eponymous debut album. A power ballad written by lead singer Steven Tyler, this song was their first major hit and became a classic rock radio staple. Released in June 1973, it peaked at number 59 on the Billboard Hot 100 but hit big in the band's native Boston, where it was the number one single of the year on WBZ-FM, number five for the year on WRKO and number 16 on WMEX (AM). The song also received immediate heavy airplay on the former WVBF (FM), often showing up in the #1 position on "The Top Five at Five" in June 1973.

The album version of "Dream On" (4:28, as opposed to the 3:25 1973 45 rpm edit where most of the intro has been edited out and the first chorus is replaced with the second chorus) was re-issued in late 1975, debuting at number 81 on the Billboard Hot 100 chart on January 10, 1976, breaking into the top 40 on February 14 and peaking at number 6 on April 10. Columbia Records chose to service top 40 radio stations with both long and short versions of the song, thus many 1976 pop radio listeners were exposed to the group's first top 10 effort through the 45 edit.

In 2004, Rolling Stone magazine ranked the song at number 172 on its list of the 500 Greatest Songs of All Time. It was moved to number 173 in 2010, and re-ranked at number 199 in 2021. In 2007, Aerosmith would perform a re-recording of the song, among some of their other songs, for the game Guitar Hero: Aerosmith as the master track was missing during the game's development. In 2018, the song was inducted into the Grammy Hall of Fame. On November 29, 2023, the song surpassed one billion streams on Spotify.

== Background ==
In a 2011 interview, Tyler reminisced about his father, a Juilliard-trained musician. He recalled lying beneath his dad's piano as a three-year-old listening to him play classical music. "That's where I got that Dream On chordage", he said. Lyrical composition was completed when Tyler was 14 years old. The song is also famous for its building climax to showcase Tyler's trademark screams.

In the authorized Stephen Davis band memoir Walk This Way, Tyler speaks at length about the origins of the songs:

The music for 'Dream On' was originally written on a Steinway upright piano in the living room of Trow-Rico Lodge in Sunapee, maybe four years before Aerosmith even started. I was seventeen or eighteen. ... It was just this little thing I was playing, and I never dreamed it would end up as a real song or anything. ... It's about dreaming until your dreams come true.

== Reception ==
Record World called it a "beauty which features strange melodic line and tight hard rock accompaniment" in 1973. Then in 1975, Cash Box said that "the hard surface is there but Tyler's plaintive vocals and some economical muscular riffing make 'Dream On' a thinker as well as a mover."

Upon the re-release of the single, Billboard listed it in its "Recommended LPs" section on January 3, 1976.

In a later review, Stephen Thomas Erlewine commented about the song for AllMusic: "There was nothing quite like it in 1973, and it remains the blueprint for all power ballads since."

== Legacy ==
=== Live performances ===
"Dream On (Live)"

Single by Aerosmith

from the album Last Action Hero: Music from the Original Motion Picture
- Released: June 8, 1993
- Recorded: June 6, 1991
- Venue: MTV 10th Anniversary Special
- Genre: Symphonic rock
- Length: 5:42
- Label: Columbia Records
- Songwriter: Steven Tyler

A concert staple, the song's piano part has been played live by Tyler. The band has also played "Dream On" with an orchestra on occasion. One of these performances, conducted by Michael Kamen, was performed live for MTV's 10th Anniversary (in 1991) and included on the soundtrack for the film Last Action Hero.

On September 19, 2006, Aerosmith dedicated the song to captured Israeli soldier Ehud Goldwasser. On September 22, 2007, at a concert in Atlantic City, New Jersey, Aerosmith dedicated the song to one of their fans, Monica Massaro, who had been murdered earlier that year. On May 25, 2011, Tyler performed a brief rendition of the song live during the finale of the tenth season of American Idol.

In 2006, Tyler and Joe Perry performed the song live with the Boston Pops Orchestra at their Fourth of July spectacular. In August 2010, Tyler performed much of the song on a grand piano on top of the Green Monster at an Aerosmith concert at Boston's Fenway Park, joined by the rest of the band to close out the song. After the Boston Marathon bombing, Tyler performed the song at the Boston Strong concert in late May 2013. In 2014, Tyler, Slash and Train performed the song for Howard Stern's 60th Birthday Bash.

In 2022, at rapper Eminem's Rock and Roll Hall of Fame induction concert, Tyler performed the introductory line and the chorus to "Dream On" alongside Eminem as he performed his 2002 hit "Sing for the Moment", which uses the former's chorus as its chorus.

=== Appearances on other albums ===
The song has appeared on almost every Aerosmith greatest hits and live compilation, including:

- Live! Bootleg
- Greatest Hits
- Classics Live I
- A Little South of Sanity
- Big Ones (as a bonus track on CD 2)
- Young Lust: The Aerosmith Anthology
- O, Yeah! Ultimate Aerosmith Hits
- Devil's Got a New Disguise
- Music from the Original Motion Picture "Last Action Hero"

It also appears on both of the band's box sets.

=== Other ===
In 2000, the song was sampled for the single "Bad Man" by American rapper Buc Fifty. It was the title track of his 2002 debut album.

In 2002, the song was sampled by American rapper Eminem for the song "Sing for the Moment", from his 2002 album The Eminem Show. Joe Perry played the guitar solo on the track and the chorus features Steven Tyler singing, with Eminem adding "sing", "sing with me" and "come on" in the refrain as well.

In 2022, "Dream On" experienced a resurgence in popularity on social media following its usage in a meme of a cutscene from God of War wherein the main character, Kratos, falls off Mount Olympus while the song's chorus plays; the song subsequently rose up to 720 million streams on Spotify.

== Personnel ==
- Steven Tyler – vocals, keyboards
- Joe Perry – lead guitar
- Brad Whitford – rhythm guitar
- Tom Hamilton – bass guitar
- Joey Kramer – drums

== Charts ==
=== Weekly charts ===
Chart (1973)	Peak position
Canada RPM Top 100	87
US Billboard Hot 100	59

1976 weekly chart performance for "Dream On"
Chart (1976)	Peak position
Canada RPM Top 100	10
US Billboard Hot 100	6
Netherlands (Single Tip)	17

Chart (1994)	Peak position
Netherlands (Dutch Top 40)	12
Netherlands (Single Top 100)	14

Chart (2022–2024)	Peak position
Czech Republic Singles Digital (ČNS IFPI)	39
France (SNEP)	200
Global 200 (Billboard)	110
Hungary (Single Top 40)	30
Lithuania (AGATA)	75
Slovakia (Singles Digitál Top 100)	47
Sweden Heatseeker (Sverigetopplistan)	5
Ukraine Airplay (TopHit)	63

=== Year-end charts ===
Chart (1976)	Rank
Canada RPM Top 100	107
US Billboard Hot 100	51

Chart (1994)	Position
Netherlands (Dutch Top 40)	97

== Certifications ==
Certifications for "Dream On"
Region	Certification	Certified units/sales
Denmark (IFPI Danmark)	Gold	45,000^{‡}
Germany (BVMI)	Gold	250,000^{‡}
Italy (FIMI)	Platinum	50,000^{‡}
New Zealand (RMNZ)	3× Platinum	90,000^{‡}
Spain (Promusicae)	Platinum	60,000^{‡}
United Kingdom (BPI)	Platinum	600,000^{‡}
United States (RIAA)	4× Platinum	4,000,000^{‡}
Streaming
Greece (IFPI Greece)	Gold	1,000,000^{†}
^{‡} Sales+streaming figures based on certification alone.^{†} Streaming-only figures based on certification alone.
