= Al Shearer =

American actor

- Born: August 14, 1977 (age 48); Columbus, Ohio, United States
- Other name: Hits
- Spouse: Niresha Kalaichelvam

Al Shearer (born August 14, 1977) is an American actor. He portrayed Nevil Shed in the 2006 Disney blockbuster Glory Road, produced by Jerry Bruckheimer. Shearer might be best known for his role on the MTV series Punk'd, or as "Hits" - host of the once-popular BET series Hits from the Street.

Shearer was born in Columbus, Ohio. Hits began his humble career at BET as the host of a show titled, "Game Room." Later, he honed his skills in front of the camera as the DC correspondent for the award-winning teen show, Teen Summit. He would then go on to host a morning hip-hop show at WPGC-FM/AM (CBS Radio) in Washington, D.C. However, it is his 'you so crazy' personality that draws attention to his very candid, yet comedic, persona which he portrays easily on as well as off camera. Hits has also been featured in a Reebok commercial with 2000 NBA rookie of the year, Steve Francis.

Hits earned a B.A. in Broadcast Journalism from Howard University and presently resides in the Los Angeles area. He was the host of the BET prank show, Played by Fame.

He is also married to Model and Actress Niresha Kalaichelvam.

== Filmography ==
Year	Title	Role
2019	How High 2	I Need Money
2019	Kevin Hart's Guide to Black History	Robert Smalls
2018	A Stone Cold Christmas	Al The Security Guard
2017	Face Value	Team Captain
2015	Black Jesus	Mike
2014	Family Time	Himself
2014	According to Him + Her	Reenactment
2012	Al Shearer: The Other Black Guy Running for President in 2012	himself
2012	Belizean James: No Gold Anything	Himself
2012	GGN: Snoop Dogg's Double G Network	Hits From the Street
2008	The Hustle	Freddy
2008	Black Poker Stars Invitational	Himself
2008	CSI: Crime Scene Investigation	Dale D
2006	Glory Road	Nevil Shed
2005	Who's Your Daddy? (TV)	Ray/Fake Dad
2003	Honey	Bar Customer
2003	Total Request Live	Himself
2003	Punk'd	Undercover Agent/Under Cover Agent/UnderCover Agent/Ashton's 'assistant'
2003	Urban Killas: Blood Billz	D
2001	How High	I Need Money
2000	Hits from the Street	Hits
