= Shauna Garr =

American producer and entertainment executive

- Born: Los Angeles, United States
- Occupations: Producer, Entertainment Executive
- Known for: Producing How High film franchise, How High 2
- Notable work: Method And Red, The Ride, The Strip Game, 1 More Hit

Shauna Garr is an American producer and entertainment executive in Hollywood. She is best known for producing the film franchise How High and How High 2 with Universal Pictures.

== Biography ==
Garr was born in Los Angeles. She is best known for producing the film franchise How High and How High 2 with Universal Pictures, which originally starred Method Man, Lark Voorhies and Mike Epps. Garr also produced the Fox TV series Method And Red. She began her career with Merv Griffin Enterprises at Wheel of Fortune.

Garr was a producer for MTV News in the 1990s. Segueing next to PBS, Garr executive produced the 8-part docu-soap series "The Ride". This series was a critical success and introduced a teen Paula Patton. Garr later joined the Disney Company's Buena Vista Television discovering writers for Keenen Ivory Wayans' late-night talk show and developing other alternative programming.

Garr also worked as vice-president of development for filmmaker Amy Heckerling at Paramount Television. During this stint she is best known for setting afloat the career of CSI: Crime Scene Investigation producer and screenwriter Dustin Lee Abraham.

In 2005, she produced the documentary film The Strip Game for Lions Gate Entertainment, starring Method Man, Travis Barker and Ghostface Killah. In 2010, Lions Gate Entertainment re-released the film virally and it is ranked as one of the most popular documentaries by Hulu. Garr's South by Southwest documentary film 1 More Hit, was released on DVD, and then as a VOD January 19, 2012.

As a producer in 2012, Garr discovered Lil Rel Howery and Jermaine Fowler for an In Living Color reboot.

In 2018, Garr returned to executive-produce How High 2 for Universal 1440 Entertainment and MTV. How High 2 aired Saturday, April 20, 2019, on MTV, giving the network its highest-rated Saturday in six years, according to MTV and Nielsen ratings.

== Production and talent management company ==
Garr is known for managing actor/music performer Method Man. On May 20, 2021, it was announced that she and Method Man formed a production company named Six AM.
