= Battle Axe Warriors =

Compilation album by Various Artists
- Released: November 14, 2000
- Genre: Hip-hop
- Length: 61:31
- Label: Battle Axe Records
- Producers: Rob the Viking; Ralph M; Sichuan; Evidence; Paul Nice; Mechanic; DJ Seanski; Madlib; Mr. Brady; Moka Only; Mum's the Word

Singles from Battle Axe Warriors
- 1. "Single Number 1" Released: 2000; 2. "Single Number 2" Released: 2000

Professional ratings
Review scores
| Source | Rating |
|---|---|
| AllMusic | 3/5 stars |
| Chronic'art | 3/5 |
| Exclaim! | (positive) |
| HipHopCore | 4/5 stars |
| RapManiacz | 4/5 |
| UGS Magazine | 3.5/5 |

Battle Axe Warriors is a compilation album released by Battle Axe Records on November 14, 2000.

== Track listing ==
| No. | Title | Producer | Length |
|---|---|---|---|
| 1. | "Go For Mine" (performed by Madchild, Buc Fifty and Kutfather) | Rob the Viking | 4:30 |
| 2. | "Puttin' Check Down" (performed by Buc Fifty) | Ralph M | 3:56 |
| 3. | "Let My Record Rotate" (performed by Mr. Brady) | Rob the Viking | 2:54 |
| 4. | "Team Work" (performed by Moka Only and LMNO) | Sichuan | 4:07 |
| 5. | "Camouflage" (performed by Swollen Members) | Evidence | 2:34 |
| 6. | "Still Getting Over" (performed by Buc Fifty) | Rob the Viking | 3:34 |
| 7. | "Summer Lightning" (performed by Mr. Brady and Swollen Members) | Rob the Viking | 3:31 |
| 8. | "Rolling Along" (performed by Moka Only and Abstract Rude) | Paul Nice | 5:19 |
| 9. | "Elbow Room" (performed by LMNO) | Mechanic | 4:03 |
| 10. | "Deep End" (performed by Swollen Members) | DJ Seanski | 3:33 |
| 11. | "Head Lock" (performed by LMNO and Madlib) | Madlib | 4:33 |
| 12. | "Planet Alignment" (performed by Buc Fifty, Freestyle and Swollen Members) | Rob the Viking | 3:20 |
| 13. | "Mud Slide" (performed by Mr. Brady) | Mr. Brady | 3:11 |
| 14. | "Dawn Light" (performed by Moka Only) | Moka Only | 2:52 |
| 15. | "Proper Reaction" (performed by LMNO and Madchild) | Rob the Viking | 3:15 |
| 16. | "Crunch" (performed by Moka Only and Swollen Members) | Paul Nice | 2:44 |
| 17. | "Street Wise" (performed by LMNO) | Mum's the Word | 3:35 |
| Total length: | | | 61:31 |
