= Live Texxas Jam '78 =

Video by Aerosmith
- Released: April 25, 1989
- Recorded: July 1, 1978
- Genre: Hard rock
- Length: 50 mins
- Label: CBS/Fox Video
- Director: Hart Perry
- Producers: David Krebs and Steven Leber

Aerosmith chronology
Permanent Vacation 3x5 (1988)	Live Texxas Jam '78 (1989)	Things That Go Pump in the Night (1990)

Professional ratings
Review scores
Source	Rating
Allmusic	link
Uncut	1/5 stars

Live Texxas Jam '78 is a live VHS and LaserDisc video by the American hard rock band Aerosmith. It was filmed on the 4th of July weekend at the Cotton Bowl in Dallas where Aerosmith headlined the Texxas World Music Festival. It was released on April 25, 1989. Although not included on the video, the live versions for "Big Ten Inch Record" and "Lord of the Thighs" would later be included on the limited Japanese edition of Just Push Play and on the Pandora's Box box set.

As of October 2018, this is yet to be released on either DVD or Blu-Ray formats.

== Track listing ==
1. "Rats in the Cellar"
2. "Seasons of Wither"
3. "I Wanna Know Why" *
4. "Walkin' the Dog"
5. "Walk This Way"
6. "Lick and a Promise"
7. "Get The Lead Out"
8. "Draw the Line"
9. "Sweet Emotion"
10. "Same Old Song and Dance"
11. "Milk Cow Blues"
12. "Toys in the Attic"

== Personnel ==
- Tom Hamilton
- Joey Kramer
- Joe Perry
- Steven Tyler
- Brad Whitford
- Mark Radice

== Certifications ==
Region	Certification	Certified units/sales
United States (RIAA)	Gold	50,000^{^}
^{^} Shipments figures based on certification alone.
