= Venus Brown =

American music executive

Venus Brown (real name Darren Floyd, born in San Diego, California) is the executive producer, owner and CEO of Buddah Brown Entertainment, an artist management music label.

== Beginnings ==
Brown began working in the music industry in the late 1980s hosting his own radio show on WKYS in Washington D.C. Brown's radio show later led to an internship at the Black Entertainment Television (BET) D.C. headquarters working in the fields of television production and talent coordination. The internship allowed Brown to write for the BET program Video Soul, where he met R&B artist Patti LaBelle. Brown went on to write and co-produce the Big Daddy Kane and Patti LaBelle's Grammy winning hit, "Feels Like Another One".

In 1998 Brown was signed to D'Angelo's music label, Cheeba Music/Virgin. After the release of Nikka Costa's Everybody Got Their Something and D'Angelo's Voodoo, Cheeba Music was eventually dropped from its parent label, Virgin Records. Tar Baby, Brown's debut album, was eventually released on Boulevard Connection Records out of Copenhagen, Denmark, in June 2001.

In 2000 Brown became the musical director for Nikka Costa and toured with Nikka for three years. He also served as the first musical director for Mark Ronson.

In 2002 Brown became the president and general manager of will.i.am music group. In that capacity, he oversaw the production and executive produced multi-platinum albums for The Black Eyed Peas, Fergie and Macy Gray. During this time he and will.i.am executive produced the critically acclaimed "Timeless" album for Brazilian piano virtuoso, Sergio Mendes. "Timeless" featured a wide range of superstar guest performers including Justin Timberlake, Stevie Wonder, India.Arie, Q-Tip, Jill Scott, Mr. Vegas and John Legend to name a few. Timeless spawned the hit singles "That Heat" featuring Erykah Badu and the second single, "Mas Que Nada" featuring The Black Eyed Peas. That song went on to be the theme song for the Brazilian national soccer team during the 2006 World Cup in Germany.

Brown launched Buddah Brown Entertainment to serve as a record label to release new product, and the first artists that were slated to be released in 2009 were hip hop-R&B duo Ty & Kory, Lyssii (from MTV's Daddy's Girls"). In 2009 Brown signed a multi-year deal to be the international music producer of the High Fashion meets Rock & Roll live television special Fashion Rocks in Rio de Janeiro. The first Brazilian installment of the series included P.Diddy performing for Donatella Versace, Grace Jones performing with Marc Jacobs, Ciara performing with Givenchy and Mariah Carey performing with Calvin Klein, to name a few.

In 2010 Venus entered a partnership with BMG as part of their senior executive roster. Through this union Venus initiated an innovative Producer Management division, 3B, providing a new service catering to managing careers of music producers and the administration of their producer income. He also collaborated with Jason Herbert to create a Brazilian boyband P9 who released their debut album in July 2013 by Sony Music.
