= Aerosmith (album) =

1973 studio album by Aerosmith

Studio album by Aerosmith
- Released: January 5, 1973
- Recorded: October 1972
- Studio: Intermedia (Boston)
- Genres: Hard rock; blues rock
- Length: 35:48
- Label: Columbia
- Producer: Adrian Barber

Aerosmith chronology
Aerosmith (1973)	Get Your Wings (1974)

Singles from Aerosmith
- 1. "Dream On" Released: June 27, 1973

Alternative cover
- Second pressing

Aerosmith (sometimes erroneously referred to as Make It after the album's first track) is the debut studio album by the American rock band Aerosmith, released on January 5, 1973, by Columbia Records. "Dream On", originally released as a single in 1973, became an American top ten hit when re-released on December 27, 1975. The album peaked at number 21 on the US Billboard 200 album chart in 1976.

== Background ==
After entering a partnership with Frank Connelly, David Krebs and Steve Leber invited members of two record labels – Atlantic Records and Columbia Records – to view an Aerosmith concert at Max's Kansas City. Clive Davis, the president of Columbia, was impressed with the band and Aerosmith signed with Columbia in the summer of 1972.

Although lead singer Steven Tyler had been in several previous groups, most of the band members had never been in a studio before. The band was heavily influenced by many of the British blues/rock bands of the 1960s, including the Rolling Stones, the Beatles, Led Zeppelin, the Yardbirds, and Peter Green's Fleetwood Mac.

== Composition ==
The album's songs were largely written by Tyler, as, at that stage, the other band members were not interested. Tyler explained in a 1998 interview that he had written "Dream On" three or four years earlier, but had not felt confident with the result; but he decided he could write songs after going through the writing process for the album, during which he would write during the night, and then wake the rest of the band in the morning to play the songs to them on the piano."

"Make It" leads off the album and also served as the band's opening song during their first tours. Tyler wrote the song on the back of a Kleenex box in the back seat of the car as the group drove down from New Hampshire to Boston to move in together to start the band. Tyler was inspired both by the sudden view of the city through the windshield and the possibilities that starting the new band presented. He explains to biographer Stephen Davis, "I wrote 'Make It' in a car driving from New Hampshire to Boston. There's that hill you come to and see the skyline of Boston, and I was sitting in the backseat thinking, What would be the greatest thing to sing for an audience if we were opening up for the ... Stones? What would the lyrics say?" Drummer Kramer elaborates on the song's sentiment in a 1998 interview: "You could search the ends of the earth, and I don't think you could find five more different guys. The one thing that we all had in common was that we all wanted to make it. And making it back then had nothing to do with being rich and famous. It had to do with being recognized, by your peers and people, for being a great band and being able to play concerts where a lot of people would come."

"Somebody" dates from Tyler's previous band, Chain Reaction. Tyler explains, "'Somebody' grew out of a lick that our roadie Steve Emsback used to play on his guitar during the days of William Proud. I grabbed it and wrote the lyrics." The music was also influenced by the Rolling Stones' version of "Route 66", which the band would use to rehearse to tighten up their playing. Tyler explains, "Back when we were a nothing band, we'd get into rehearsals at Boston University in the basement, and we would do things like play 'Route 66' and keep rehearsing it. I'd say, 'Let's grab that one piece in there' [hums the bridge]. We did and came up with 'Somebody'." Tyler continues in his memoir: "'Route 66' was our Stones mantra, a way of finding our groove. It was the riff I asked the band to play again and again in the basement of BU to show them what tight playing meant. We played it so many times it eventually morphed into the melody for 'Somebody' on our first album."

Tyler wrote "Dream On" in stages over several years, finalizing the lyrics during the album's sessions. He explains, "The music for 'Dream On' was originally written on a Steinway upright piano in the living room of Trow-Rico Lodge in Sunapee, maybe four years before Aerosmith even started. I was seventeen or eighteen ... It was just this little thing I was playing, and I never dreamed it would end up as a real song or anything ... It's about dreaming until your dreams come true." The song is famous for its building climax to showcase Tyler's trademark screams. It was written on piano but the recording contains a two-guitar arrangement, with guitarist Brad Whitford explaining to Guitar World's Alan Di Perna in 1997, "The idea was just to transcribe what Steven was doing with his left and right hands on the piano." Explains Tyler, "Never in a million years did I think I'd take it to guitar. When I transposed it to guitar Joe played the right fingers and Brad played the left hand on guitar. Sitting there working it out on guitar and piano I got a little melodramatic. The song was so good it brought a tear to my eye." The song is composed in the key of F minor.

"One Way Street" was inspired by one of Tyler's relationships at the time. He explains, "'One Way Street' was written on piano at 1325 [the street number of the house where the band lived], with rhythm and the harp coming from 'Midnight Rambler.'"

"Mama Kin" was written on the same guitar found in the trash that Tyler later used to write "Seasons of Wither". He explains, "One day I grabbed this old guitar Joey Kramer found in the garbage on Beacon Street, an acoustic with no strings. It had snow on it and was so warped you could shoot arrows with it. I wedged it between the door and let it dry for a week. I looked at it for about two days, put four strings on it, which was all it would take because it was so warped ... I stole the opening lick from an old Blodwyn Pig song, "See My Way." In a 2001 interview, Tyler explains the song's lyrics: "People always ask, 'What's "mama kin"?' It's the mother of everything. It's the desire to write music, the desire to get laid, to go through the relationship with a girl, or whatever it is. Keeping in touch with mama kin means keeping in touch with the old spirits that got you there to begin with."

Tyler explains that "'Write Me' was originally 'Bite Me,' something we'd been working on for five or six months starting in the Bruins' dressing room at the Boston Garden, but it just didn't make it. Then one day I said, 'Fuck this,' said something to Joey, who started playing like a can-can rhythm thing, and suddenly there it was." The intro was inspired by "Got to Get You into My Life" by the Beatles.

Tyler considers "Movin' Out" to be the "first song of Aerosmith." He explains, "'Movin' Out' was the first song I wrote with Joe, the first experience of coming up with something and saying, 'See? I can do it.'" In his memoir, Tyler remembers writing the song with Perry sitting on a waterbed at their apartment: "One day at the very beginning of 1971 I wrote the basic track and lyrics for "Movin' Out" on a water bed with Joe Perry in our living room at 1325 Com. Ave. Joe's sitting on the water bed and I hear him strumming this thing and I go, 'Hold on...whoa, what's that?' and a minute later, Joe's riffing and I'm scribbling. I leaped up and shouted, 'Guys! Do you realize what we just did?' Their enthusiasm was curbed. 'Yeah, what is it, man?' 'It's our firstborn!' I proclaimed. 'The first Aerosmithed song! How great is that?'"

The album concludes with a cover of Rufus Thomas' "Walkin' the Dog", a concert staple of the band which they learned from the Rolling Stones cover. It was used in place of an original psychedelic pop song, "Major Barbara".

== Recording ==
The group recorded their debut album at Intermedia Studios in 331 Newbury Street, Boston, Massachusetts with record producer Adrian Barber. For the most part, the production is sparse and dry: two guitars, bass, drums, a singer, and occasionally piano. The most unusual feature of the album is how different Tyler sounds compared to the albums that followed. In his autobiography Tyler recalls, "The band was very uptight. We were so nervous that when the red recording light came on we froze. We were scared shitless. I changed my voice into the Muppet, Kermit the Frog, to sound more like a blues singer." He continues in a 1998 interview, "I didn't like the way I sang. I was very critical about sounding like a white boy in the choir." In 1997 the singer told Stephen Davis, "I changed my voice when we did the final vocals. I didn't like my voice, the way it sounded. I was insecure, but nobody told me not to."

The band recalls the production of the album and their working relationship with producer Adrian Barber with mixed sentiment. Tyler suggests that producer Barber was "good for his time" but it was like "being with a retarded child in there, and I'm not sure if it was because he was so high, or because we all were." In his autobiography Rocks, Joe Perry is more critical of Barber:

Our producer was practically useless. He had little input. When I heard the playback, I kept thinking, "We're better than this. We should sound better than this. We're being recorded wrong. We sound fuckin' flat." But because I lacked the studio chops to prescribe a remedy, I kept quiet. It pained me, though, that my guitar was not cutting through ... There's magic on it, but just not the magic that I had envisioned.

Bassist Tom Hamilton later confessed, "The album was done so fast I barely remember anything but overdubbing some tracks and running to the bathroom for a hit of blow". Perry reflected, "We were uptight, afraid to make mistakes ... We were total novices with no idea what to go for."

== Album cover ==
On the original cover, the song "Walkin' the Dog" was misprinted as "Walkin' the Dig". When a second pressing of the album was released, this error was corrected. Sometime after June 1973, but before January 1975, a third cover was printed. This has a modified version of the original, made up entirely of the photo of the band members, adding the 'Featuring "Dream On"' text and removing the biography information on the back. This third pressing is the more commonly available version of the LP. Cash Box magazine lists an Aerosmith II (Columbia KC 32045) release in the February 1, 1975, issue. As this catalog number is consistent with a June 1973 date, it is possible Columbia used this number to identify the 'Featuring "Dream On"' cover, but stayed with the original KC 32005 catalog number on the actual release. In January 1975, Aerosmith was re-issued with the "PC" prefix, so there may have been some confusion as to the correct number. When reissued on CD in 1993 as a remastered version, the original artwork was used.

Recalling the album art, Perry commented in 2014, "Unfortunately the packaging was lame. We didn't even see the cover until the first printing. It was something that Columbia just threw together ... The whole thing was sloppy. It marked the start of our education in dealing with labels."

== Promotion ==
"Dream On" was released as a single and became Aerosmith's first major hit and a classic rock radio staple. The single peaked at number 59 nationally but hit big in the band's native Boston, where it was the number 1 single of the year on the less commercial top 40 station, WVBZ-FM, number 5 for the year on highly rated Top 40 WRKO-AM, and number 16 on heritage Top 40 WMEX-AM.

The album version of "Dream On" (4:28, as opposed to the 3:25 1973 45rpm edit) was re-issued late in 1975, debuting at number 81 on January 10, 1976, breaking into the Top 40 on February 14 and peaking at number 6 on the Billboard Hot 100 national chart on April 10. Columbia chose to service Top 40 radio stations with a re-issue of the 3:25 edited version, thus, many 1976 Pop Radio listeners were exposed to the group's first Top 10 effort through the 45 edit.

In 1973, Aerosmith toured extensively behind the album, playing clubs in New England as well as larger venues throughout the eastern United States, opening for other groups including Mott the Hoople, Mahavishnu Orchestra, and The Kinks. The jazz fusion, almost classical style of Mahavishnu Orchestra proved to be an idiosyncratic fit. Joe Perry explains, "After us, John McLaughlin would ask for a moment of silence. I guess he figured they needed it." (Apparently, Perry was unaware that McLaughlin opened virtually all concerts prior to 1975 with that request.) The band's managers would book the band to open for groups that were waning in popularity, so that Aerosmith would have a chance to steal their audience. Manager David Krebs explains, "We learned to play our market so that Aerosmith opened for acts that were slightly on the downslide – bands whose audience we could cop. Even if we didn't blow them off the stage every time, we could at least count on some to buy an Aerosmith album." Tom Hamilton explains, "I think what we wanted to do, without ever really saying it, was to be the American equivalent of all the great British bands like Cream, the Yardbirds and Led Zeppelin. They were all so classy and powerful sounding. We couldn't think of an American band like that. We wanted to be the first one." Steven Tyler continues, "We were the guys you could actually see. It wasn't like Zeppelin was out there on the road in America all the time, the Stones weren't always coming to your town. We were America's band — the garage band that made it real big, the ultimate party band."

During the year, the group played sets featuring the new album for two different radio broadcasts and made their first television appearance. Both radio performances were professionally recorded. In March, WBCN Boston DJ Maxanne Sartori, who would promote the group through frequent playing of "Dream On", invited the group to broadcast their set from Paul's Mall in Boston. Two tracks from the performance would later be released on 1978's Live! Bootleg. In September, the group would perform a set at Counterpart Studios in the Cheviot neighborhood of Cincinnati, Ohio for WKRQ. Two tracks from this performance would see release in 1991 on Pandora's Box. In December, the group appeared on American Bandstand to perform "Dream On".

== Reception ==
Professional ratings
Review scores
Source	Rating
AllMusic	3.5/5 stars
Collector's Guide to Heavy Metal	7/10
The Daily Vault	A−
The Encyclopedia of Popular Music	3/5 stars
The Rolling Stone Album Guide	4/5 stars
Uncut	2/5 stars

The album was not a success when it was released on January 5, 1973. To the band's disappointment, it was not reviewed in Rolling Stone. Moreover, Columbia released Aerosmith at the same time as Bruce Springsteen's debut album, Greetings from Asbury Park, N.J., for which they made a greater promotional effort. Critics compared the band unfavorably to the Rolling Stones and the New York Dolls. In a 1998 interview, bassist Tom Hamilton recalls a lukewarm reception from radio stations toward the album, with a general response that the band were "a Kmart version of the Stones", so the band were told that unless the next album was better, they would be dropped by the record company.

In a modern review for AllMusic, Stephen Thomas Erlewine described Aerosmith as "truly an American band, sounding as though they were the best bar band in your local town, cranking out nasty hard-edged rock"; he considered "Dream On" "the blueprint for all power ballads" and the album a worthy debut where the band's "sleazoid blues-rock" sound is fully present but not yet perfected as in the next album. Canadian journalist Martin Popoff described the album as "raw, dirty and steeped with squalid integrity", but observed that "every successive release sounds light years ahead in terms of production, songcraft, maturity, everything".

In an interview to Classic Rock magazine, Guns N' Roses guitarist Izzy Stradlin recalled: "Growing up in Indiana, I loved fucking Aerosmith, man ... Smoke a joint, listen to the first record." Aerosmith was considered a big influence on Guns N' Roses and helped shape their sound. Lead guitarist Slash also expressed fondness for the album, saying that it was "underrated" and featured great playing but didn't get the attention it deserved due to its relatively low production values compared to other rock records of the time.

== Track listing ==
=== Side One ===
All tracks are written by Steven Tyler, except where noted.

No.	Title	Writer(s)	Length
1.	"Make It"		3:41
2.	"Somebody"	Tyler, Steven Emspak	3:45
3.	"Dream On"		4:28
4.	"One Way Street"		7:00

=== Side Two ===
No.	Title	Writer(s)	Length
1.	"Mama Kin"		4:25
2.	"Write Me a Letter"		4:11
3.	"Movin' Out"	Tyler, Joe Perry	5:03
4.	"Walkin' the Dog"	Rufus Thomas	3:12
Total length:			35:48

== Personnel ==
Personnel taken from Aerosmith liner notes.

=== Aerosmith ===
- Steven Tyler – lead vocals, keyboards, harmonica, wood flute
- Joe Perry – lead guitar, backing vocals
- Brad Whitford – rhythm guitar
- Tom Hamilton – bass
- Joey Kramer – drums

=== Additional musicians ===
- David Woodford – saxophone on "Mama Kin"

=== Production ===
- Adrian Barber – production, engineering
- Buddy Verga – production assistant
- Caryl Wienstock – engineering
- Bob Stoughton – assistant engineer

== Charts ==
1973 weekly chart performance for Aerosmith
Chart (1973)	Peak position
US Billboard 200	166

1976 weekly chart performance for Aerosmith
Chart (1976)	Peak position
Canada Top Albums/CDs (RPM)	58
US Billboard 200	21

2026 weekly chart performance for Aerosmith
Chart (2026)	Peak position
Belgian Albums (Ultratop Flanders)	161
Belgian Albums (Ultratop Wallonia)	166
German Albums (Offizielle Top 100)	89
Scottish Albums (Official Charts)	15
UK Albums Sales (OCC)	22

== Certifications ==
Certifications for Aerosmith
Region	Certification	Certified units/sales
Canada (Music Canada)	Platinum	100,000^{^}
United States (RIAA)	2× Platinum	2,000,000^{^}
^{^} Shipments figures based on certification alone.
