= Adrian Barber =

English musician (1938–2020)

Adrian Barber (13 November 1938 – 8 August 2020) was an English musician and producer most noted for recording the Beatles Live! at the Star-Club in Hamburg, Germany; 1962, producing the Allman Brothers Band's self-titled debut album, along with the Velvet Underground's album Loaded.

== Musician and electronics ==
Barber was the lead guitarist in Liverpool's quartet 'Cass and the Casanovas' (led by Brian "Cass" Cassar) and its subsequent 'the Big Three'. Also an electronic wizard, he was responsible for upgrading the group amps (called "coffins") but also upgrading other Liverpudlian's gear. This included Paul McCartney's quad amp. He left the Big Three in mid-1962, when the band planned to be a quartet. Barber played drums on The Velvet Underground's 1970 song "Who Loves the Sun".

== Sound stage manager ==
In 1962, due to his knowledge in the electronic field, Barber was hired by Horst Fascher to improve the Star-Club's Sound system. In late December 1962, he recorded bands performing and some of his tapes were released as Live! at the Star-Club in Hamburg, Germany; 1962.

== Producer and sound engineer ==
In the late 1960s, Barber became a recording engineer/producer for Atlantic Records, for instance on...

- 1967 Aretha Franklin - I Never Loved a Man the Way I Love You
- 1968 Aretha Franklin - Aretha Now
- 1968 Buffalo Springfield - Last Time Around
- 1969 Velvet Underground - Loaded (also drumming on 2 tracks)
- 1969 The Rascals - Freedom Suite
- 1969 The Rascals - See
- 1969 Bee Gees - Odessa
- 1969 Cream - Goodbye
- 1969 Allman Brothers Band - The Allman Brothers Band
- 1969 Aretha Franklin - Lady Soul
- 1971 Aretha Franklin - Aretha's Greatest Hits
- 1973 Aerosmith - Aerosmith

== Death ==
He died from COVID-19, spending the rest of his life in Hilo, Hawaii.
