= Nipmuc Regional High School =

Location
- 90 Pleasant Street; Upton, Massachusetts, 01568; United States; 42°09′36.46″N 71°37′00.26″W

Information
- Type: Public, Comprehensive, Open enrollment
- Established: 1960
- School district: Mendon-Upton Regional School District
- CEEB code: 221385
- Principal: John K. Clements, Mary Anne Moran
- Teaching staff: 46.6 (on a FTE basis)
- Grades: 9-12
- Enrollment: 534 (2024-2025)
- Student to teacher ratio: 11.5
- Campus: Rural - Fringe
- Campus size: 50 acres (20 ha)
- Colors: Green, white, and gold
- Athletics: Yes
- Athletics conference: MIAA Central Massachusetts Athletic Conference
- Nickname: Warrior
- Rival: Blackstone Valley Technical
- Accreditation: NEASC CPSS
- USNWR ranking: 130 (MA), 3397 (US) (2024)
- SAT average: 596 Reading/Writing; 543 Math; 1139 total (2023-2024)
- Communities served: Upton, Mendon
- Feeder schools: Miscoe Hill Middle School
- Graduates (2024): 146
- Website: www.mursd.org/o/nipmuc-regional-high-school

Nipmuc Regional High School is a public high school in Upton, Massachusetts, United States, part of the Mendon-Upton Regional School District.

Nipmuc Regional High School is located on a fifty-acre wooded lot in Upton, Massachusetts, in the Blackstone Valley region of the state. It serves the towns of Mendon and Upton through a cooperative arrangement established in 1961. The school was named after the Nipmuc indigenous people of the area. In addition to Nipmuc Regional, there are three other schools in the Mendon-Upton Regional School District: Miscoe Hill Middle School, Henry P. Clough Elementary School (Mendon), and Memorial Elementary School (Upton). In 2024, the year-round populations of the two towns were 6,228 (Mendon) and 8,000 (Upton).

== Sports ==
Nipmuc Regional High School sports include mixed cheer leading, cross country, football, Golf (men), soccer, field hockey, baseball, volleyball, lacrosse, track (indoor/outdoor), hockey, basketball, wrestling and swimming. They are in the Dual Valley Conference (a conference made up entirely of division 5 schools, with the exception of Nipmuc) and their sports range from division 1 to division 4. The boys' soccer team won the Division 3 State Championship in 2017. The girls’ soccer team won the Division 3 MIAA State Championship in 2024. The following year they came in second losing 1-0 to the Medfield team.

== Demographics ==
According to Massachusetts Department of Elementary and Secondary Education annual statistics, for the 2024-2025 academic year, the demographic enrollment distributions for race, gender and grade level at Nipmuc Regional High School are as follows:

Total number of enrolled students: 534
Total number of full-time equivalent educators: 46.6
Therefore, the student to teacher ratio for this school is 11.5:1

Enrollment by Race/Ethnicity (2024-2025)
Race	Enrolled Pupils*	% of District
African American	4	0.7%
Asian	14	2.6%
Hispanic	45	8.4%
Native American	0	0.0%
White	462	86.5%
Native Hawaiian, Pacific Islander	0	0.0%
Multi-Race, Non-Hispanic	9	1.7%
Total	534	100%

* Approximate number of enrolled pupils is calculated based on total number of students in district, multiplied by reported percentage, and rounded to nearest whole student.

Enrollment by gender (2024-2025)
Gender	Enrolled pupils	Percentage
Female	276	51.69%
Male	257	48.13%
Non-binary	1	0.19%
Total	534	100%

Enrollment by Grade
Grade	Pupils Enrolled	Percentage
9	133	24.91%
10	122	22.85%
11	123	23.03%
12	150	28.09%
SP*	6	1.12%
Total	534	100%

* SP = Special Education Beyond Grade 12

== Advanced Placement ==
The participation rate for Nipmuc is 68%

== Notable alumni and faculty ==
- Rachel Bloznalis: alumna; soccer player who played for Djurgårdens IF in the Swedish Damallsvenskan
- Kevin Gilmartin; former head football coach at Nipmuc
- Tom Grant: alumnus; Chicago Cubs Major League Baseball player, alumnus

== See also ==
- List of high schools in Massachusetts
