= Bengali Hindu mythology and culture =

Bengali Hindu mythology and culture in a literal sense have been indistinguishable from Indian mythology and Indian culture. But in some cases, Bengali Hindu mythology and Bengali Hindu culture can be different from the Indian and/or other regional counterparts.

Bengali Hindu mythology and culture can refer to the historical legends and folk tales of West Bengal and Bangladesh and the culture of Bengal region. Given the historical Hindu and Buddhist presence in the region, characters from Vedic and Hindu mythology are present within Bengali literature.

== Spiritual life of Benga ==
Bengal is known for giving to the world great knowledge about spiritual and material worlds. Scriptures like Caitanya Caritamrita explain in great details structure of both spiritual and material worlds. It more than just mythology, because it deals with bhakti - eternal relationship of soul, jivaatma with Supersoul, Vishnu, Krsna. Thus we know so many extraordinary narrations about other planes of existence - demigods on higher planets, about Vishnu and His countless avataras.

Bengali Hindus observe a ceremony called Svastyayana in which 108 or 1008 tulasi leaves anointed with sandalwood paste are offered on a shaligrama shila with the aim of healing diseases or being delivered from troubles. This can be accompanied by Chandipatha (ritualistic recitation of the Devi Mahatmya) once, thrice or five times; worshipping one or four clay Shivalingas and chanting the mantras of Durga and Vishnu 108 or 1008 times.

== Festivals ==
- Chaitanya
- Manasamangal Kāvya
- Mangal-Kāvya
- Dharmamangal
- Gaudiya Vaishnavism
- Brahmoism
- Shashthi
- Savitri Brata, similar to North Indian Karva Chauth
- Kojagari Lakshmi Puja, not to be confused with Lakshmi Puja performed on Diwali Amavasya
- Bhai Phonta, similar to Noth Indian Bhau-beej and Raksha Bandhan
- Jagaddhatri
- Swami Vivekananda's Birthday
- Saraswati Puja
- Pratapaditya Utsav (Bengali: প্রতাপাদিত্য উত্সব), an annual ceremony commemorating Pratapaditya's declaration of independence and his coronation as the sovereign monarch of Jessore.
- Gangasagar
- Chand Sadagar
- Ratha-Yatra and Dhamrai Jagannath Roth
- Jhulan Purnima
- Ambubachi Mela
- Snana Yatra
- Ramakrishna Mission

== Vratas ==
- Aada-halud vrata
- Champa Chandan Vrata
- Maghmandal Vrata
- Prithvi Vrata
- Punyipukur Vrata
- Senjuti Vrata
- Yampukur Vrata

== Marriage ==
- Bengali Hindu wedding
