= Putrakameshti =

Ritual in Hinduism

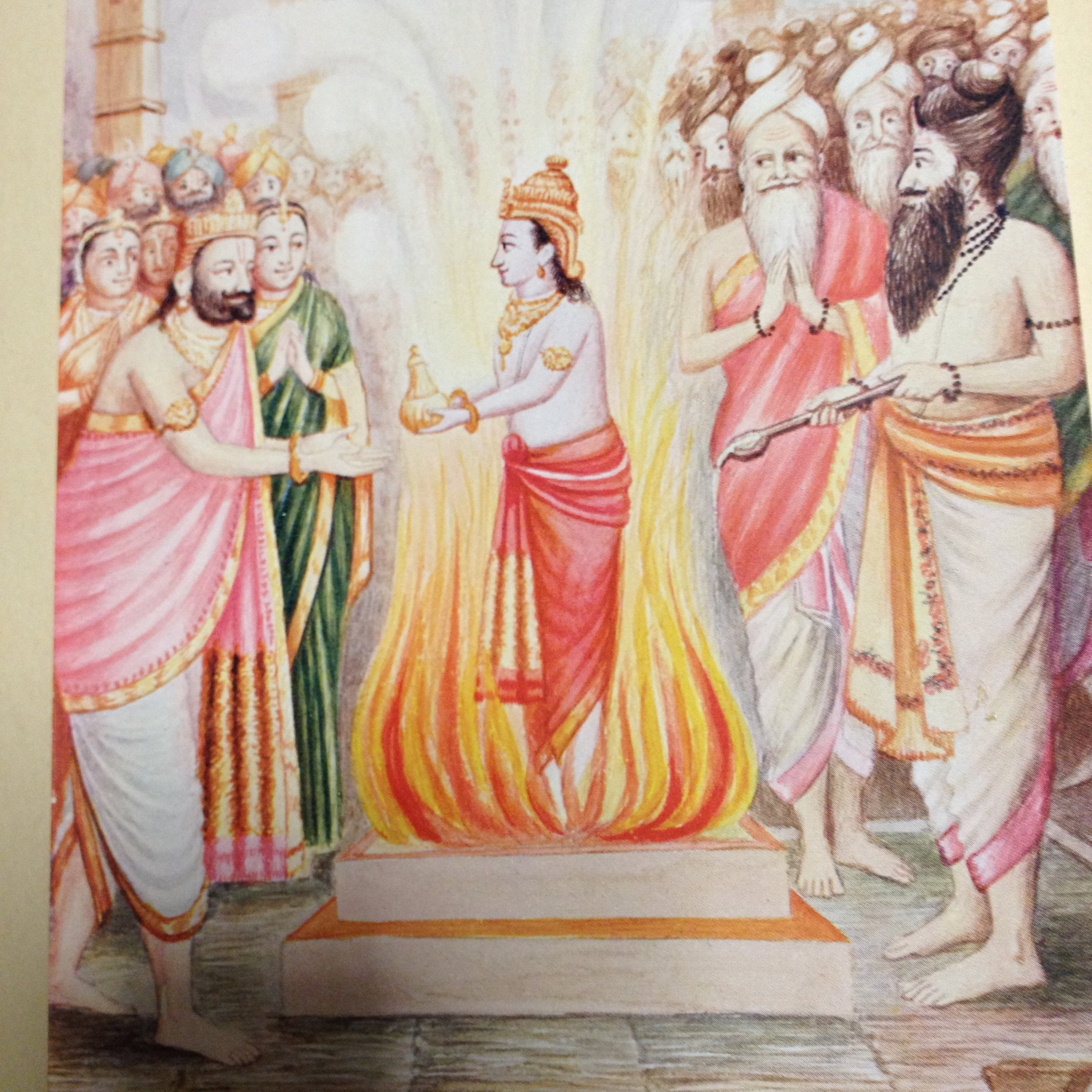
Putrakameshti performed by King Dhasharatha-Rishyashringa performed the holy sacrifice and the final day of the event, a dark skinned deity appeared from sacrificial altar and handed over a vessel of payasam to Dasharatha.

Putrakameshti (Sanskrit: पुत्रकामेष्टि, romanized: Putrakāmeṣṭi, lit. 'oblation in desire of children') is a special yajna performed in Hinduism for the sake of bearing children. It is classified under a series of rituals called the kamya-karma.

== Literature ==
In the ancient Indian epic Ramayana, upon the recommendation of Sage Vashishta, King Dasharatha of Ayodhya performed the Putrakameshti Yajna under the supervision of Rishyashringa, an expert in Yajurveda, which has the guidelines for this yajna. After its successful completion, the god of fire, Agni, appeared and gave a bowl of payasam to the King of Ayodhya, which was provided to his three queens in order to promulgate his sons Rama, Lakshmana, Bharata, and Shatrughna.
