= Nityakarma =

Obligatory Vedic duties in Hinduism

Nityakarma (Sanskrit: नित्यकर्म, romanized: Nityakarma) refers to obligatory Vedic duties that are prescribed for daily practice in Hinduism. Nityakarma is among the three ritual actions classified by the Mimamsa philosophy, along with nisiddhakarma and kamyakarma. It is also featured in the Shaiva Siddhanta philosophy.

== Description ==
According to Parasara, the six activities are regarded to be nityakarmas:

- Snana (bathing)
- Sandhyavandanam (morning and evening prayers)
- Recitation of the Vedas
- Veneration of ancestors
- Homam (offerings to fire)
- Tarpana (worship of the gods)

== See also ==
- Kamyakarma
- Shrauta
