= Vrata =

Vow, resolve, or pious observance, usually a fast in Indian religions

Vrata is a Sanskrit term meaning "vow, resolve, devotion". It refers to religious observances like fasting and pilgrimage (Tirtha) in Indian religions, like Hinduism and Jainism. It may be accompanied by prayers for the health and happiness of loved ones.

== Meaning and use ==
=== Etymology ===
Vrata (Sanskrit: व्रत) means "vow, resolve, devotion". In Hinduism and Jainism it refers to a range of religious observances that can include fasting, restrictions on diet, prayer and other forms and types of austerity. A vrata is observed as a religious practice or prayer seeking health, fertility, long life or happiness for loved ones.

Derived from the root 'vr' ("will, rule, restrain, conduct, choose, select"), the word is found more than 200 times in the Rigveda. It is also found in other Vedic literature like the Upanishads, but the context suggests that the meaning of the word in the Vedic era was not as a personal pious observance, and instead was related to ṛta and dharma, in the sense of inner principles and universal laws that keep order in the cosmos. In hymn 9.112.1 of the Rigveda, a person's vocation is called their vrata, meaning that whatever profession one dedicates oneself to is considered a vrata in vedic literature. In additon to this, in hymn 1.93.8 of the Rigveda, the act of sacrifice itself is also called vrata.

=== Vedic use ===
Some linguistic research links the Vedic term vrata with "group" or "band" and vratya, which is a term that is associated with those who were members of early ascetic and warrior groups. In some early Vedic ritual practice vrata referred to types of self-discipline and dietary restrictions that were followed during initiation (diksa). This could involve fasting and undergoing physical hardship which were intended to prepare the person receiving initiation (diksita) for their sacrifice. In some Dharmasastra texts, including the Manusmriti, vratya referred to a person who belonged to one of the 3 twice born varnas (social classes) who had not gone through upanayana (sacred initiation) at the required time or had not completed their associated ritual vows (vratas). In these texts, a person like this was considered to be someone who had lost their class status (patita).

Vrata: the vow

Be thou the wife at their sacrifices,
strict in thy vows [vrata],
and gifted with joy!

— Kunti to Draupadi, Mahabharata 1.191.5
Transl: Anne Pearson

=== Later use ===
Post-Vedic texts use the term as a form of self-imposed dietary and behavioral restrictions, sometimes with a vow. The concept evolves as a form of religious votive rite, personalized and interiorized, one that does not need a public ceremony or a private one, but that is privately observed. Its meaning retains a sense of personal sacrifice (fast, or restricted diet), in exchange for hope, accompanied with a prayer to a personally defined or cherished divinity, and propelled by the wish for the well being of one's loved ones. The Grihya-sutras (domestic life manuals), the Puranas and the epics describe the practice among Vedic students, Brahmins, and women, as "devotion, solemn vow, holy practice, resolve, dedication".

In early Dharmasastra texts, which set out rules on Hindu law as well as conduct, vrata referred to rules of proper conduct (acara), bodily cleanliness (sauca), and moral obligations for both householders (grhastha) and Vedic students (brahmacarin). In some Hindu legal texts, vrata is considered to be a category of dharma together with daily household practices (ahnika) and rites of passage (samskaras) as well as offerings to ancestors (sraddha). These texts outlined rules regarding self discipline and dietary restictions. In some Hindu traditions concerning rituals, vratas are understood as personal or household vows that are taken to gain spiritual merits or fulfill aims. They may be categorized as rites that happen occasionally (naimittika karman) or rites performed to fulfill a specific wish (kamya karman) like family health, well being and success in the household. From around the 10th to the 12th century, legal texts known as nibandhas began to include vratas, pilgrimages (yatras), and devotional worship (bhakti) in their discussions about dharma.

== Hinduism ==
Vrata is a religious votive rite, a vow often involving abstinence from food that is particularly common with women. It may be accompanied with elaborate prayers and other rites like a charity or visit to a temple, and is sometimes observed during festivals or with rites of passage (sanskara) ceremonies. It is found in ancient Hindu texts, like the Vedas, but is used in varied contexts and does not always refer to pious observance.

The Upanishads conceptualize Vrata as an ethical and behavioral process of discipline where students pursue knowledge, food is respected, the needy are helped, and strangers are welcomed. The Puranas link the practice to the empowering concept of a woman's Shakti, while the Dharmasastras link it as a form of penance through the concept of Prāyaścitta for both men and women.

In the Yoga Sutras (verse II.31), Patanjali uses vrata when highlighting that the five yamas form a mahavrata (a great vow). In this verse, Patanjali states that yamas (vrata or mahavrata) universally applies to all practicing yogis, regardless of class, location, time, or situation.

A vrata is a personal practice that typically that does not need a priest, but it may involve personal prayer, chanting, reading spiritual texts, social gatherings of friends and family, or silent meditation.

=== Reasons ===
A vrata may be motivated by a range of factors and is observed by both men and women, but far more often by women. The most common reasons for a vrata are temporal wishes, such as the speedy recovery of a sick child, success or happiness for a loved one, fertility, protection from negativity, or prayers and good wishes for someone departing to a distant place. For women, prayers are usually on behalf of brother(s), children or husbands, but sometimes for the woman's own prosperity, mind-body balance and health.

Sociologists who have interviewed women who observe vrata report that the practice is explained (according to Anne Pearson) as a source of "peace of mind", that the woman making one has made an effort to the best of her abilities and out of her duty towards those important to her. She has a sense of contentment in her heart and intellect, and thus she feels she has achieved something. It is also an expression of care and love, alongside a reminder of Hindu ethical principles.

A vrata is sometimes practiced by students (brahmacharya) or householders (grihastha) if they feel it is obligatory before, or during, certain spiritual or religious practices. Religious festivals (utsava), share some elements with vratas, with them incorporating fasting and similar austerities as a part of festive observance. Some vratas are for religious (dharma) or soteriological (moksha) goals to non-religious reasons, cultural celebrations, or a form of quid pro quo sacrifice to get or to give divine help to someone.

Another reason for observing vratas is the belief that they are a form of penance and self-correction; expiatory (prāyaścitta) rites, something that is discussed in the Dharmasastra texts. Many prāyaścitta vratas in these texts suggest it should include the feeding of "Brahmins, blind, poor and helpless", as well as other acts of charity. In addition to fasting, other examples of vrata include burning incense, prayers before a deity, and meditation. The śmrtis discuss vratas in great detail to the extent that they specify what type of flowers should be used in worship.

Both the Dharmashastras and the Puranas state that men and women can expiate their sins through the use of vratas. For prāyaścitta, vratas are the second most discussed method in the Puranas, after the pilgrimage (tirtha).

=== Observances and practices ===
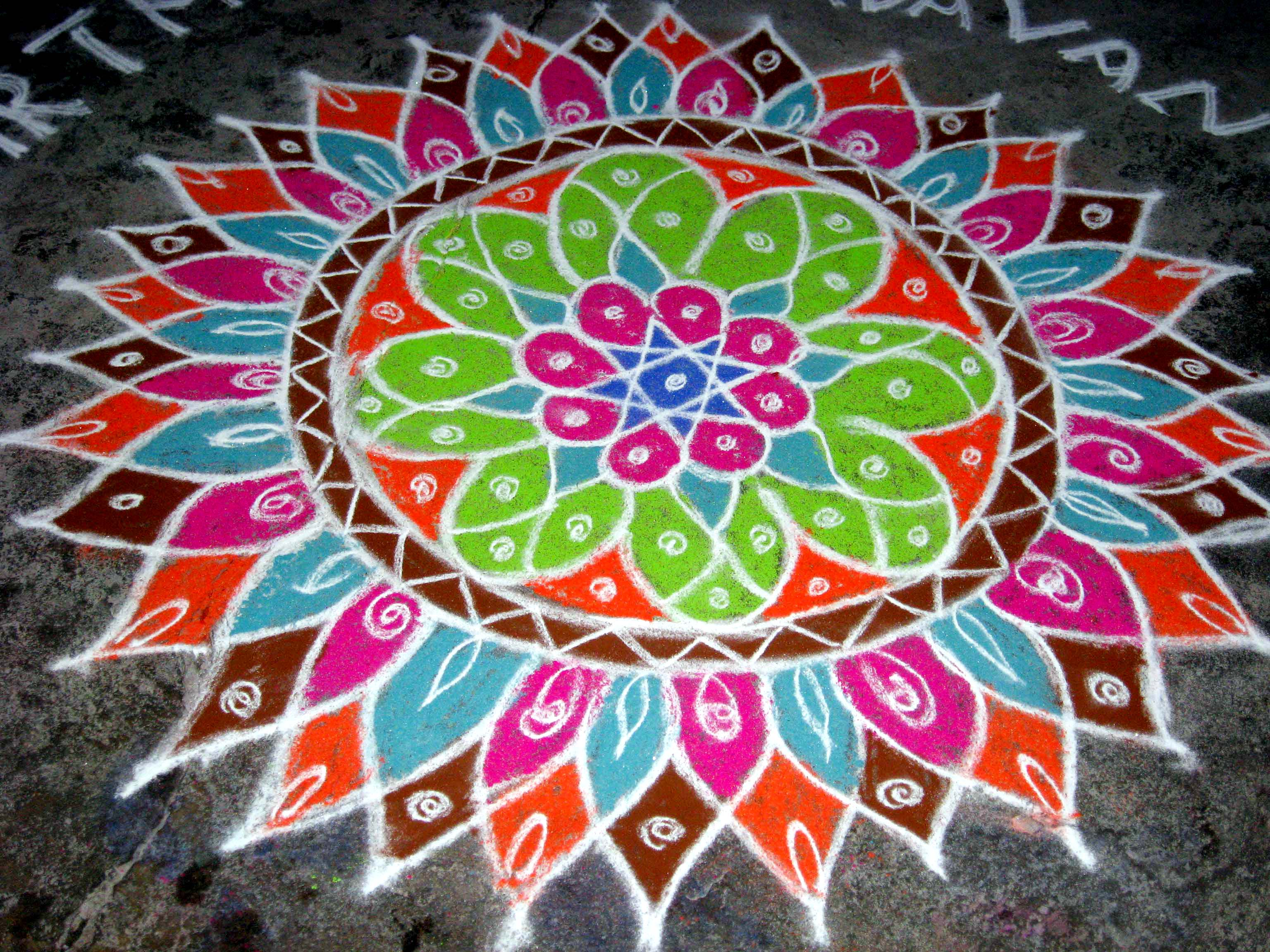
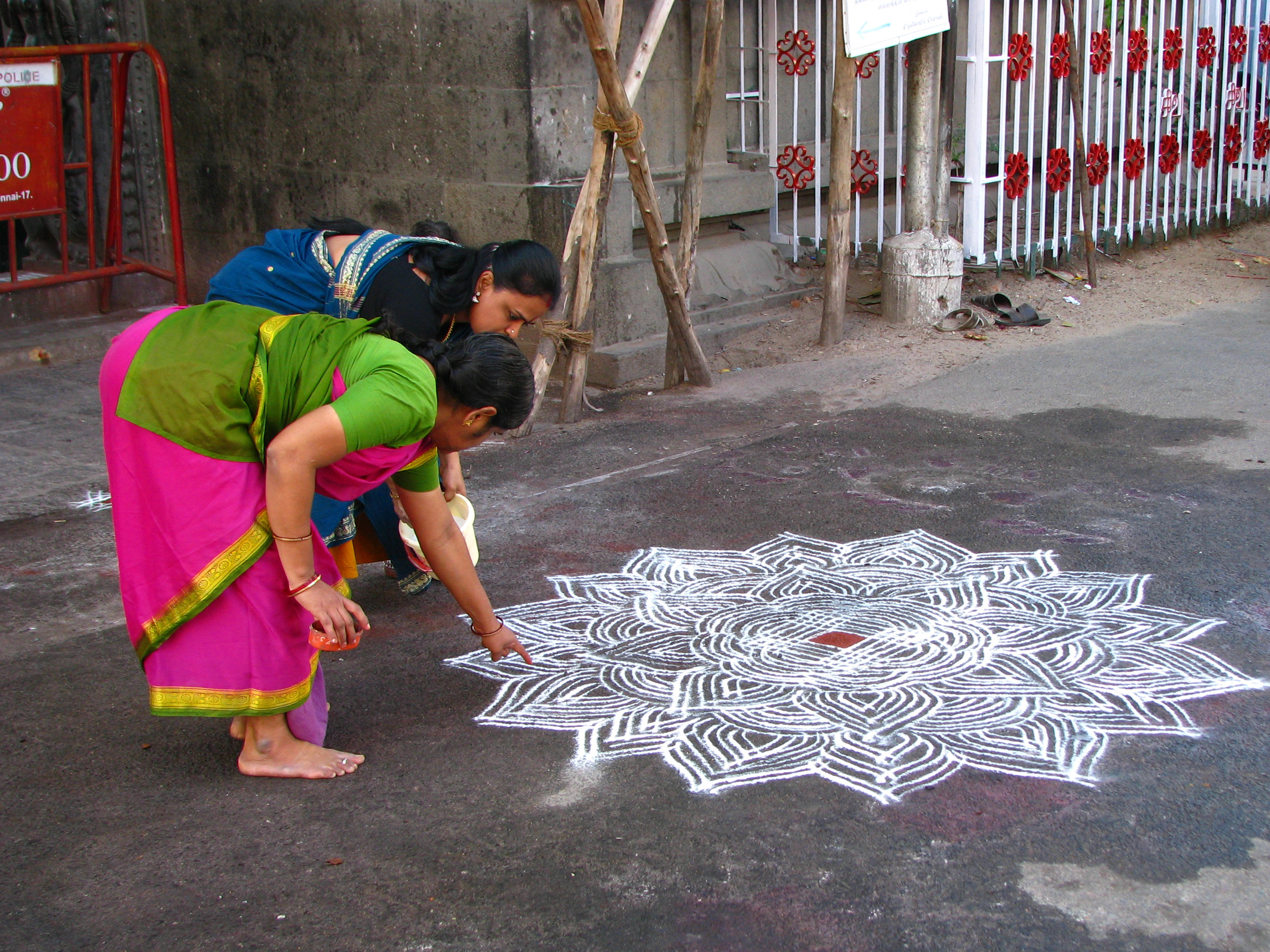
Vrata may be observed as a silent private rite, or be it can be more elaborate, with activities such as the drawing of vrata mandalas such as kolam, rangoli or mehndi.

A vrata is observed either as an independent private ritual at a date of one's choice, within a particular ceremony such as a wedding, or during major festivals like Diwali, Shivaratri, Navratri, or the Ekadashis of various deities.

A typical vrata involves fasting for a fixed period of time, usually a full day, where either no food is eaten, or only one meal is eaten, or only where a certain item like milk is consumed. Other observances include sleeping on the ground or not sleeping at all, or practicing yoga with meditation, reading scriptures and giving to charity (dāna).

More elaborate vratas, such as those associated with major festivals or pilgrimages or rites of passage may involve weeks of preparation, drawing Vrata mandala with coloured powders, decorating and cleaning the home, taking special baths, wearing festive clothing, giving to charity, visiting Hindu temples or performing puja within one's home. In Nepal, for example, Hindus visit the Pashupatinatha temple, families light lamps on Balacaturdasi night and then set them afloat in the Bagamati river the next morning, followed by strewing of grains for birds. Kane lists hundreds of vrata found in Hindu texts.

=== Types ===
The puranas denote various types of vratas, such as,

- kayika-vrata. It is a vrata pertaining to the body. The stress is on physical austerity like fasting.
- vachika-vrata or vrata pertaining to speech. Here much importance is given to speaking the truth and reciting the scriptures.
- manasa-vrata or vrata pertaining to the mind. The emphasis here is on controlling the mind, by controlling the passions and prejudices that arise in it.

A vrata may also be classified by its duration: a vrata lasting one day is a dina-vrata, and a vrata lasting for a paksha (week or fortnight) is a vaara-vrata or a paksha-vrata.

There are different rules and guidelines followed while observing a given vrata period.

=== Nirjala-vrata (nirjal vrat) ===
A nirjala-vrata (waterless fast) is a fast without consuming any food and water. Unlike normal (common) vratas where the consumption of fruits, juices, milk, water and sugar is allowed, the 'vrati' (person doing the vrat) does not consume anything with the intent of purifying their body. Nirjala-vrata is commonly observed on Hindu festivals such as Nirjala Ekadashi, and chhath.

== Jainism ==
Five vrata-s (vows) are one of the codes of conduct for Jain householders. Any of the vows (vratas) that govern the activities of both monks and laymen. These are similar to the Yamas of yoga, and include the vow of ahimsa, satya, asteya, brahmacharya and aparigraha. In addition to this, Jainism also has 7 supplementary vows, called the Shila-vratas, which suggest extra virtues.

Fasting is part of vrata observances in Jainism, and some involve congregational fasting at temples. Vrata among Jain women may involve complete or partial fasting on certain specific days; a pilgrimage (tirtha) to a particular place or places, as well as virtuous actions to others. Vrata is viewed as a form of austerity, with the power to remove karma from the soul (jiva) and gain merit (punya).

Laypersons are not expected to observe these vows strictly. Once a layperson has gone through the preliminary stages of spiritual discipline (gunasthana), they may pledge to observe 12 vows for a stated period of time, with the option of them choosing to renew the pledge upon completion.

== See also ==
- Jaya Parvati vrat
- Punyipukur Vrata
- Vow of silence
- Novena
- Tapas (Indian religions)
- Tapas (Jain religion)
- Yampukur Vrata
