= Senjuti Vrata =

Senjuti Vrata (Bengali: সেঁজুতি ব্রত) is an annual monthwide Hindu ritual or vrata (religious vow), mainly observed in the Bengali Hindu community in West Bengal and Bangladesh. The meaning of Senjuti is “observance of the evening lamp”. In the Bengali Hindu houses of rural Bengal, unmarried girls aged five to nine years observe this festival by painting alpana and lighting lamps in the courtyard of the house every evening for a month from the Sankranti of Kartik month to the last day of the month of Agrahayan or Agrahayan Sankranti (mid-October to mid-November). The purpose of the vrata is to get a good husband and family, to have children, to protect them and increase all kinds of wealth and to live happily and peacefully. In the alpana and rhyme of the vrata, these motives and real-life problems of the innocent mind are reflected. The Mynah bird appears frequently in the Alpana design of this vrata to keep away the co-wives.

== Rules ==
This vrata is performed on the floor of the house in rural Bengal or the floor of the house. Being an unmarried girls festival, no Sanskrit mantra or Brahmin priest is required to observe the vrata.

There are three stages of Senjuti Vrat. Namely: accumulation, verb and rhyme.

- In the first stage, the necessary rituals for observing the fast, i.e. a pitcher, 'pituli' made of akshat rice powder, a large amount of 'durba' grass, incense, lamps and a water pot have to be collected.
- In the second stage, in the hope of realizing the desire of the virgin mind, Shiva idol, Shiva temple, Ganga Jamuna, trees, houses, householders, kitchens, utensils and jewellery, ten dolls, 'Hatha Po Kankhe Po' etc. have to be drawn in the diagram of 52 subjects.
- In the third stage, 52 rhymes have to be recited to fulfil the desire with a durba on each diagram.

At the end of the vrata, the grass is lifted from the courtyard placed in the pitcher and bowed down to the necklace.

- After four years of regular observance of the vrata, the vrata is celebrated by offering clothes, sheets, panchamrit, honey bowls and Dakshina with food to three Brahmins.
