= Sree Veda Vyasa Temple =

Temple in India

Sree Veda Vyasa Temple is one of the major temples in India. It has Sree Veda Vyasa, the creator of the ancient epic Mahabharata, as the main deity (god of worship) and Sree Hanuman, the devotee of Sree Rama.

The temple is located in Neerattupuram near Chakkulathukavu Sree Bhagavathi Temple in Alappuzha District, Kerala, on the bank of the River Pampa.
