= Maghmandal Vrata =

Bengali Hindu sun ritual

Maghamandal Vrata (Bengali: মাঘমণ্ডল ব্রত) is an annual monthwide Hindu ritual or vrata (religious vow), mainly observed in the Bengali Hindu community in West Bengal and Bangladesh. It is a significant vrata of Bengal where the Sun is worshipped. The unmarried girls (age of 6 to 10) of the Bengali Hindu houses of rural Bengal observe this fast for a month from the first day of the month of Magh to the entire Magh (Mid-January to mid-February). The purpose of the vow is to get a good husband and family.

== Features of the vrata ==
This vrata is performed at the waterbodies near the homestead of rural Bengal. During the winter month of Magh, the little girls would rise at dawn to take the clay stupa depicting the sun to the edge of the tank, where she would chant mantras and worship with flowers. Being a feminine vow, no vedic mantra or priest is required to observe the vrata.

- In the first phase of observing Maghamandal Vrata, the girls need to collect the necessary materials i.e. Pituligola, Durbagrass and flowers with Atap chal (parboiled rice).
- In the second stage, on the morning of the vrata, before sunrise, after taking a bath before sunrise, clean the pond on the ground and draw the moon, sun, earth, stars and elm trees.
- In the third stage, at the moment of worship, the mantra of worship for the Sun God in front of the painted alpana is to be recited one by one.

In the alpana drawing of the Maghamandal Vrata various coloured powders are used. This design usually consists of five concentric circles with representations of the sun and the moon at the top and the bottom. On the other hand, The songs and actions in performance of the rituals regarding this cult take the shape of a drama showing the power of the bright sunshine over the miserable conditions of wintertime.
