= Aada-halud vrata =

Aada-Halud vrata or Aada-Haldi Vrata (Bengali: আদা-হলুদ ব্রত) is one of the unscriptural or feminine vows of bengali Hindu society in West Bengal and bangladesh.

== Background ==
The married women of Bengali Hindu houses in rural Bengal observe this vrata on the Sankranti of the month of Chaitra. Brtini gives ginger (Aada), turmeric (Halud) along with a handful of paddy plants to a married woman every day for the whole month of Baishakh from Sankranti of Chaitra month (mid-April to mid-May). This ritual has to be observed every four years. The purpose of the vrata is to remove the food shortage in the world forever.

Being a feminine vow, no mantra or priest is required to observe the vow.

== Features of the vrata ==
In the first phase of observing the Aada-Halud vrata, the women have to collect the necessary ingredients i.e. paddy plants, coriander, ginger, turmeric, sandesh or such sweets and a few paise.

In the second phase, a married woman has to pay a handful of paddy, a handful of coriander, five ginger, five turmerics, five sandesh or similar sweets and five paisa, every day from Sankranti of Chaitra month to the whole of Baisakh.

In the same way, two married women have to observe the vow in the second year, three women in the third year, and four women in the fourth year.

After observing the vrata in the fourth year, during the celebration, on the Sankranti of the month of Baisakh, four widows are carefully fed and given red-bordered sarees, cows, noa, vermilion chupari, head rubbing, alta and dakshina. Bratini then gave the first year's main woman a silver vermilion box, gold-plated Noah, fan, comb, mirror, a towel and one rupee dakshina.
