= Yampukur Vrata =

Yampukur Vrata (Bengali: যমপুকুর ব্রত) is an annual monthwide Hindu ritual or vrata (religious vow), mainly observed in the Bengali Hindu community in West Bengal and Bangladesh. Bengali Hindu girls of rural Bengal observe this fast for a month from the Sankranti of Ashwin month to the last day of Kartik month (mid-October to mid-November). It is celebrated for four consecutive years. The purpose of the vrata is to avoid the suffering from any kind of pain in the after death for neighbors and relatives.

== Background ==
This vrata is performed in the courtyard or floor of the house in rural Bengal or on the pond or garden. Being an unscriptural feminine vrata, no mantra or priest is required to observe the ritual.

In the first phase of observing Yampukur Vrata, the necessary materials i.e. paddy, mankachu (Giant taro), banana, turmeric, kalmi (water spinach), Shushni (Water Clover), and helencha (buffalo spinach) seedlings, betel nut, a few cowries and a few clay idols are collected.

In the second phase, a square pond (one square foot of moderate soil) with four ghats are dug around and the pond is filled with water and placed on the alpana of Pituli on the southern side of the ghat. Fish and Mechuni in the northern ghats, washermen and washermen in the eastern ghats, clay idols of crows, egrets, kites, crocodiles, turtles, sharks, etc. are kept in the west-sided ghats. In the middle of the pond, a bunch of paddy, Kalmi, Shushni and Hincha trees have to be planted; Kachu, turmeric etc. trees are on the bank.

In the third stage, during the puja, a lamp is lit with four cowries, four turmeric and betel nut in the four corners of the pond; Then the women worship Yama with flowers facing east. There are different mantras for watering ponds, pouring water on trees and worshipping idols. At the end of the puja it is said:

"I am lucky to be the sister of seven brothers. I celebrate Yampukur, which is witnessed by the lord of the universe".

At the end of the puja, the vrata ends by listening to the greatness of Yampukur Vrat.

During the celebration of the vrata every four years, one kahana (80 cowries) and dakshina donations and four Brahmins are feasted.
