= Prithvi Vrata =

Hindu ritual

Prithvi Vrata (Bengali: পৃথিবী ব্রত) is an annual Hindu ritual or vrata (religious vow), mainly observed in the Bengali Hindu community in West Bengal and Bangladesh. Unmarried girls of Bengali Hindu houses in rural Bengal celebrate this ritual for a month from the Sankranti of Chaitra month to the whole month of Baishakh (mid-April to mid-May). It is celebrated every four years. The purpose of the vrata is to remove worldly evils.

== Features of the vrata ==
This vrata is performed on the floor of the house in rural Bengal or the floor of the house. Being a feminine vrata, no mantra or priest is required to observe the vow.

There are three stages of observance of earth vows. Namely: accumulation, verb and rhyme.

- In the first stage, the necessary materials i.e. atap rice (Non-parboiled rice), small conch, honey, milk and ghee have to be collected.
- In the second stage, alpana of the lotus leaves, earth and earth goddess are drawn on the ground cleanly.
- In the third stage, at the moment of worship, ghee, milk and honey are poured into the conch shell, kneeling in front of the painted alpana, reciting the mantra of worship three times and pouring it on the alpana.

After observing the vrata for four years, golden lotus leaves have to be given to the goddess during the festival.
