= Champa chandan Vrata =

Champa Chandan Vrata (Bengali: চাঁপা চন্দন ব্রত) is an annual monthwide Hindu ritual or vrata (religious vow), mainly observed in the Bengali Hindu community in West Bengal and Bangladesh. The unmarried girls of Bengali Hindu communities in rural Bengal celebrate this ritual throughout the month of Jaishta (mid-May to mid-June). The purpose of the vrata is to get a ha husband with the nature of Mahadev Shiva.

== Features of the Vrata ==
This vrata is performed in the courtyard, pond or garden of the homestead of rural Bengal. Being a feminine Vrata, no Sanskrit mantra or Brahmin priest is required to celebrate the ritual.

- In the first stage of observing Champa Chandan Vrat, the necessary materials i.e. Kanak Chapa flowers, sandalwood, Ganga soil or any riverbank soil, milk, ghee and honey have to be collected.
- In the month of Baishakh, 64 Kanak Chapa flowers are to be dried with white sandalwood.
- In the second stage, every morning from the 1st Jaishtha, the Shiva idol is made of clay placed in a brass racket and bathed with milk.
- Then Shiva idols are worshipped with ghee, honey and champa flowers.
