= Jaya Parvati vrat =

Jaya Paarvati Vrats

Jaya Parvati Vrat or Gauri Vrat, is a Hindu festival observed in the month of Ashadha whereby unmarried women fast for five days and worship the Hindu goddess Parvati in order to seek an ideal husband. Foods containing salt are not eaten; instead, items such as wheat flour, milk, ghee and fruits are consumed. The festival is observed mainly in the state of Gujarat.

== Description ==
Jaya Parvati vrat katha (the story or legend of Jaya Parvati vrat) is associated with a Brahmin woman who observed this vrat to get her husband free from his curse(was not really a curse). The divine couple Lord Shiva and Goddess Parvati is worshipped during this vrat.

Gujaratis also worship Goddess Gauri in Ashadh Maas as Gauri Vrat.

There is a legend behind the Jaya Parvati Vrat. There was a Brahmin couple. They were devotees of Lord Shiva. They had everything in their life but a child. They used to worship Lord Shiva every day in the temple. Lord Shiva was propitiated with the devotion of the couple and there was a revelation which said "My Shiva Linga is at a certain place in the jungle. No body is performing its puja. If you go there and perform its puja, then your wishes will be fulfilled." The Brahmin couple was pleased when they heard this. They went to the jungle and found out the place where Lord Shiva's Shiva Linga was. The couple found the Linga and the Brahmin went in search of flowers to perform the puja, where he was bitten by a snake and fell unconscious. His wife got worried as her husband did not return and went in search for him. She prayed intensely for her husband's safety. Lord Shiva saw the true devotion of the Brahmin woman and brought her husband back to consciousness. Later, the couple prayed at the Linga and they had a son.

== Vrat ==
When observing Jaya Parvati vrat, one cannot eat tomatoes, spices, salt, and vegetables. It is believed that Jaya Parvati vrat brings happiness and blesses the girl with a good husband and a happy married life.

On the first day of the vrat, wheat seeds (javaara) are planted in a small bowl/pot and kept by the temple in the house. Prayers are then offered to the javaar pot. A nagla (a necklace made from cotton wool) is decorated with vermillion (kumkum). This ritual is carried out every morning and the wheat seeds are watered.

On the last day, the women who have observed the fast have to remain awake the whole night of the fifth day called jagran. On the sixth day, the javara are taken out of the pot are immersed in the holy waters of rivers or ponds after taking a bath and wearing beautiful dresses; offer prayers at Mataji's temple and break the fast by eating a full meal consisting of salt, chapaatis made of wheat, and vegetables.
