= Punyipukur Vrata =

Punyipukur Vrata (Bengali: পুণ্যিপুকুর ব্রত) is an annual monthwide Hindu ritual or vrata (religious vow), mainly observed in the Bengali Hindu community in West Bengal and Bangladesh.

== Background ==
In the Bengali Hindu houses of rural Bengal, unmarried girls aged five to nine years observe this fast for a month from the Sankranti of the month of Chaitra to the last day (Sankranti) of the month of Baisakh (mid-march to mid-April). The purpose of the vrata is to ensure that the pond does not become waterless in the drought of the month of Baisakh or the trees do not die in the summer season and the crop is good.

== Rules of the Vrata ==
This vrata is performed in the courtyard or floor of the house in rural Bengal or on the pond or garden. Being an unscriptural feminine vrata, no mantra or priest is required to observe the ritual.

There are three stages of Punyapukur vrata. Namely: accumulation, verb, and rhyme.

In the first stage, the necessary rituals for observing the fast, i.e. white flowers, sandalwood, durba grass, tulsi plants, branches of bel tree with leaves, a few cowries, and a pot of water have to be collected.

In the second phase, a square pond with four ghats is dug around and the two sides of each ghat are decorated with cowries in the middle of the pond, and the branches of the flower garland or bel tree are placed. In the third stage, water is poured on the tree by reciting four to six lines of rhymes. At the end of the vrata, three times with sandalwood, white flowers and Durba grass are bowed to the pond with Anjali.

After four years, the vrata is celebrated with a kahan cowry after the observance of the vrata at the scheduled time. At the end of the vrata, it is customary to feed one or four Brahmins with golden bells and sixteen Annas dakshina according to the wishes of the girls.
