= Chakkulathukavu Temple =

Hindu temple in Kerala, India

- Chakkulathukavu Temple, Neerattupuram, Thalavady, Alappuzha, Kerala

Religion
- Affiliation: Hinduism
- District: Alappuzha
- Deity: Goddess Durga

Location
- Location: Near Thiruvalla in Neerattupuram, Thalavady panchayat
- State: Kerala
- Country: India
- Coordinates: 9.3669°N 76.5142°E

Specifications
- Temple: One
- Elevation: 26.33 m (86 ft)

Chakkulathukavu Temple is a Hindu temple dedicated to the goddess Durga. Situated near Thiruvalla in Neerattupuram, Thalavady Panchayat, Alappuzha District, Kerala, India, it is one of the most renowned temples in the state.

As one of the most popular deities in the region, Durga attracts pilgrims from all over South India. Initially, the temple was little-known, serving only as a family temple of a local resident, until it underwent renovation a few decades ago.

Located on the banks of the holy Pampa River, the temple has become a popular pilgrim center, attracting visitors from all over Kerala. It is located just 9 km from Thiruvalla Railway Station, KSRTC, and Thiruvalla City Centre. KSRTC buses ply every 7 minutes from Thiruvalla to Alappuzha via Chakkulathukavu.

The major festival at the temple is Pongala, which takes place during the month of Vrischikam (November/December). This is when the glory of the goddess is at its peak, and lakhs of women devotees gather around the temple, some arriving as early as one week before the function. The temple premises are overcrowded, and the devotees arrange places for offering the Pongala on both sides of the main streets. The queue usually extends to a surprising length of 20 km. Women devotees bring rice, coconut, and jaggery along with round earthen pots for cooking. The chief priest lights the main hearth from the divine fire inside the sanctum sanctorum, which is exchanged from one oven to another.

Another festival celebrated at the temple is Panthrandu Noyampu, which is a type of fasting and prayer that qualifies the devotee for eternal blessings of Chakkulathamma. This fasting starts every year from the first day of the Malayalam month of Dhanu until the twelfth.

Other festivals celebrated at the temple include Naree pooja and Thrikkarthaka.

== See also ==
- Temples of Kerala
- Temple festivals of Kerala
- Anikkattilammakshethram
- List of Hindu deities
- Sree Veda Vyasa Temple, a nearby temple
