= Kamyakarma =

Desire-oriented deeds in Hinduism

Kamyakarma (Sanskrit: काम्यकर्म, romanized: Kāmyakarma) refers to those karmas (deeds) in Hinduism that are prudential in nature, motivated by the desire for a given outcome. Unlike the nitya karmas, the Shastras do not require daily or regular observance of these rituals. They are generally performed for the sake of their intended results. A few kamyakarmas are listed below:

- Putrakameshti
- Agnistoma
- Agnicayana

== See also ==
- Nitya karma
- Shrauta
