= Pratapaditya =

16th-century ruler of Jessore in Bengal

- Maharaja of Jessore
- Reign: 1584–1611
- Predecessor: Srihari Vikramaditya
- Successor: None (Annexed into the Mughal Empire)
- Born: c. 1561; Jessore, Bengal (present-day Bangladesh)
- Died: 1611; Benaras, Mughal India
- Spouse: Sharat Kumari
- Issue: Udayaditya (Note: Not to be confused with the namesake ruler of Malwa), Sangramaditya, Bindumati
- Dynasty: Guha family
- Religion: Hinduism

Pratapaditya (Bengali: প্রতাপাদিত্য; c. 1561 – 1611) was a prominent late-16th and early-17th century zamindar and the ruler of the Kingdom of Jessore in the southern riverine region of Bengal (modern-day Bangladesh and West Bengal, India). He is recognized historically as one of the most powerful chieftains of the Baro-Bhuiyan confederacy, a loose alliance of Muslim and Hindu regional lords who resisted the eastern territorial expansion of the Mughal Empire.

Pratapaditya expanded his domain across the deltaic mangroves of the Sundarbans, establishing a highly organized military administrative apparatus that featured a formidable riverine navy. Initially employing strategic diplomacy toward the Mughals, his subsequent failure to supply military contingents to imperial forces led to a decisive campaign against his realm. Defeated by the forces of Subahdar Islam Khan I in 1611, his kingdom was annexed into the Bengal Subah. During the 19th-century Bengali Renaissance, Pratapaditya was widely reinterpreted in vernacular literature and nationalist historiography as a tragic hero and symbol or regional independence.

== Early life and background ==
Pratapaditya was born into a Kayastha family belonging to the Guha clan. His father, Srihari (later known as Srihari Vikramaditya), and his uncle, Basanta Ray, were influential high-ranking officials in the service of Daud Khan Karrani, the last independent ruler of the Karrani dynasty of the Bengal Sultanate.

Following the definitive defeat and death of Daud Khan Karrani at the Battle of Rajmahal in 1576, the absolute political control of central Bengal dissolved. Taking advantage of the administrative vacuum and securing a substantial portion of the fleeing Sultanate’s royal treasury, Srihari retreated south into the inaccessible, marshy terrain of the lower Ganges Delta. In 1574, Srihari laid the foundations of an independent principality in the Khulna and Jessore regions, adopting the title of Maharaja. Pratapaditya grew up in the courtly, strategic environment of this newly founded deltaic kingdom, eventually succeeding his father as the ruler of Jessore in 1584.

== Reign and military administration ==
Upon assuming power, Pratapaditya embarked on a series of aggressive campaigns to expand and consolidate his territory. At its territorial zenith, his kingdom encompassed the modern districts of Jessore, Khulna, and Barisal in Bangladesh, alongside Nadia, North 24 Parganas, and South 24 Parganas in West Bengal. He moved the administrative capital from Dhumghat to Ishwaripur (historically known as Jeshoreshwaripur).

=== Naval and military organisation ===
Recognising that the dense networks of shifting channels, estuaries, and mangrove forests of the Sundarbans made heavy land-based cavalry warfare ineffective, Pratapaditya focused heavily on developing a riverine military infrastructure. Contemporary accounts, including the Baharistan-i-Ghaibi written by Mughal chronicler Mirza Nathan, highlight his extensive material resources and martial strength.

Pratapaditya's navy consisted of hundreds of swift war-boats, predominantly 64-oared vessels known as ghurabs, which were outfitted with heavy artillery. The naval command was entrusted to Khwaja Kamal, a veteran tactician.

To bolster his military capabilities, Pratapaditya formed strategic economic and military alliances with Portuguese merchants and mercenaries. He permitted them to trade freely within Jessore's ports and hired Portuguese commanders, such as Francisco de Rodar, to train his infantry units and manage his gunpowder factories and cannon foundries.

A network of strategic forts was built along the major river banks, including the critical defensive fort built at Salka.

== Conflict and fall ==
Following the formal Mughal annexation of Bengal, the region remained highly fragmented, with local lords exercising functional autonomy. The situation shifted dramatically in 1608 when Emperor Jahangir appointed Islam Khan I as the Subahdar of Bengal with explicit mandates to centralise imperial authority.

=== Strategic diplomacy ===
Seeking to preserve the sovereignty of Jessore through diplomacy, Pratapaditya was the first of the Baro-Bhuiyan chieftains to send an envoy to Islam Khan I in 1608. He dispatched his youngest son, Sangramaditya, along with extensive tribute to the Mughal camp at Alaipur. Later, Pratapaditya personally attended the Subahdar's court, where he formally acknowledged Mughal vassalage and pledged to provide a supportive fleet of 400 war-boats to assist the imperial forces in their upcoming campaign against the rebel chief Musa Khan.

=== The Mughal campaign against Jessore ===
Pratapaditya ultimately failed to honor his diplomatic pledge, failing to send the promised naval forces during the Mughal expedition against Musa Khan. Viewing this as open insubordination and recognizing the vital military and economic value of controlling the Hooghly hinterlands, Islam Khan I launched a targeted military campaign to subjugate the Jessore kingdom.

Pratapaditya sought a late pardon, sending an advance fleet of 80 war-boats under Sangramaditya, but the Mughal forces rejected the overture, destroying the fleet. Pratapaditya mobilised his primary army under the command of his eldest son, Udayaditya. (Note: Not to be confused with the namesake ruler of Malwa.)

According to the contemporary account in the Baharistan-i-Ghaibi, the decisive engagement took place at the Battle of Salka (c. 1611), north of the capital. Despite a strategically sound riverine defense orchestrated by Udayaditya and his commanders, the Mughal imperial forces smashed the Jessore fleet. Khwaja Kamal was killed in the fighting, and Udayaditya narrowly escaped back to the capital. A secondary defense mounted at a makeshift fort near Jessore held for a few days before falling to a sudden Mughal assault.

=== Captivity and death ===
With his defensive capabilities entirely compromised, Pratapaditya entered the Mughal camp to offer his unconditional submission. He was treated with structural respect as a high-ranking political prisoner and taken to Dhaka, where Islam Khan I placed him in confined custody alongside his sons. While his sons were eventually released, Pratapaditya died in 1611 in Benaras while being transported to the imperial court in Agra. Following his capitulation, the Kingdom of Jessore was permanently dismantled and integrated into the Mughal Empire.

== Cultural impact and legacy ==
The transformation of Pratapaditya from a defeated regional ruler into a cultural icon occurred over several centuries through distinct phases of Bengali literature. The earliest notable mention of Pratapaditya appears in the mid-18th-century historical epic Annadamangal by Raygunakar Bharatchandra. In this work, Pratapaditya is portrayed as a tragic hero favored by the goddess Kali, whose ultimate downfall was brought about by his hubris.

In 1801, scholar Ramram Basu, who was employed at Fort William College in Calcutta, published Raja Pratapaditya Charitra. Printed at the Serampore Mission Press under the supervision of William Carey, this book is recognized as the first original full-length prose book written in the Bengali language. Fusing historical Persian chronicles with oral traditions, the book established Pratapaditya as a significant literary figure.

During the late-19th and early-20th century Bengali Renaissance, nationalist historians and playwrights heavily romanticised Pratapaditya. He was reinvented as an early anti-imperialist freedom fighter who rose against foreign rule, often presented alongside figures like Shivaji and Guru Gobind Singh to foster regional and national pride.

== See also ==
- Baro-Bhuiyan
- History of Bengal
- Mughal conquest of Bengal
