= Annapurna Temple =

Annapurna Temple may refer to:

- Annapurna Devi Mandir
- Annapoorneshwari Temple
- Annapurna Temple, Titagarh
