= Madan Mohan temple, Cooch Behar =

Hindu temple in Cooch Behar, West Bengal in India

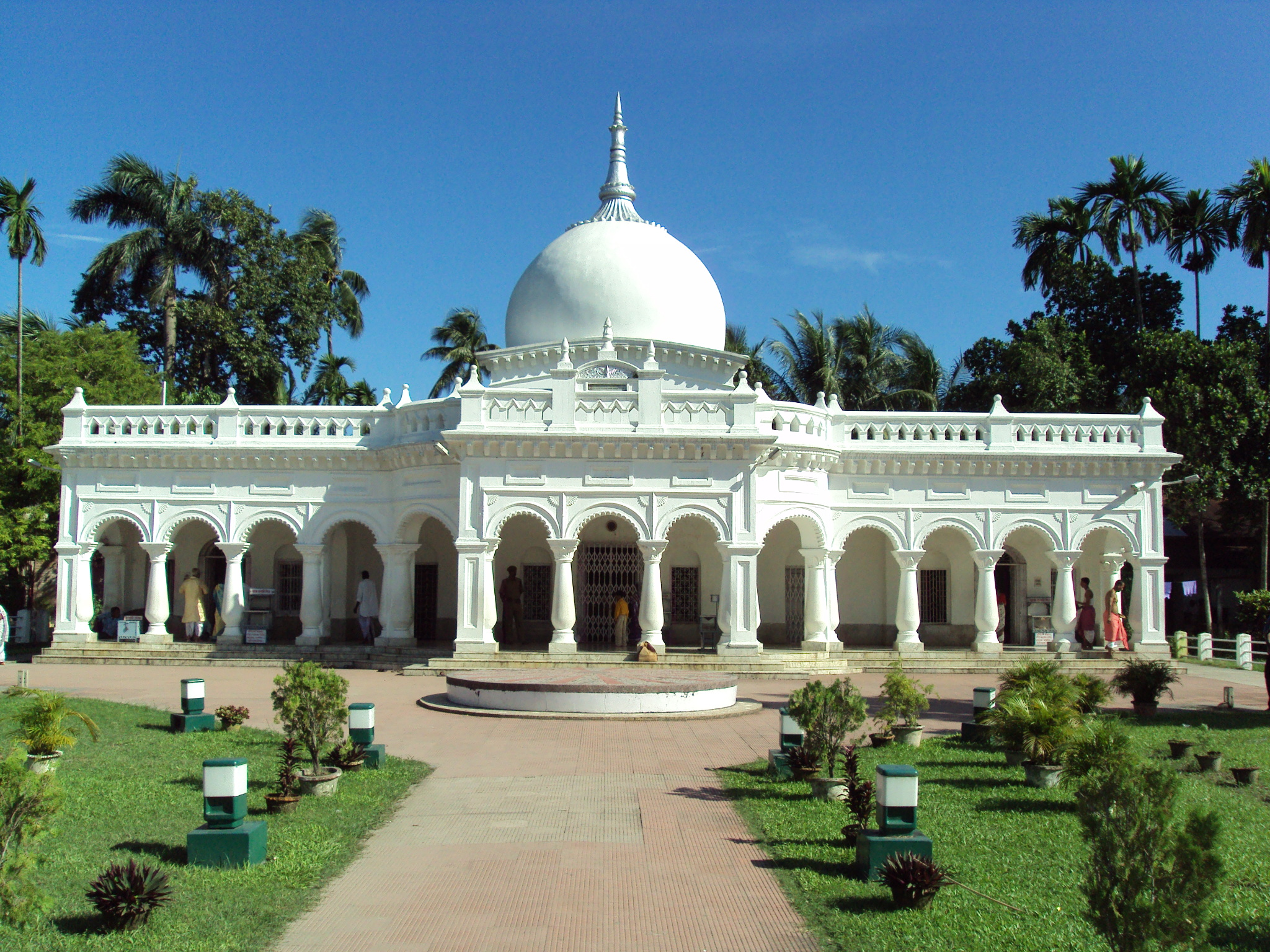
- Madan Mohan temple

- West Bengal

Religion
- Affiliation: Hinduism
- Deity: Madan Mohan: Raas Purnima; Rath Yatra; Raas Mela
- Governing body: Debuttor Trust Board

Location
- Location: Cooch Behar
- State: West Bengal
- Country: India
- Coordinates: 26.3204295°N 89.4453538°E

Architecture
- Type: Dalan style of Bengal temple architecture
- Creator: Maharaja Nripendra Narayan
- Established: 21 March 1990
- Completed: 1889

Madan Mohan temple is a Hindu temple dedicated to Lord Krishna, who is worshipped in the form of Madan Mohan in this temple. Maa Kali, Maa Tara and Maa Bhavani are the other major Hindu deities who are also worshipped in the temple.

Situated in the center of Cooch Behar town in Cooch Behar district of West Bengal, the temple has been a centerpiece of devotion and spiritual significance since its establishment in the late 19th century by Maharaja Nripendra Narayan of the Koch dynasty. Besides being a house of worship, the temple and its architecture also serve as a landmark in the timeline of Cooch Behar's princely state.

== History ==
Madan Mohan temple was established by Maharaja Nripendra Narayan of the Koch dynasty in the late 19th century. Madan Mohan is the kuladevata of the Koch dynasty and hence over time, Shree Madan Mohan also became the primely worshipped deity of most of the Hindu people in the Cooch Behar district. The temple was constructed over 5 years between 1885 and 1889. On 8 July 1889 Maharaja Nripendra Narayan laid the foundation stone of the temple. The temple was inaugurated by Rajmata Nishimoyee Devi in 21 March 1890. On the same day, Maharaja Nripendra Narayan inaugurated the Anandamoyee Dharamshala on the eastern premises of the temple.

== Madan Mohan ==
Madan Mohan is the principal deity of the temple and his deity is located in the central room, whose ceiling is carved in the form of a white lotus. There are two murtis of Madan Mohan are placed on a four stand chowdola. The larger one is known as the "Bara Madan Mohan" and the smaller one is known as the "Chhoto Madan Mohan". Devotees can have darshan of Bara Madan Mohan daily. Chhoto Madan Mohan stays behind and gives darshan to the devotees for only 3 days in a year. Madan Mohan's statue is made up of ashtadhatu and is painted with gold on it.

The statue was originally sculpted by Lord Shiva devotee Maharaja Nara Narayan. He was influenced by an Assamese Vaishnav preacher Sankardev. Though he preached to Maharaja about Madan Mohan, Radha was not a part of his preaching. Hence, the main sanctum sanctorum is without any image or deity of Radha. The statue of Madan Mohan is alone, which is a unique feature compared to most of the Radha Krishna temples.

== Deities worshipped ==
Madan Mohan is the principal deity of the temple, while several other deities are worshipped. A Shaligram Shila named Anantadeb or Ananta Narayan is worshipped prior the worship of Bara Madan Mohan. Two other shilas named Janaradhan Narayan and Lakshmi Narayan are also worshipped daily.

A black stone known as Maa Pat Devi or Pat Parvati, on which a das-bhuja avatar of Madan Mohan is drawn, is worshipped in Joytara temple. There is also a Banalinga in the shrine. There is a separate temple dedicated to Maa Bhavani on the eastern boundary of the temple complex. A brightly red coloured idol of das-bhuja Maa Bhavani killing an asura is worshipped in the temple.

Every year, a clay idol of Maa Durga is sculptured in the same style during the Durga Puja and she is worshipped in the Debibari. The eastern side of the temple complex also houses silver idols of Maa Katyayani, Maa Joytara and Maa Annapurna. On the west, a statue of Maa Anandamoyee Kali standing on Lord Shiva is also worshipped.

In the eastern room of the shrine, there are deities of several other Hindu gods and goddesses including a five-faced Ganesha statue, idols of Mangala Chandi, a idol of Mahishasura Mardini and a small idol of Mahakali.

Also in the western side of the complex is the Kathamiya temple, where each year Kathamiya durga puja is held. The durga puja is named Kathamiya because every year the same wooden structure or kathamo is built upon. Some other pujas too are held in that temple.

== Boro Tara ==
The "Boro Tara" puja is one of the oldest Kali pujas in Cooch Behar district, dating back to the time of the Cooch Behar royals. The puja takes place in the Madan Mohan temple complex and is more than 150 years old. The goddess is referred to as the Boro Tara by the local community. The puja is conducted by the Debuttor Trust Board, which is responsible for carrying out all the religious ceremonies in Cooch Behar which used to take place under the patronage of the Maharajas of Cooch Behar. Earlier, the puja was conducted in the royal palace by the Maharajas, but later it has been shifted to the Madan Mohan temple.

The puja involves five major and customary sacrifices. Goat, pigeon, duck, sheep and catfish are being sacrificed in the present times. Although, the ritual during the Maharaja's times was sacrificing tortoises, later it was replaced by catfishes in order to resolve the low count of tortoises. Besides, the goddess is also offered roasted "shol mach".

The idol of Boro Tara is black in colour and stands at ten-and-a-half hands. The weapons she helds in her 4 hands is a message for her devotees regarding the potential punishments which they could face if they commit any wrongs and sins. The weapons deviates from the usual Kali idol weapons. The deity holds a "kharga" in her right hand and a vessel filled with blood in her lower left hand, in place of the usual severed head. The upper left hand holds a floral structure while the lower right hand holds a spade-like structure. The Chitrakar family has been crafting this idol over generations.

After Lakshmi puja is performed, the crafting of the idol is started at the Kathamiya temple in the Madan Mohan temple complex. Every year, a large number of people gather on the day of puja. People visit during the puja and to offer anjali to the goddess. People also visit the temple in the evening to light lamps, agarbattis and offer food offerings to the deity on the day of the puja.

== The temple complex ==
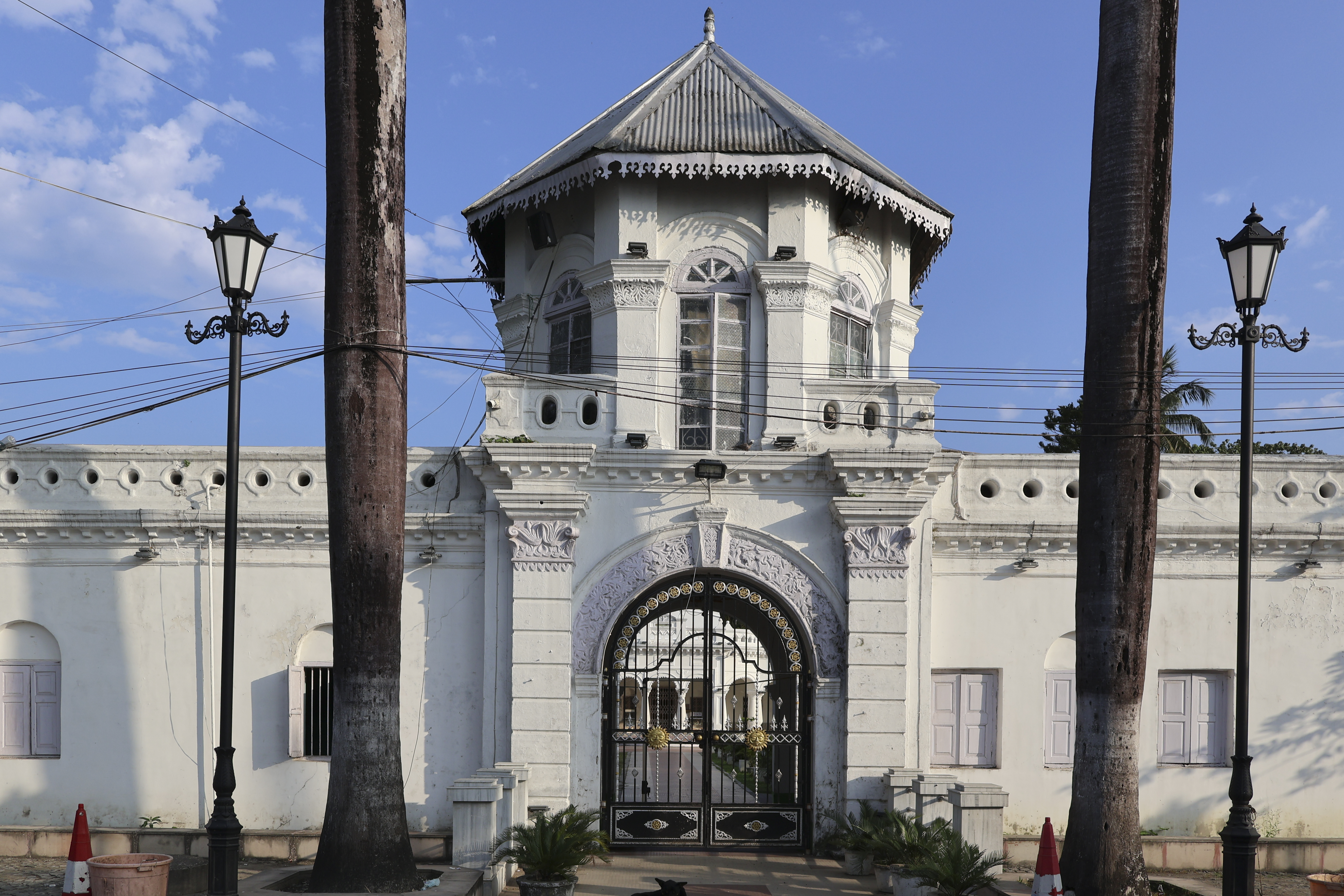
The Nahabat Khana (entrance gate) of Madan Mohan temple

The temple has char chala combined dalan style architecture, similar to most of the temples of Bengal architecture. Parts of the temple also shows influence from the British architecture, which is evident from the fact that Cooch Behar was a princely state under the Colonial British Rule. The temple has a dome built over the cornice of the four rooms side by side facing south. The ground has been maintained with a well designed grass field with several floral plants bordering the sides of the paths.

Besides Madan Mohan, several other deities are worshipped in the temple. A Shaligram Shila named Anantadeb or Ananta Narayan is worshipped everyday before the worship of Bara Madan Mohan. Two other shilas named Janaradhan Narayan and Lakshmi Narayan are also worshipped daily. On the cradle of Madan Mohan, there is black stone of seven inches length. It is known as the Maa Pat Devi or Pat Parvati. A das-bhuja avatar of Madan Mohan is drawn on the stone. This idol is worshipped in Joytara temple and after that, it is put back into the cradle. There is also a Banalinga in the shrine.

A separate temple dedicated to Maa Bhavani is situated on the eastern boundary of the Madan Mohan temple complex. A brightly red coloured idol of das-bhuja Maa Bhavani killing an asura is worshipped in the temple. The deity is 2 feet tall and is made of stone. In the eastern room of the shrine, there are deities of several other Hindu gods and goddesses. There is five-faced Lord Ganesha statue seated on a lion, two idols of Mangala Chandi, a idol of Mahishasura Mardini and a small idol of Mahakali. On the right hand after entrance, there are statues of Maa Durga and Mahadev seated on the stones.

Every year, a clay idol of Maa Durga is sculptured in the same style during the Durga Puja. She is worshipped in the Debibari. Slightly different from the conventional form of Durga, here the goddess can be seen riding a tiger on right and lion on the left, while killing an asura with her trishul. The temple complex also houses idols of Maa Katyayani, Maa Joytara and Maa Annapurna. They are present on the eastern side of the main temple complex. Seated on a throne, the three deities have been carved out of silver. The Western side of the temple complex houses a 4 feet tall statue of Maa Anandamoyee Kali, standing on the statue of Lord Shiva. This statue was established by Maharaja Harendra Narayan in 1831.

== Timings and Prasad ==
Everyday the temple is open for the devotees between 9 a.m. and 8 p.m. It anyone wants to offer bhog to the deities, the person will have to take a coupon of ₹10 from the temple committee and then offer the bhog. Every year, the temple receives donations of lakhs of rupees. After the Raas Utsav, the donations are being counted in a strong room under strict security, put in the temple's bank account and later used for the temple development and puja rituals. The temple received ₹5 lakhs donations during the Raas Mela in 2023 alone.

== Rath Yatra ==
The Rath Yatra of Madan Mohan temple is conducted as per the customs of the royal era. On the day of Rath Yatra, a special puja is conducted at the Kathamiya temple. After the puja is performed, the deity of Madan Mohan is placed on a chariot and it goes to Gunjabari, Cooch Behar. Accompanying Madan Mohan are the deities from Rajmata temple. They visit Madan Mohan's maternal aunt's house (Mashir Bari) at the Dangrai temple in Gunjabari, Cooch Behar.

The Royal representative gives a tug on the rope of the chariot, symbolising the beginning of the procession of Rath Yatra. Subsequently, thousands of local residents and devotees join the festival to pull the rope of the chariot, which is believed to cleanse a person from their sins. After traversing through the heart of the city, the procession arrives at Madan Mohan's aunt's house in the evening. After staying at his aunt's house for seven days, Madan Mohan returns to his house, at the Madan Mohan temple. The returning procession is known as the "Ulto Rath'. In this period, special pujas are offered in the Madan Mohan temple to Choto Madan Mohan. Additionally, a fair is organised in the Gunjabari area.

== Raas Chakra ==
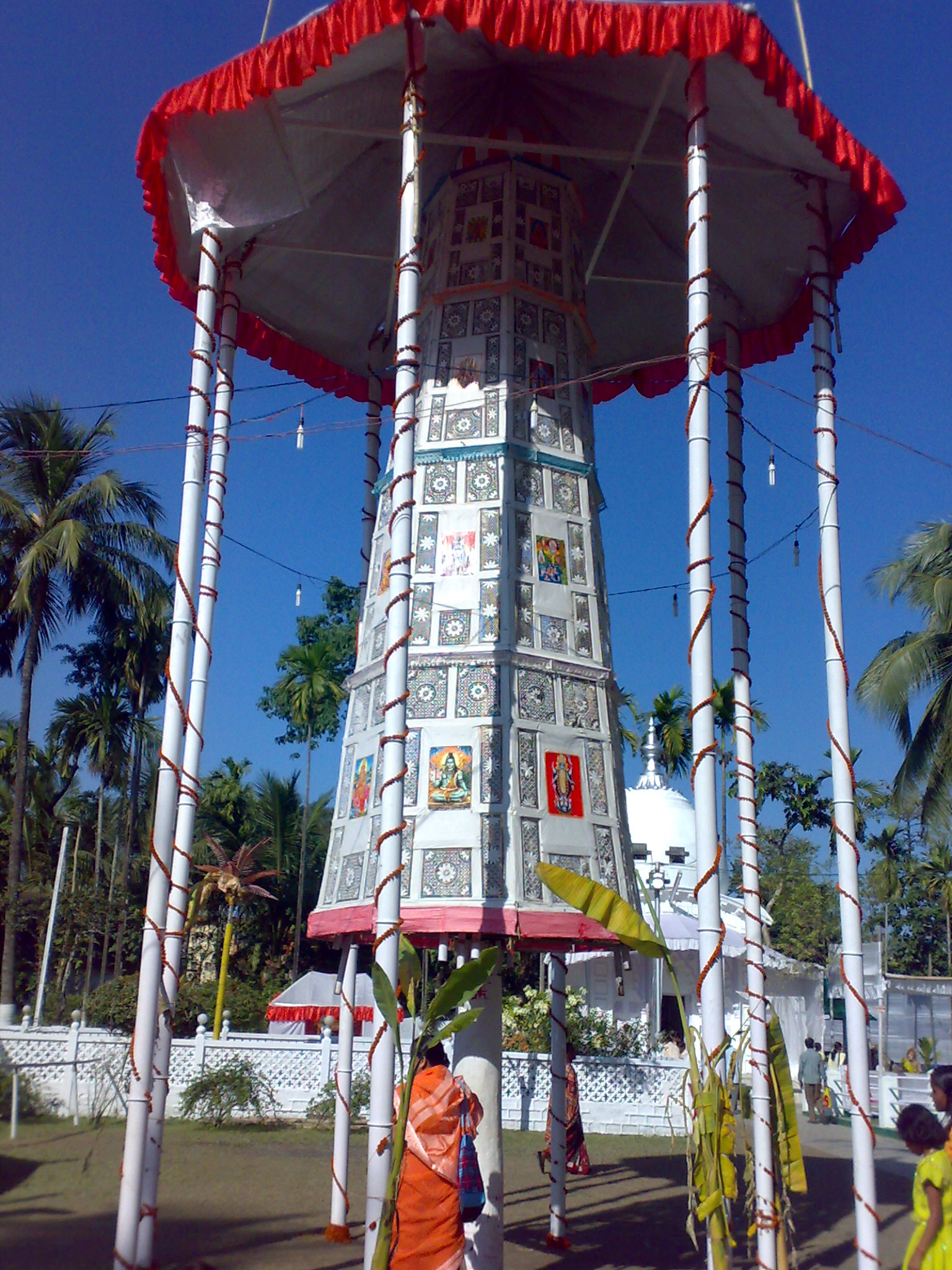
The Raas Chakra at the Raas Mela in Madan Mohan temple

The Raas Chakra or The Holy Wheel is a structure built during the Cooch Behar Rash Mela that is held in honour of Lord Madan Mohan. Every year the Raas Chakra is built by a group of artisans on behalf of the Debuttor Trust Board which organizes the Madan Mohan Raash Utsav. Every year, the Raas festival is started by the president of Cooch Behar Debottur Trust Board by swinging the Raas Chakra, which was done by the Maharajas earlier.

A symbol of secularism in the district, this Raas Chakra is built on the "Raas Danda". Every year, it is made by a family of muslim artisans from the Ghughumari area since three generations. The chakra is a straight log of "Saal Tree" that is kept submerged throughout the year in the waters of "Bairagi Dighi", which is situated adjacent to the Madan Mohan temple complex,each year it is recovered before the festival by Debuttor Trust Board .

The Raas-Danda measures 34 ft in length with 30 ft above the ground and 4 feet below the ground. On all sides with the support of the Raas Danda, a structure is made with wooden posts, bamboo and colourful papers, creating in a 15–20 ft wide conically tapering semi-cylindrical structure to form the entire Raash-Chakra. Before turning the Chakra, the "pasar" is broken by a priest.

The height of holding bars are typically 7 feet above the ground and all devotees, tourists visit the Madan Mohan temple during Raash Mela to rotate the Raas Chakra, which is believed to provide bliss and happiness. The religious symbolisms of Hinduism and Buddhism are inbuilt in the design of Raas Chakra with the semi-cylindrical structure resembling the Dharma Chakra of the Buddhism and the motifs of Hindu gods and goddesses ornamenting the Raas Chakra on all sides representing Sanatan Hinduism.

== Raas Utsav and Raas Mela ==
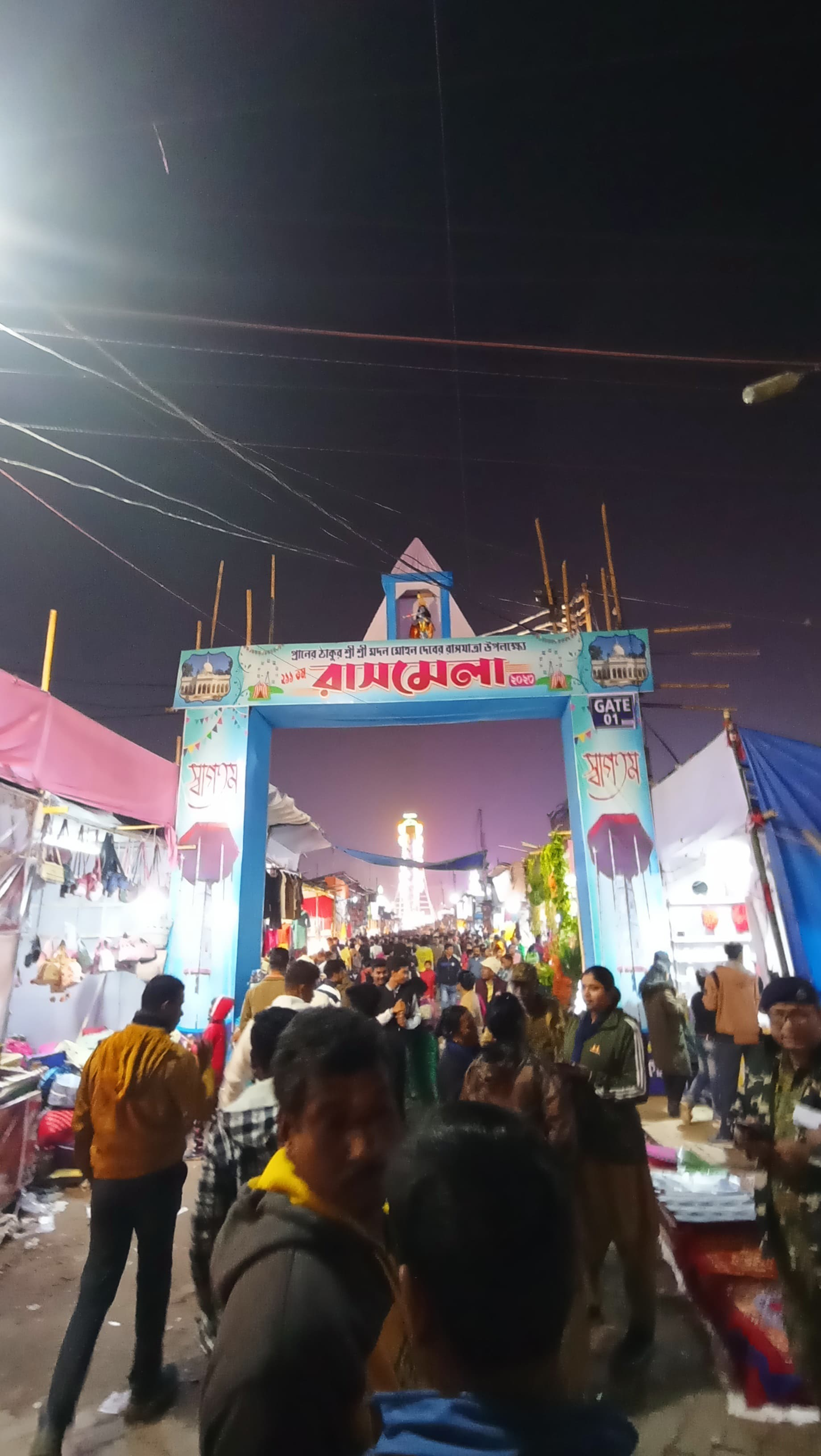
Cooch Behar Raas Mela entrance in 2023

The Raas Utsav and its accompanying Raas Mela is one of the largest annual celebrations and public event in North Bengal. Started by the Cooch Behar royals, the tradition is more than 212 years old. The fair was first started in 1812 by Maharaja Harendra Narayan on Raas Purnima, the day on which he entered the new royal palace at Bhetaguri. Every year, while the festival is held at the Madan Mohan temple complex, the fair is held in the Raasmela ground. Earlier, although the fair took place for over a month during the royals' time, the span has reduced over the years and occurs for over a fortnight in the recent years.

The Raas Mela is also marked by the construction of idols of several characters from the Hindu epics Mahabharata and Ramayana. Another principal attraction is a 15 ft statue of the Putana demoness, which is being constructed over a time of two weeks every year. Made of twigs and soil, it is demolished every year, as a sign of the victory of good over the evil, right over the wrong and dharma over adharma. Kirtans and jagratas are organised during the night.

A fair is held in the ground which includes amusement rides like ferris wheel, mini-roller coasters and many others. Besides this, food stalls, handicraft stores, book stalls, household goods stalls, clothing stores and street game setups are organised. Traders from the neighbouring countries including Nepal, Bhutan and from the adjoining Indian states of Bihar, Sikkim, Assam and Arunachal Pradesh also visit the event every year. Apart from these, a concert stage is set up in the center of the ground which hosts numerous artists' performances.

In 2017, a musical fountain was inaugurated at Bairagi Daghi, the waterbody located opposite to the Madan Mohan temple. Bairagi Dighi is one of the important ponds in Cooch Behar besides the Sagar Dighi, which were dug by the royals. The pond is visited by the devotees who pray at the temple. Made on a budget of ₹3 crore, it was jointly funded by the North Bengal Development Department and West Bengal State Tourism Department, in order to boost the number of devotees during Raas Utsav.

In 2020, for the fist time ever, the fair was cancelled and not conducted to prevent any surge in the then ongoing Covid 19 infections. Like every year, the festival was conducted but the fair was not organised owing to the then ongoing pandemic situation. Special guidelines like wearing masks and using sanitizer were issued by the temple committee for the devotees who went to visit the temple in that period. But, to maintain the spirit, a small "Shilpi Mela" was organised at the local stadium with 200 odd stalls, unlike the usual thousands of stall at the regular Raas Mela.

After Ulto Rath, Bara Madan Mohan returns to his house after being in his "Mashir bari". At that time, Choto Madan Mohan goes to sleep for four months. After being in a deep sleep for 4 months, Choto Madan Mohan wakes up every year on the day of Uthhan Ekadashi. He is bathed with 108 ghatis of milk, water, ghee and honey each. After the bathing rituals are completed, special puja is performed. Thousands of devotees from all over Bengal and Eastern India visit the temple on this day. The deity of Choto Madan Mohan is brought to the main temple and he is worshipped there. It is one of the 3 times in a year, when devotees get darshan of Choto Madan Mohan. During this period of Raas, Bara Madan Mohan remains outside the main temple and Choto Madan Mohan is worshipped in place of him.
