= Vishalakshi Temple =

Hindu goddess temple in Varanasi, India

- Sri Sri 108 Kashi Vishalakshi Temple
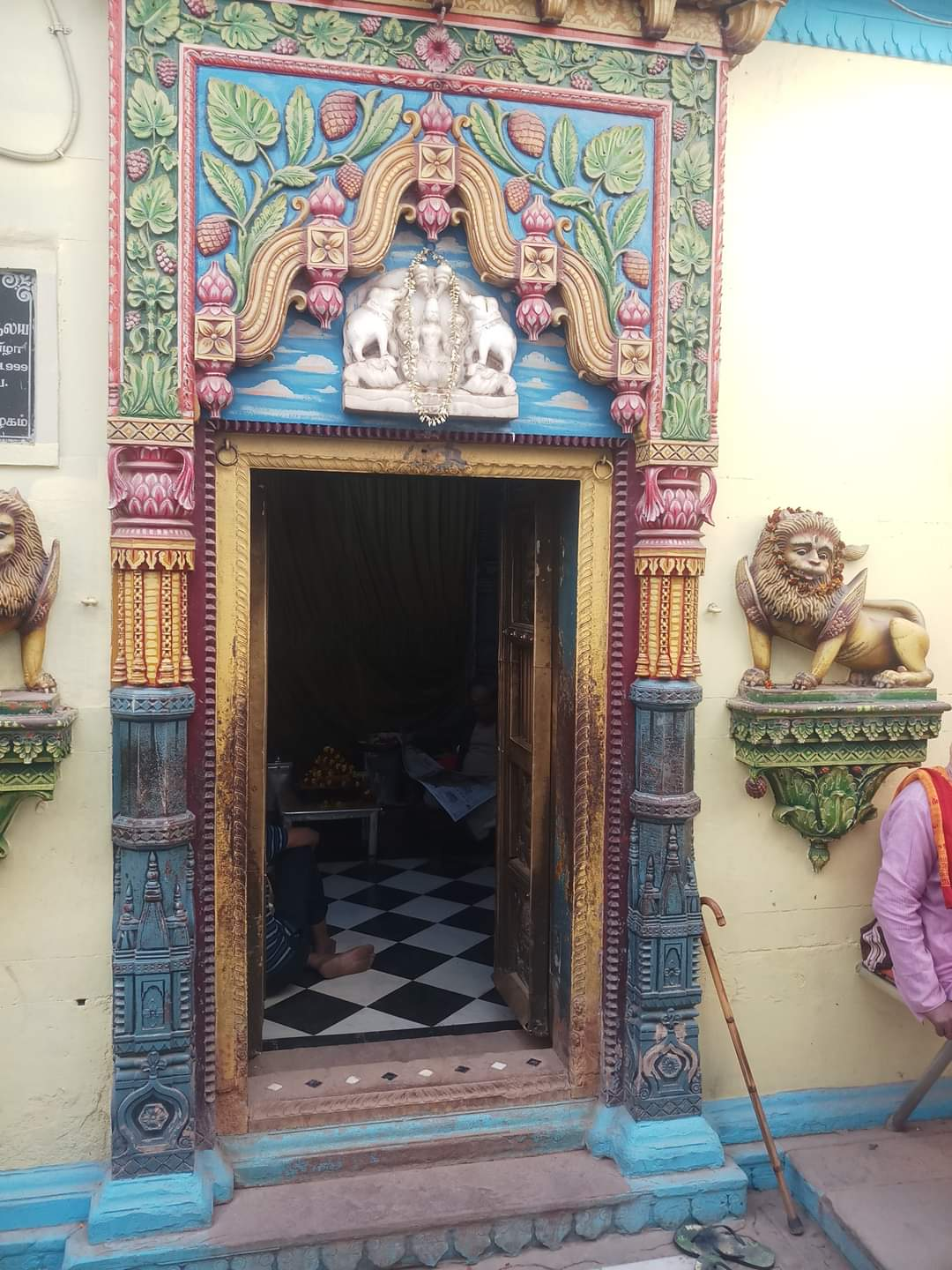
- Entrance to the temple

- Location within Uttar Pradesh

Religion
- Affiliation: Hinduism
- District: Varanasi
- Deity: Visalakshi

Location
- Location: Mir Ghat, Varanasi
- State: Uttar Pradesh
- Country: India
- Coordinates: 25°18′32″N 83°0′39″E

Architecture
- Creator: Nagarathar
- Completed: 1893
- Inscriptions: In Tamil

The Vishalakshi Devi Temple (Viśālākṣī Amman Kōyil), also known as Vishalakshi Gauri Mandir, is a Hindu temple in Varanasi dedicated to the goddess Parvati. It is regarded as one of the 51 Shakti Pithas, where Shakti is worshipped as Vishalakshi Devi and Bhairava as Kaal Bhairav. The temple is believed to mark the site where the gem from Sati’s right earring (manikarṇa) fell; consequently, the goddess is also known as Manikarni Devi.

The present temple was rebuilt and has been maintained since the 19th century by the Nattukottai Nagarathars, a mercantile community from Tamil Nadu. Built in a haveli-like North Indian style, it incorporates South Indian religious architectural features, including a modest Dravidian-style gopura. Its principal festival is Kajali Teej, observed in the waning fortnight of Bhadrapada.

== Location ==
Vishalakshi Temple is situated near Mir Ghat, Varanasi. It is situated 250 metres (0.16 mi) north west of the Kashi Vishwanath Temple and 200 metres (0.12 mi) of Annapurna Temple.

== Religious significance ==
Vishalakshi (Viśālākṣī; Sanskrit: विशालाक्षी, “she who has large eyes”) is an epithet of the goddess Parvati. The name is derived from the Sanskrit words viśāla (“wide” or “large”) and akṣi (“eyes”); Parvati is described by this epithet in the Shiva Purana when Shiva first sees her.

Annapurna, the goddess of food and a form of Parvati, is given the epithet Vishalakshi, the "wide-eyed". Her most famous temple stands at Varanasi, where patron goddess she is considered. The Skanda Purana narrates the tale of the sage Vyasa cursing Varanasi, as no one in the city offered him food. Finally, Vishalakshi appears in the form of a housewife and grants food to Vyasa. This role of Vishalakshi is similar to that of Annapurna, who offers food to her husband Shiva, whose hunger can be satiated by her food. Shiva gratified by Annapurna's food, establishes Varanasi and appoints her as its presiding goddess. The goddess Vishalakshi of the Varanasi temple may have been identified with Annapurna in early times, however over time became a distinct goddess, resulting in the two separate goddess temples.

In the Kashi Khanda of the Skanda Purana, Vishalakshi accompanies Vishwanath (a form of Shiva venerated in Kashi Vishwanath Temple) to grant a boon to the god Kubera. Another chapter from Kashi Khanda also offers her exultation. It also mentions that Vishalakshi fulfills the desires of men and women looking for liberation.

In the sacred geography of Varanasi, six points are said to symbolize Shastanga (six-fold) yoga, which is performing by visiting the six sites. They are the Vishwanath Temple (the most important temple of Varanasi - dedicated to Shiva), the Vishalakshi Temple, the Ganges, the Kala Bhairava temple (dedicated to Varanasi's guardian deity and Vishalakshi's Bhiarava), the Dhundiraj Temple (dedicated to the god Ganesha - son of Shiva and Parvati) and the Dandapani temple (dedicated to an aspect of Shiva).

=== Shakti Pitha ===
Vishalakshi (Sanskrit: विशालाक्षी) or Varanasi figures in most standard lists of Shakti Pithas.

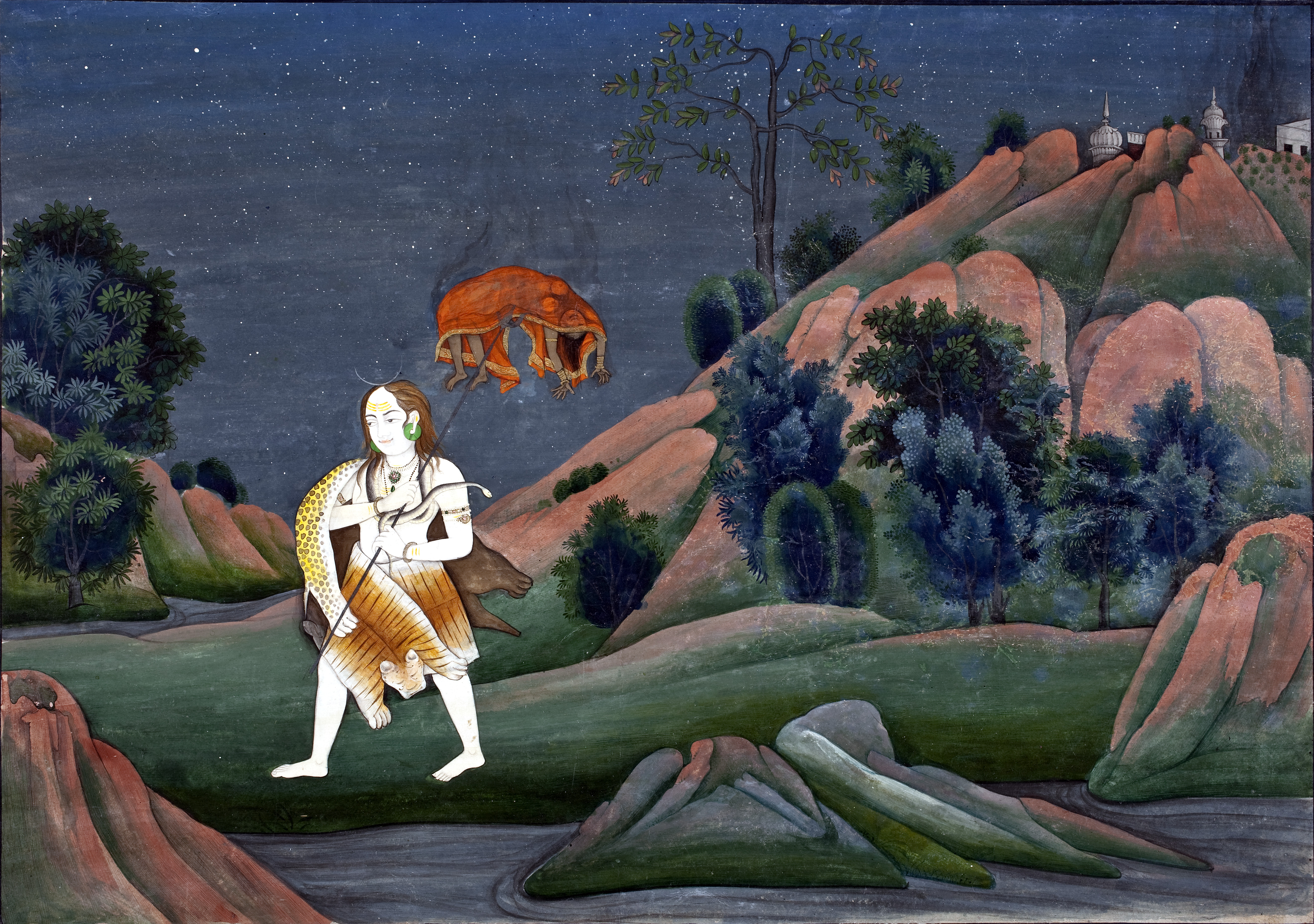
Shiva carrying the corpse of Sati.

The daughter of Prajapati Daksha, Sati was married to the god Shiva against his wishes. Daksha organized a great yajna, but did not invite Sati and Shiva. Uninvited, Sati reached the yajna-site, where Daksha ignored Sati and vilified Shiva. Unable to withstand this insult, Sati jumped into the sacrificial fire and committed suicide. Sati died, but her corpse did not burn. Shiva (as Virabhadra) slew Daksha for being responsible for Sati's death and forgave him, resurrecting him. The wild, grief-stricken Shiva wandered the universe with Sati's corpse. Finally, the god Vishnu dismembered the body of Sati into 51 parts, each of which became a Shakti Pitha, temple to a form of the Goddess. Shiva is also worshipped at each Shakti Pitha in the form of Bhairava, the male counterpart or guardian of the presiding goddess of the Pitha. Sati's eye or earring is believed to have fallen at Varanasi, establishing Vishalakshi as a Shakti Pitha.

The Tantric work Rudrayamala, composed before 1052 CE, mentions 10 principal Shakti Pithas, which includes Varanasi as the fifth one. The Kularnava Tantra mentions 18 Pithas and mentions Varanasi as the sixth one. The Ashadashapitha (18 Pithas) ascribed to Shankaracharya (interpreted as Adi Shankara, however probably Shankara Agamacharya, Bengali author of the Tara-rahasya-vrittika) enumerates 18 names along with their presiding deities or Pitha-devis including Vishalakshi of Varanasi as the fifth Pitha. In the Kubjika Tantra, Varanasi is third in 42 names. There are the two lists of Pithas in the Jnanarnava, one with 8 names and the other with fifty names. The 8-name list does not mention Varanasi, but the other list names Varanasi in the second spot. Vishalakshi of Varanasi is mentioned as first of 108 Shakti Pithas in the list in the Devi Bhagavata Purana. The face of Sati is described to have fallen here. This is the only instance where a body part is related to the Shakti Pitha in the text. The Devi Gita within the same text gives a long list of Pithas, where Vishalakshi is mentioned as dwelling in Avimukta (Varanasi). No body part is related to the Pitha in this list. In the non-scripture 16th century Bengali work Chandimangal, Mukundaram lists nine Pithas in the Daksha-yajna-bhanga section. Varanasi is the last Pitha described to be the place where Sati's chest fell and the presiding goddess being Vishalakshi. Lakshmidhara also includes Vishalakshi in his 12th-century list.

The Pithanirnaya or Mahapithanirupana section from the Tantrachudamani originally listed 43 names, but names were added over time making it 51 Pithas. It details the Pitha-devata or Devi (name of goddess at the Pitha), the Kshastradishas (Bhairava, consort of the goddess) and the anga-pratyanga (limbs including ornaments of Sati). Manikarnika at Varanasi with Vishalakshi as the presiding goddess comes in at number 23. A kundala (earring) is the anga-pratyanga and Kala-Bhairava (Kala) is the consort. In some later versions of the text, Varanasi is not included in the chief 51/52 Pithas. In one of the versions, it is demoted from a Pitha to an upa-Pitha (subordinate Pitha). Here, the kundala is said to be anga-pratyanga, but two Pitha-devatas and Bhairavas are mentioned. First, Vishalakshi with Kala-Bhairava and secondary Annapurna with Vishweshvara. Vishweshvara is the presiding deity of Kashi Vishwanath Temple, the most important temple in Varanasi and the Annapurna temple is nearby.

=== Vishalakshi worship in Tamil Nadu ===
Vishalakshi or Visalakshi (also known as Visalatchi), the "wide-eyed" goddess is often associated with two other goddesses: Kamakshi, the "love-eyed" goddess of Kanchipuram and Minakshi, the "fish-eyed" deity of Madurai, prominently because of their similar names. Together the three are regarded as the most important Goddess temples by Tamil-speaking populations. While Vishalakshi dwells in Northern India, the other goddess temples are in the present-day state of Tamil Nadu, in Southern India. Tamil people venerated Vishalakshi for ages and have strong ties with the temple.

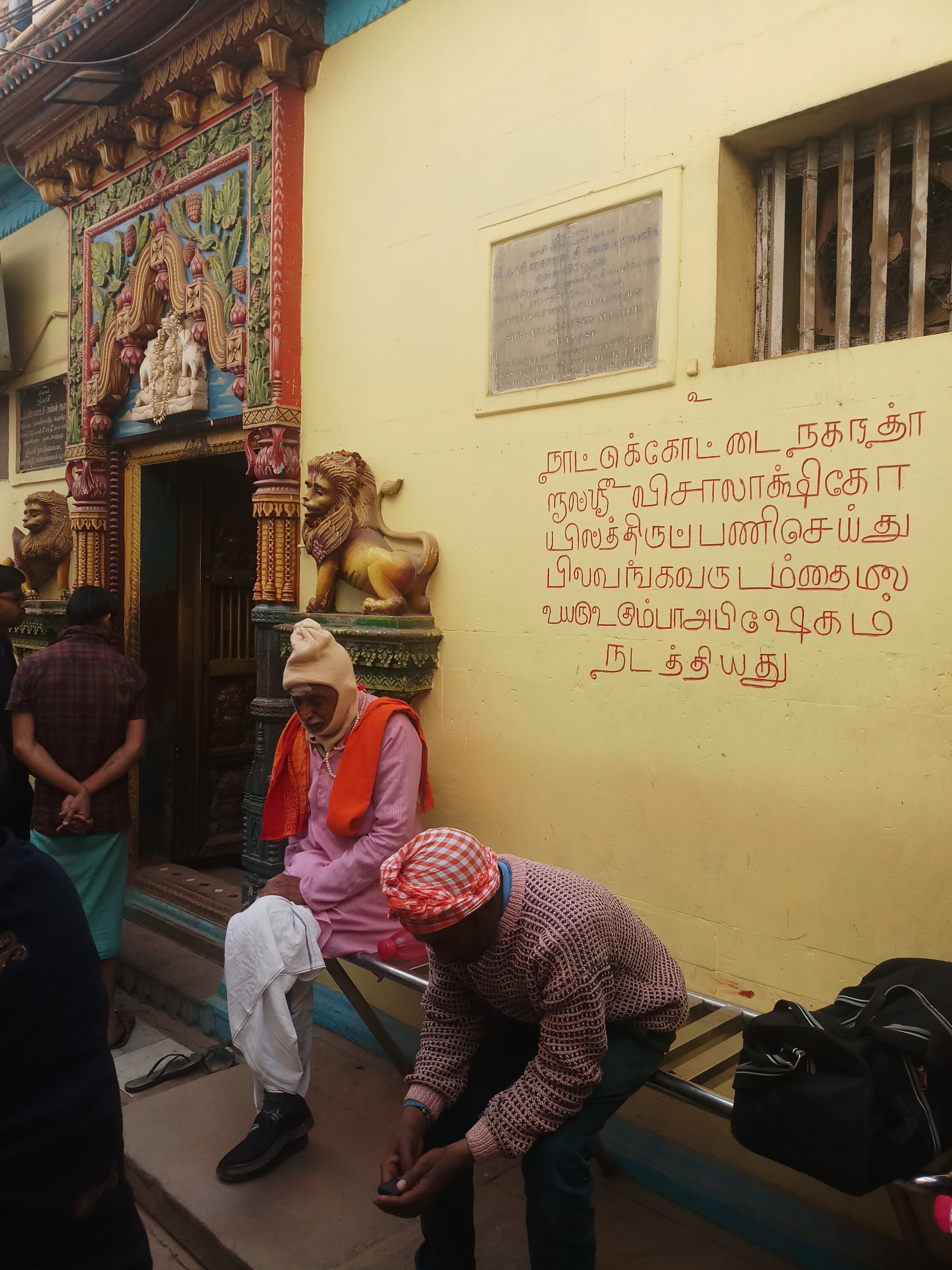
A Tamil inscriptions shows consecration ceremony of temple.

The current structure of the temple was built in 1893 by the Nattukottai Nagarathars, a mercantile community from Southern Tamil Nadu (the Chettinad region, in the erstwhile Madura and Ramnad countries).

== Worship and festivals ==
Devotees often bathe in the holy Ganges nearby before offering worship at the temple. The puja (worship), offerings, recitation of hymns to the goddess and charity at the temple is considered highly fruitful because of the power of the presiding goddess. The goddess is especially worshipped by unmarried girls for a groom, childless couples for progeny and unfortunate women for the turn of their fortune. Two goddess images are housed side by side in the garbhagirha (sanctum): a smaller black stone image called Adi Vishalakshi on left back side and another taller black stone image installed at a later date. Devotees often visit the Vishwanath and Annapurna shrines with this temple.

Two most important festivals in the temple, as well as all other goddess temples in Varanasi, is two Navaratris ("nine nights"). The Ashwin Navatri or simply called Navaratri, culminating in Vijayadashami, falls in the waxing fortnight of the Hindu month of Ashwin (October) and celebrates the victory of the goddess Durga on the buffalo-demon Mahishasura. The other Navaratri is in the waxing fortnight of Chaitra (March). On each of nine days, one of Varanasi's goddess temples – corresponding to one of the Navadurga (nine Durgas) or nine Gauris (Parvatis) – is recommended to be visited. The nine-temple circuit is described in various Kashi mahatmyas (texts narrating the greatness of the holy city of Varanasi/Kashi). Devotees flock to the temple in the evening of the fifth day of Navatri.

The yearly temple festival of Vishalakshi Temple is celebrated on Kajali Tij (Black Third), the third lunar day (tij) of the waning fortnight in Bhadrapada, the last month of the Indian rainy season. Women sing "amorous" rainy season songs called kajali (black) around this time. The holy day is observed especially for the welfare of brothers by women.

== See also ==
- Hindu temples in Varanasi
