= Rashchakra =

Structure built during Raash Mela

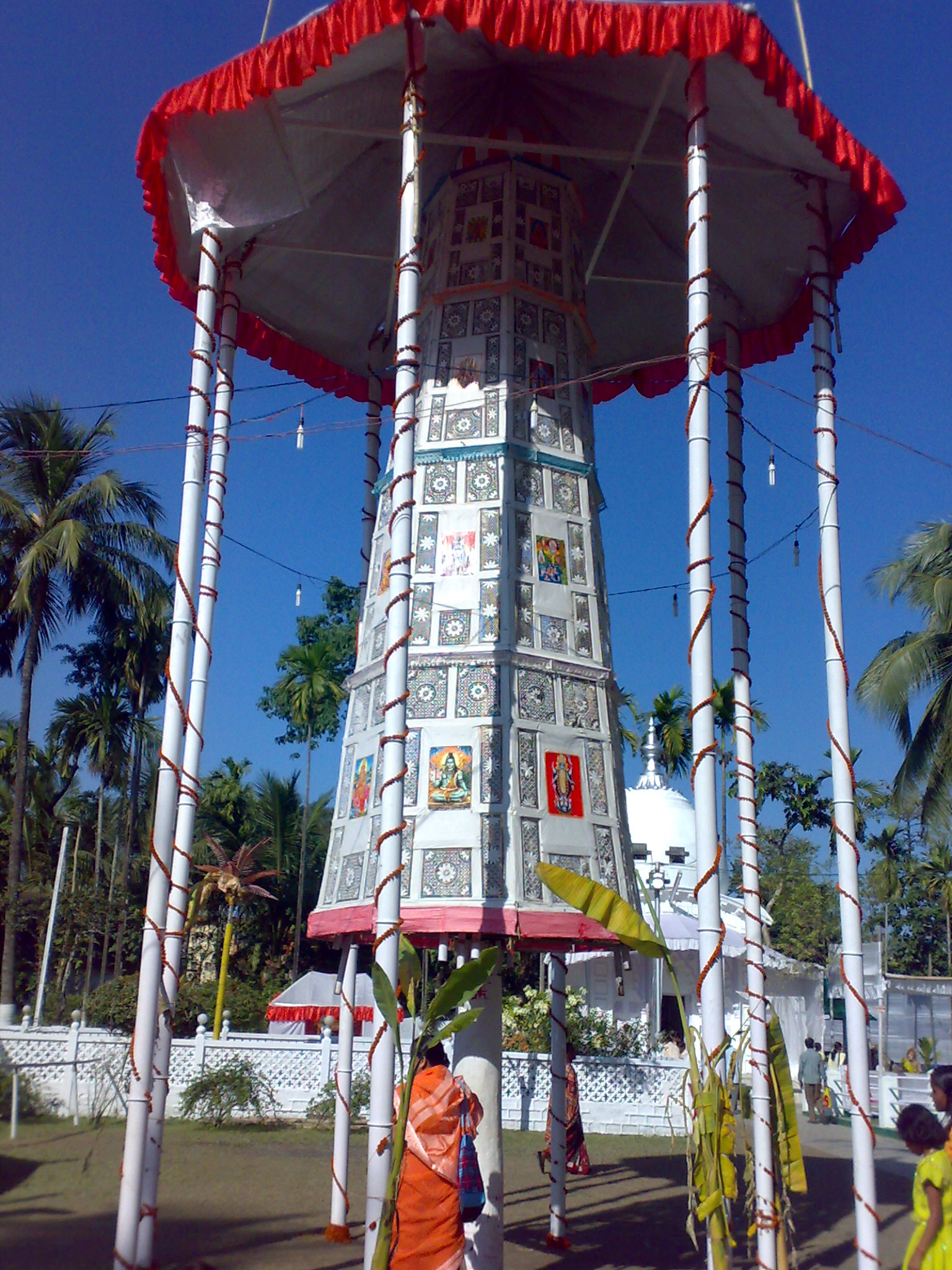
The Rash Chakra (Wheel) during the Raash Mela in Madan Mohan Temple, Cooch Behar

The Raash-Chakra or The Holy Wheel is a structure built during the Cooch Behar Rash Mela that is held in honour of Lord Madan Mohan, the avatar of Lord Krishna in Cooch Behar, West Bengal in India. Every year the Raash-Chakra built by a group of artisans on behalf of the Debuttor Trust Board which organizes the Lord Madan Mohan Raash Utsav. The Raash Mela is held centering around the Lord Madan Mohan Raash Utsav at the Madan Mohan Temple and the Raash Mela spreads out around the temple in its adjacent areas up to Rash Mela Ground, Cooch Behar.

== The chakra and its significance ==
A symbol of secular mood in the district, this Raash-Chakra is built on the Raash-Danda which is a straight log of Saal Tree that is kept submerged throughout the year before the festival by "Debuttor Trust Board in the water of Bairagi Dighi" that is situated adjacent to the Cooch Behar's Madan Mohan Temple.

The Raas-Danda measures 34 ft in length and when installed to form the backbone and pivot of Raash-Chakra it measures around 30 ft tall above ground and 4 feet below ground. Drawing out on all sides with the support of the Raash-Danda, a structure is made with wooden posts, bamboo and paper resulting in a 15–20 ft width conically tapering semi-cylindrical structure to form the entire Raash-Chakra. The structure revolves around the pivot of Raash-Danda and symbolizes brotherhood across religious diversity.

The religious symbolisms of Hinduism, Buddhism and Islam are inbuilt in the design of Raash-Chakra with the semi-cylindrical structure resembling the Dharma Chakra of the Buddhism, the motifs of Hindu Gods and Goddesses ornamenting the Raash-Chakra on all sides representing Sanatana Hinduism and the Tazia at the top of Raash-Chakra symbolizing Islam. The fact that the Raash-Chakra is traditionally built every year by both Hindu and Muslim artisans working together on behalf of the Debuttor Trust Board in itself is a symbol of harmony. This Raash-Chakra is decorated with paper floral designs and different pictures of Gods and Goddesses. The height of holding bars are typically 7 feet above the ground and all devotees, tourists and visitors visiting the Madan Mohan Temple during Raash Mela to rotate the Raash-Chakra to attain bliss and happiness.

== History ==
The Rash Mela is perhaps the grandest of all festivals which are celebrated all throughout the year in Cooch Behar. It attracts large crowds of people not only from all over the district of Cooch Behar, but also from neighboring districts including adjacent state of Assam and Tripura. According to local history, in 1812 AD Maharaja Harenda Narayan shifted his Kingdom's capital and entered his Palace at Bhetaguri on the auspicious day of Raash Purnima. The celebration began from that year.

The Raash-Chakra is made by Hindu artisans and Muslim artisans. The Muslim artisans are of a family of Ghughumari area since three generations. Before that it was built by other artisans. The fair began being organized over time around the celebration of Raash Purnima by the Maharaja. Later, in 1889 Maharaja Nripendra Narayan constructed the Madan Mohan Temple at Cooch Behar. Prior to this itself the capital had been shifted some decades ago to Cooch Behar. In 1890, the Maharaja seated Lord Madan Mohan at the Madan Mohan Temple at Cooch Behar and Raash Mela started being organized at the present venue around Madan Mohan Temple in Cooch Behar and the Raash-Chakra started being installed at the Madan Mohan Temple during Lord Madan Mohan's Raash Mela.

== Rash Mela ==
Over the years, the fair increased in significance and became the largest fair and festival in the region, and being held annually from the full moon night of Raash Purnima till the new moon. After the end of Koch Dynasty, the functions of the Maharaja are performed at Raash Mela by the District Magistrate, Cooch Behar who is also the President of Debottar Trust Board. The District Magistrate, Cooch Behar offers Pujo/Yajna to Lord Madan Mohan and rotates the Raash Chakra at the ordained time on the prescribed date, which marks the beginning of the Raash Mela Festival and fair. Among all the District Magistrates in the history of Cooch Behar, Sri Pawan Kadyan, IAS has the distinction of performing the ceremonial traditional offering of Pujo/Yagna to Lord Madan Mohan and rotating the Raash Chakra to inaugurate the Raash Mela the most number of times, 4 (four) times. The fair is held beside Madan Mohan Temple near Bairagi Dighi area.

During the fair, the areas around Sagadighi, Bairagidighi, Rifle Club Road, Maharaja Biswasingha Road and Madanmohan Mandir are filled with devotees and visitors. The fair brings together local folk art and crafts. Handicrafts made from bamboo, wood, stone and metal are in high demand. Many cultural programmes are also organised during the Raash Mela. The official duration of the fair runs from the full moon to the new moon. The District Magistrate of Cooch Behar extends the fair by a few days each year to accommodate devotees and visitors who travel from far and wide. The Raash Mela has developed a tradition of its own. It holds a separate identity in the hearts and minds of the people of Cooch Behar for its uniqueness and intangible heritage significance.
