= Annada Mangal =

Bengali poem (1752–53) eulogizing Hindu goddess Annapurna

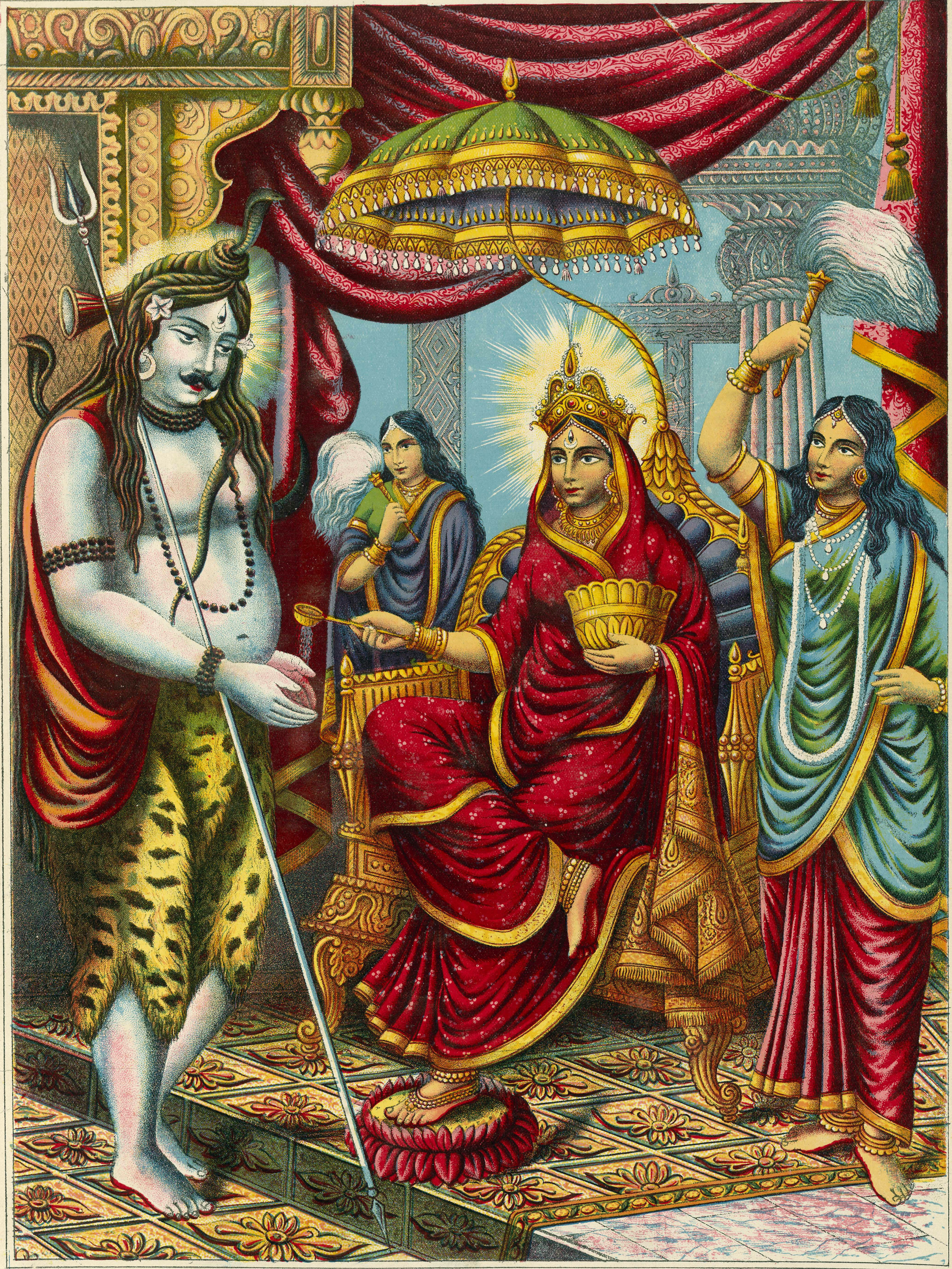
Annapurna (sitting on throne) giving alms to Shiva (standing at left), a scene from Annada Mangal, colour lithograph, 1895.

Annada Mangal (Bengali: অন্নদামঙ্গল), or Nutan Mangal (Bengali: নূতনমঙ্গল), is a Bengali narrative poem in three parts by Bharatchandra Ray, written in 1752–53. It eulogizes Hindu goddess Annapurna, a form of Parvati, worshipped in Bengal. It is the only poem in the medieval Mangalkavya tradition that does not create a separate subgenre, as no other poet ever ventured to praise Annapurna in their works.

Annada Mangal is divided into three Books: Annada Mangal or Annada Mahatmya, Bidya Sundar or Kalika Mangal and Mansingh or Annapurna Mangal. Annada Mangal or Annada Mahatmya has three separate narratives. The first narrative describes the stories of Shiva and Dakshayani, the birth of Parvati, the marriage of Shiva and Parvati, the founding of Varanasi and Parvati's staying in Varanasi as Annapurna. The second narrative describe Vyasa's attempt to found Vyasakashi and his subsequent failure while the third narrative describes the story of Hari Hor and Bhabananda Majumdar, the ancestors of Krishna Chandra Roy, king of Nadia and Bharatchandra's patron. Bidya Sundar, borrowed from the legend of Princess Bidya of Bardhaman and Prince Sundar of Kanchi, is a popular love story, which, in later years, was frequently adopted for stage. This part belongs to Kalika Mangal, a minor subgenre of Mangalkavya. Mansingh or Annapurna Mangal is a historical narrative of Mansingh, Bhabananda Majumdar and Pratapaditya of Jessore.

The narratives are borrowed from various puranic text, chronicles and legends including Kashi Khanda Upapurana, Markandeya Purana, Bhagavat Purana, Chaurapanchashika by Bilhana, Kshitishvangshavali Charitam as well as popular hearsays. A lively use of Sanskrit metres and rhetoric is found in the poem.

The surviving manuscripts of the text were dated from 1776 to 1829. Annada Mangal was first published by Ganga Kishore Bhattacharya in 1816. Iswar Chandra Vidyasagar’s edition of the poem (1853) is now considered as the standard one. Some of its older manuscripts are now preserved at the British Museum in London, Bibliothèque nationale de France in Paris, Asiatic Society and Vangiya Sahitya Parishad in Kolkata.
