= Annapurna (goddess) =

Hindu goddess of food and nourishment

- Goddess of Food and Nourishment
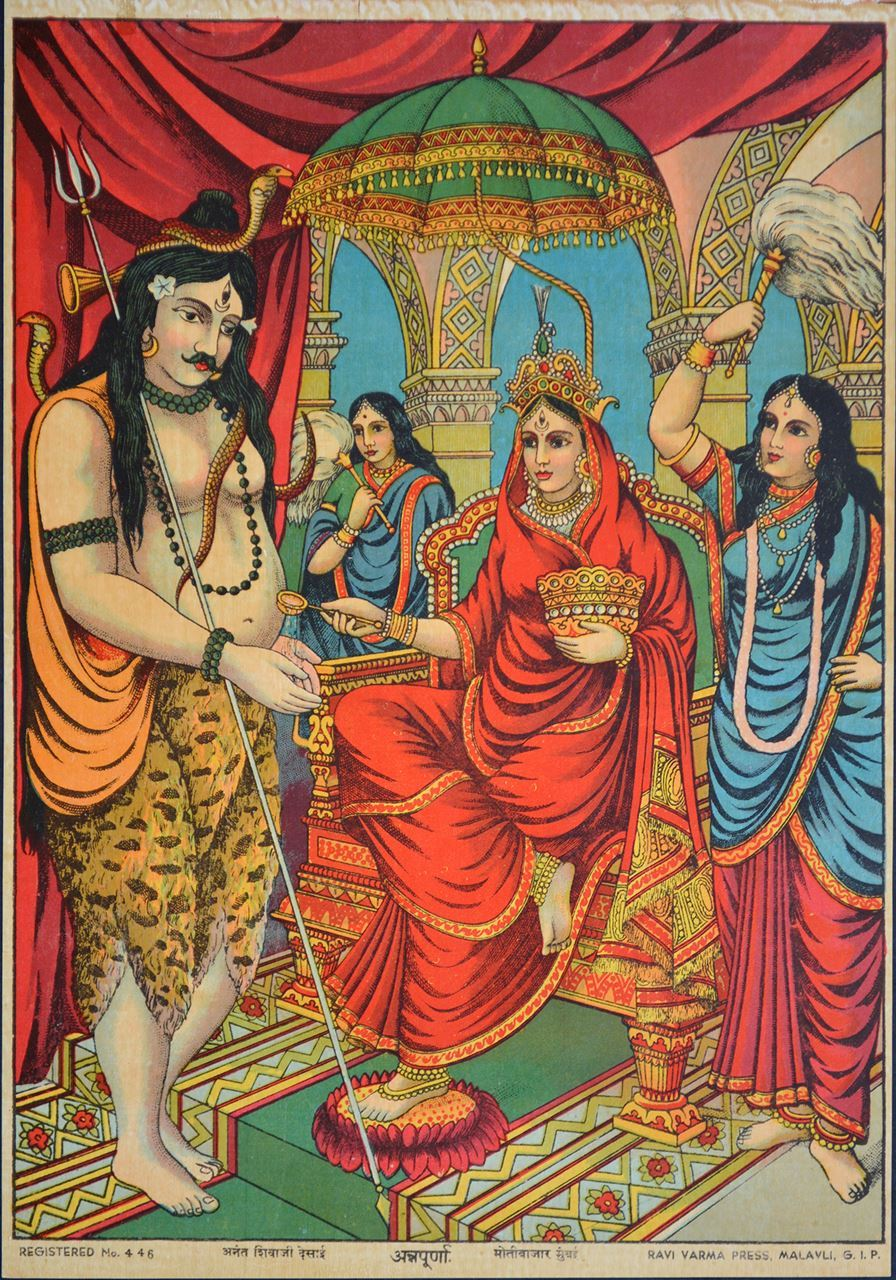
- Annapurna (Parvati), sitting on the throne, giving alms to Shiva
- Sanskrit transliteration: Annapūrṇa
- Sanskrit: अन्नपूर्णा
- Affiliation: Parvati, Devi, Durga, Adi Parashakti
- Abode: Mount Kailash
- Mantra: Om Annapūrne Sadāpūrne Śankara Prāna Vallabhe Jnyāna Vairāghya Siddhyātam Bhikśām Dehī Ća Pārvatī
- Symbol: Pot, Ladle
- Day: Friday
- Consort: Shiva

Annapurna, Annapurneshvari, Annada, or Annapoorna (Sanskrit: अन्नपूर्णा, IAST: Annapūrṇā, lit. filled with or possessed of food) is the Hindu goddess of food and nourishment and a manifestation of Parvati.

== Nomenclature ==
Annapurna is derived from Sanskrit and means, "the giver of food and nourishment". Anna means "food" or "grains" and pūrṇa means "full, complete and perfect."

The other names of Annapurna are:

- Viśālākshī (Sanskrit: विशालाक्षी) – she who has large eyes.
- Viśvaśakti (Sanskrit: विश्वशक्ति) – world power.
- Viśvamātā (Sanskrit: विश्वमाता) – mother of the world.
- Sṛṣtihetukāvaradānī (Sanskrit: सृष्टिहेतुकावरदानी) – she who is a boon granter for the sake of the world.
- Bhuvaneśvarī (Sanskrit: भुवनेश्वरी) – goddess of earth.
- Renu – goddess of Atom.
- Annadā (Sanskrit: अन्नदा) – donor of food.

== Iconography ==
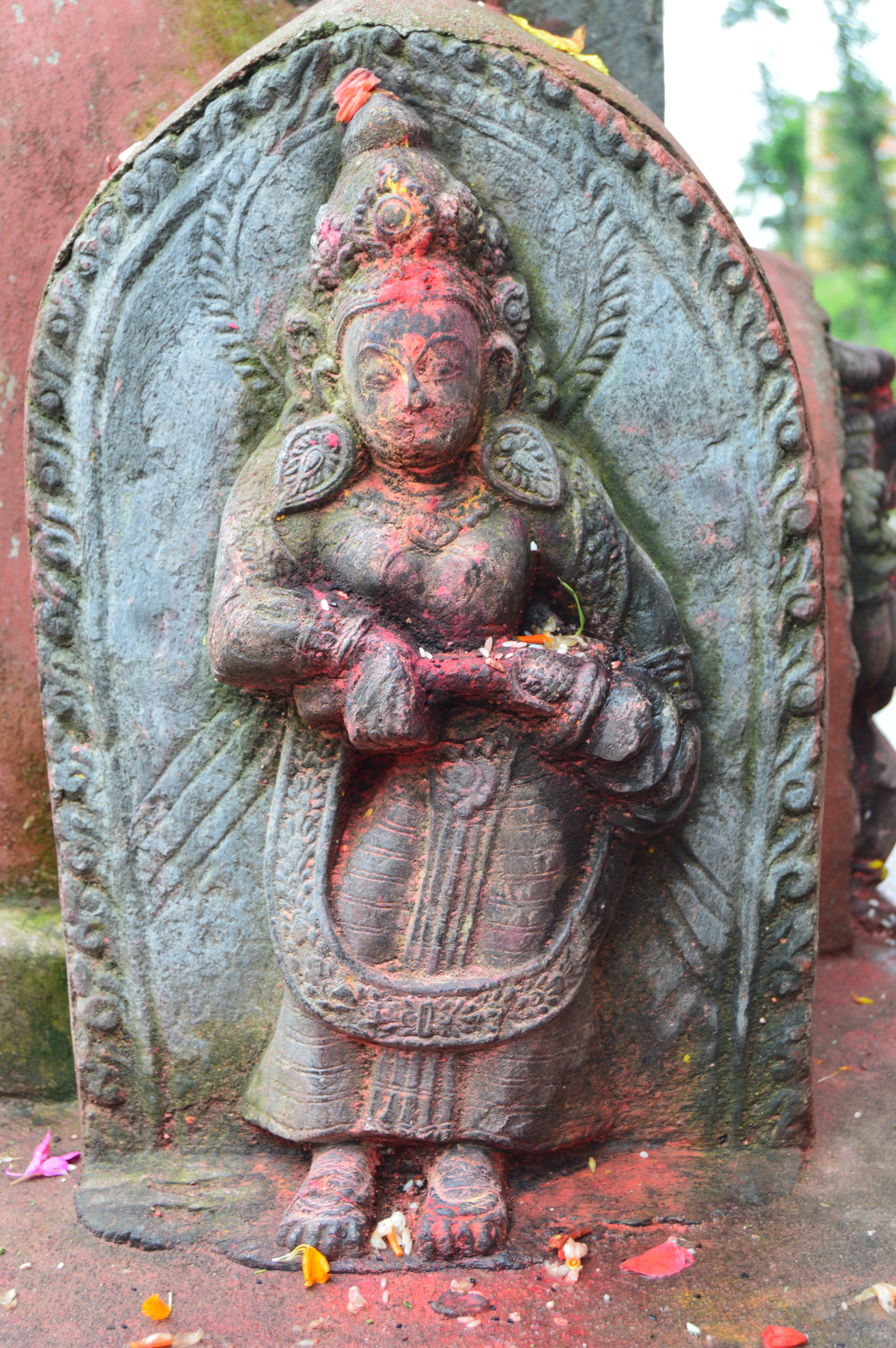
Annapurna with a ladle and pot.

The Agamas (religious texts) describe the iconography of Annapurna as a youthful goddess having red complexion with a face round like the full moon, three eyes, high breasts, and four hands. The lower left hand is depicted as holding a vessel full of delicious porridge. The right hand with a golden ladle adorned with various jewels. The other two hands depict the abhaya and varada poses. She is depicted with wristlets and golden jewelry on her chest. She is seated on a throne with the crescent moon adorning her head.

In some depictions, Shiva is shown standing to her right with a begging bowl, begging her for alms.

== Literary sources ==
Annapurna is mentioned in Hindu religious texts such as the Rudrayamala, Sivarahasya, Annapurnamantratsava, Maha Tripurasiddhanta, Annapurna Kavacha, Annapurnahavamti, Annapurnamalininaksatramalika, and Bhairvahyantantra. The Kumara Sambhavam by Kalidasa makes vivid mention about Varanasi and the deity Annapurna. The goddess is also described as the source of knowledge and the main deity in the Annapurna Upanishad, which is considered a minor Upanishad among the 108 Upanishads. In this text, praying to Annapurna is the means by which the sage Ribhu attains knowledge.

The Devi Bhagavata written during the 3rd and 4th centuries CE refers to Annapurna as the goddess of Kanchipuram and Vishalakshi as the goddess of Varanasi. The Skanda Purana, written during the 7th century, states the sage Vyasa was led to Varanasi by a curse, and Annapurna came as a homemaker and offered him food. The Linga Purana mentions that Shiva was begging for food for his children as he could not get food in the world due to a miracle created by his consort Parvati. Parvati came out as Annapurna and offered food to Shiva at his doorsteps. The legend of Kashi Viswanath Temple in Varanasi is associated with the story that Shiva built the temple there in her honour.

The mention of Annapurna is also found in Kumara Sambhava, a Telugu literature, by Nannechola, a Shaiva poet of the 12th century. There is also a mention of the deity in Kasikhanda by Srinatha, a Telugu poet of the 13th century.

She is eulogized in the Annada Mangal, a narrative poem in Bengali by Bharatchandra Ray. The Annapurna Sahasranam is dedicated to the goddess and praises her one thousand names, while the Annapurna Shatanama Stotram is dedicated to her 108 names.

== Legend ==
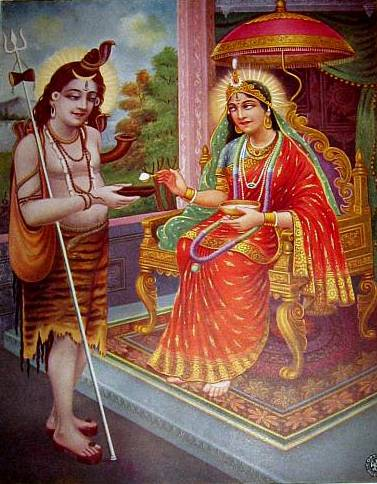
Annapurna serving food to Shiva

One day, the god Shiva and his consort Parvati got into an argument about the material world. Shiva said that everything materialistic was just an illusion, including the food that the humans ate. This infuriated Parvati, who governs materialistic aspects. To show Shiva and the world her importance, she disappeared, saying that she wanted to see how the world would survive without her.

With Parvati's disappearance, the world was deprived of food, and there occurred a famine. Shiva's followers begged him for food; even the Gods were forced to beg for food, but could not find any food. Finally, Shiva and his followers realised that there was only one kitchen on earth, in the city of Varanasi (Kashi), where food was still available.

Shiva went to Kashi to beg for food. To his surprise, the kitchen was owned by his wife Parvati, but in the form of Annapurna. She wore celestial purple and brown garments, which were lightly adorned with ornaments. She was seated on a throne, serving and distributed food to the starving gods and hungry inhabitants of the earth. Annapurna offered her food as alms to Shiva and made him realize that as Brahman, Shiva might have outgrown hunger; but his followers had not.

== Worship ==
Food is considered sacred in Hinduism, and prayers are offered before consuming it. The person who identifies the importance of Annam (food) within the five layers of the body helps carry life in the worldly process and subsequently seeks to identify Brahman, the enlightenment. Annadana, the donation of food, is highly praised in Hinduism. The importance of Annadana is prescribed in the Vishnu Dharamottara, Agni Purana, Padma Purana, Kurma Purana, Nandi Purana, and Vayu Purana.

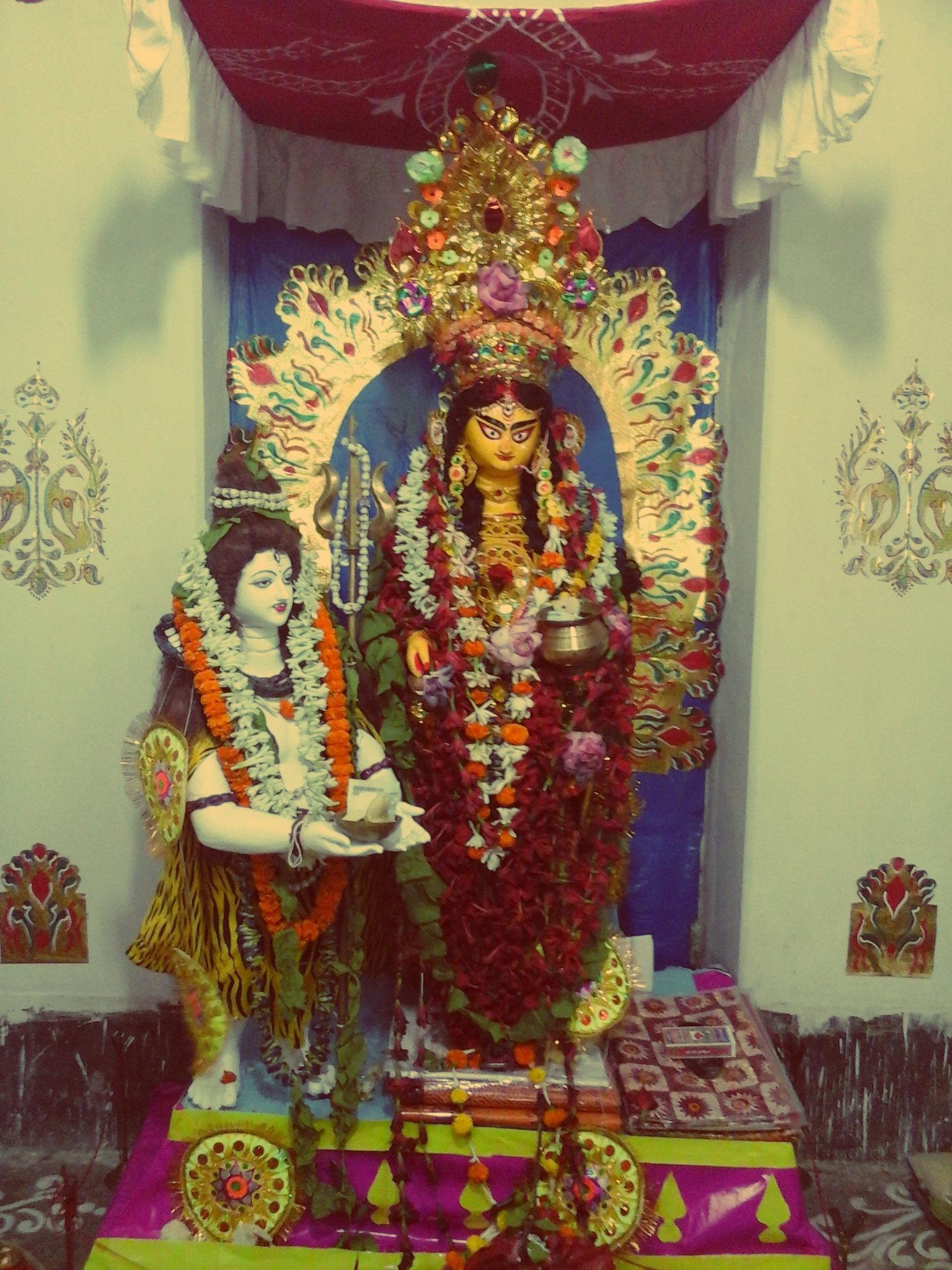
Annapurna with consort Shiva

Annapurna is worshipped through the recitation of her thousand names and her one hundred and eight names. The Annapurna Stotra composed by Adi Shankara extols her attributes and is chanted by devotees.

In Marathi weddings, the bride is given metal idols of Annapurna and Bala Krishna by her mother. She worships them before the wedding, by offering rice and grains to the idols. This viddhi (custom) is known as Gauri Harap. She also takes images of her husband's house and places the idols on them.

Since Akshaya Tritiya is considered to be the birthdate of Annapurna, the day is believed to be auspicious for buying gold jewellery.

== Temples ==
Though Annapurna is a popular deity, there are few temples dedicated to her.

- Annapurna Devi Mandir dedicated to Annapurna is in Varanasi, U.P. Annapurna is the Goddess of the city of Kashi (Varanasi), where she is regarded as the queen of Varanasi alongside her consort Vishweshwar (Shiva), the King of Varanasi. In the temple, at noon every day, prasad (foods offered to the goddess) are distributed to the elderly and disabled. During Navaratri, food is distributed on a larger scale.
- In West Bengal, the ShivaShakti Annapurna temple in Barrackpore was built by Rani Rashmoni's daughter Jagadamba Devi in 1875. This temple was modeled after the famous Dakshineswar Kali Temple.
- In Madhya Pradesh, Annapurna Mandir (Temple) is located near Lal Bagh Palace in Indore.
- Annapoorneshwari Temple, is situated at Horanadu in the Western Ghats, Chikkamagaluru of Karnataka, where afternoon and evening prayers are held after the devotees are fed.
- In Kerala, there is a temple in Chalappally village by the name Kunnam Annapoorneswari Devi Temple.
- A temple of the goddess is in Cherukunnu, Kannur, Kerala by the name Annapurneshwari Temple, Cherukunnu.
- In Puducode town of Kerala, there is Puducode Annapoorneswari Temple, where the grand celebration of Navaratri held yearly with grand feast, which is crowded by thousands of devotees from all around the globe, those who have migrated and settled elsewhere.
- In Thodupuzha town, there is Thachukuzhikavu Annapoorneswari-Bhadrakali-Navagraha Temple.
- In Tamil Nadu, several temples exist dedicated to the goddess, notable among them are: Odhanavaneswarar Temple, Tiruchotruturai, a temple for Annapurna constructed near Watrap, Virudhunagar, on the way to Saduragiri the temple is distinct, being in the form of an eight-sided pyramid. Another prominent temple is situated in Coimbatore district. Additionally, a temple named Andakasieswari is currently under construction at Achangudi near Tiruvadanai Town in Ramanathapuram district.
- A temple is under construction at Pathikonda, Kurnool district, Andhra Pradesh.
- In Hyderabad, her temples are found in Jafferguda.
- Her temples are there in Jalandhar and Bhatinda in Punjab.
- In Maharashtra, her temples are found in Bhandara and Akola. One of the temple is located in Manegaon of Solapur District
- Her temples are also found in Gujarat. In Unjha, Gujarat, she is worshipped as Umiya Mata. Some people in Gujarat and Rajasthan also consider Ashapura Mata as an incarnation of Annapurna Mata. In Rajasthan, her temples are found in Mishroli village in Jhalawar district and Kagdara village in Pali district. There is one temple of Annapurna Mata in Chittor Fort. It was built by Maharana Hamir Singh. There are other temples in the fort near the Annapurna Mata temple, which are dedicated to Baan Mata, Charbhuja, and Lakshmi-Narayan. On the top of the Ramgarh hill, Rajasthan, Kisnai, and Annapurna Devi temples are situated in the natural cave. Another temple is in Irinjalakuda Kunjilikattil Annapoorneswari Temple. This is a family temple of local exhaust community where the rituals are done by Brahmin priests
- In Asan, Kathmandu Nepal, there is also a temple dedicated to goddess Annapurna in her Purna Kalash form.

== See also ==
- Annada Mangal
- Ceres
- Ukemochi; the Japanese Shinto goddess of food.
