= Cooch Behar Rash Mela =

Annual winter carnival in Cooch Behar

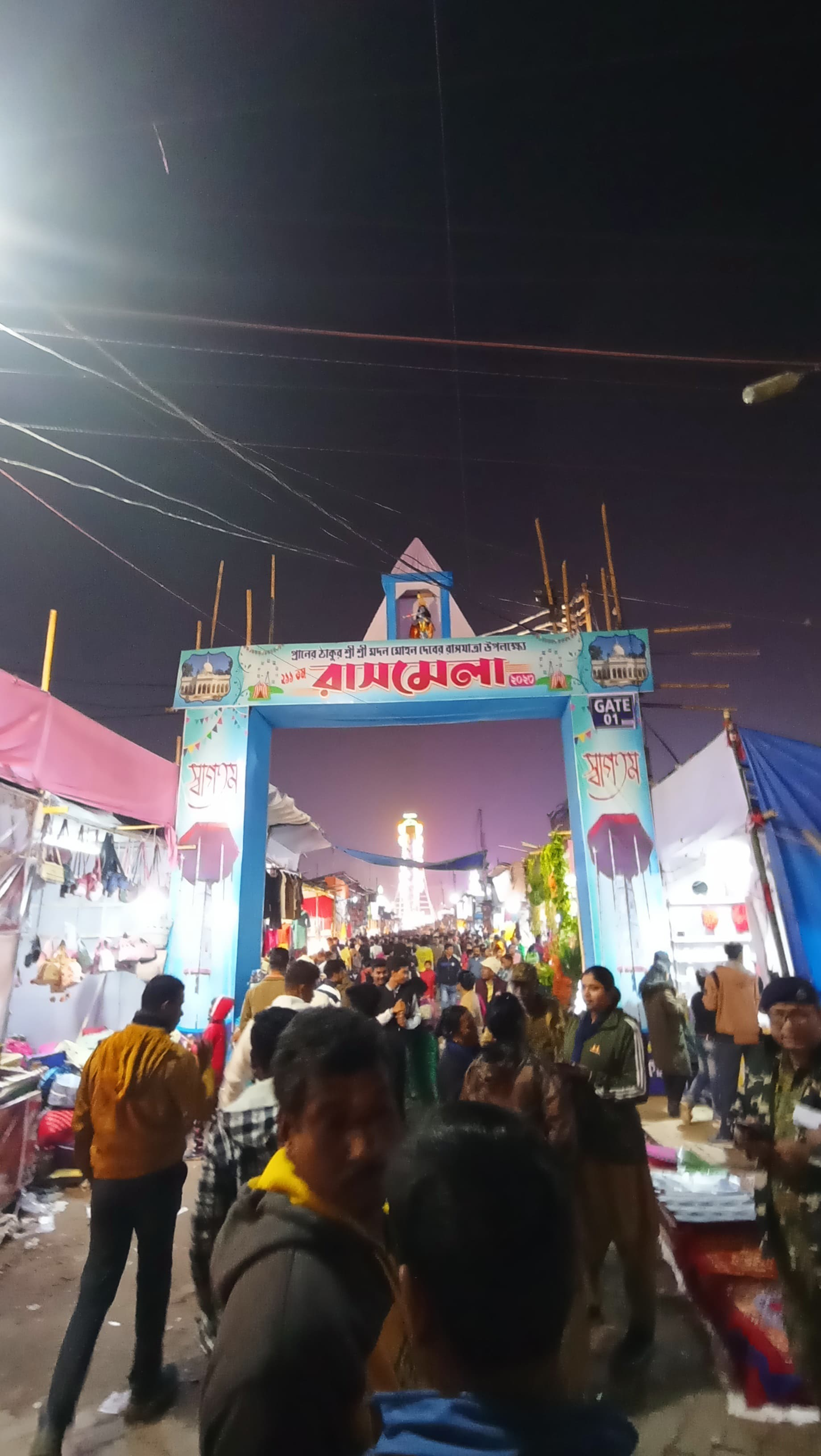
- Gate 1 of Rash Mela 2023
- Status: Active
- Genre: Winter festival, Religious festival
- Frequency: Annually
- Locations: Rash Mela Ground, Cooch Behar, West Bengal, India
- Country: India
- Inaugurated: 1882; 144 years ago (exact date not known)
- Website: coochbehar.gov.in/festivals/

Cooch Behar Rash Mela (commonly known as just Rash Mela or Ras Mela; Bengali: রাস মেলা) is the annual winter carnival in Cooch Behar, West Bengal, India which is organised on the occasion of Rash Purnima every year between the months of November and December every year since the rule of the 17th King of Koch Bihar Maharaja Harendra Narayan. It is being held every year except in 1912 due to the cholera outbreak and in 2020 due to the COVID-19 pandemic. The duration of the carnival varies between 15-20 days every year.

== History ==
The exact date of inauguration of the carnival is not known but is widely accepted that it began during the rule of the 17th King of Koch Bihar, i.e. Maharaja Harendra Narayan, during 1783-1839. The evidence of this was found in the book Rajyopakhyan.

The event was first held in Bhetaguri (formerly known as Vetaguri) after which it was organised in the complex of the Madan Mohan temple. Since 1912, it is being organised in the Rash Mela Ground. The festival was conducted elsewhere within a small scale in 1912 due to the cholera outbreak but it continued to be celebrated annually then after except in 2020. The carnival was also conducted after the theft of the idol of Sri Sri Madan Mohan from the temple in 1994. The event is currently organised by the Cooch Behar Municipality and the Debuttor Trust Board which is the temple trust.

Rash Purnima is also celebrated with great joy in Nabadwip but unlike Nabadwip only Sri Krishna, the deity of the royal Koch kingdom is worshipped as Sri Sri Madan Mohan instead of the dual idol of Radha Krishna. People of all religions and backgrounds are welcomed in the event. The symbolic Rash Chakra is also constructed in the temple complex by a Muslim family from numerous generations which is rotated by people for seeking fortune and good luck. The chakra is made of bamboo and paper with floral designs and pictures of Lord Krishna.

== Activities and events ==
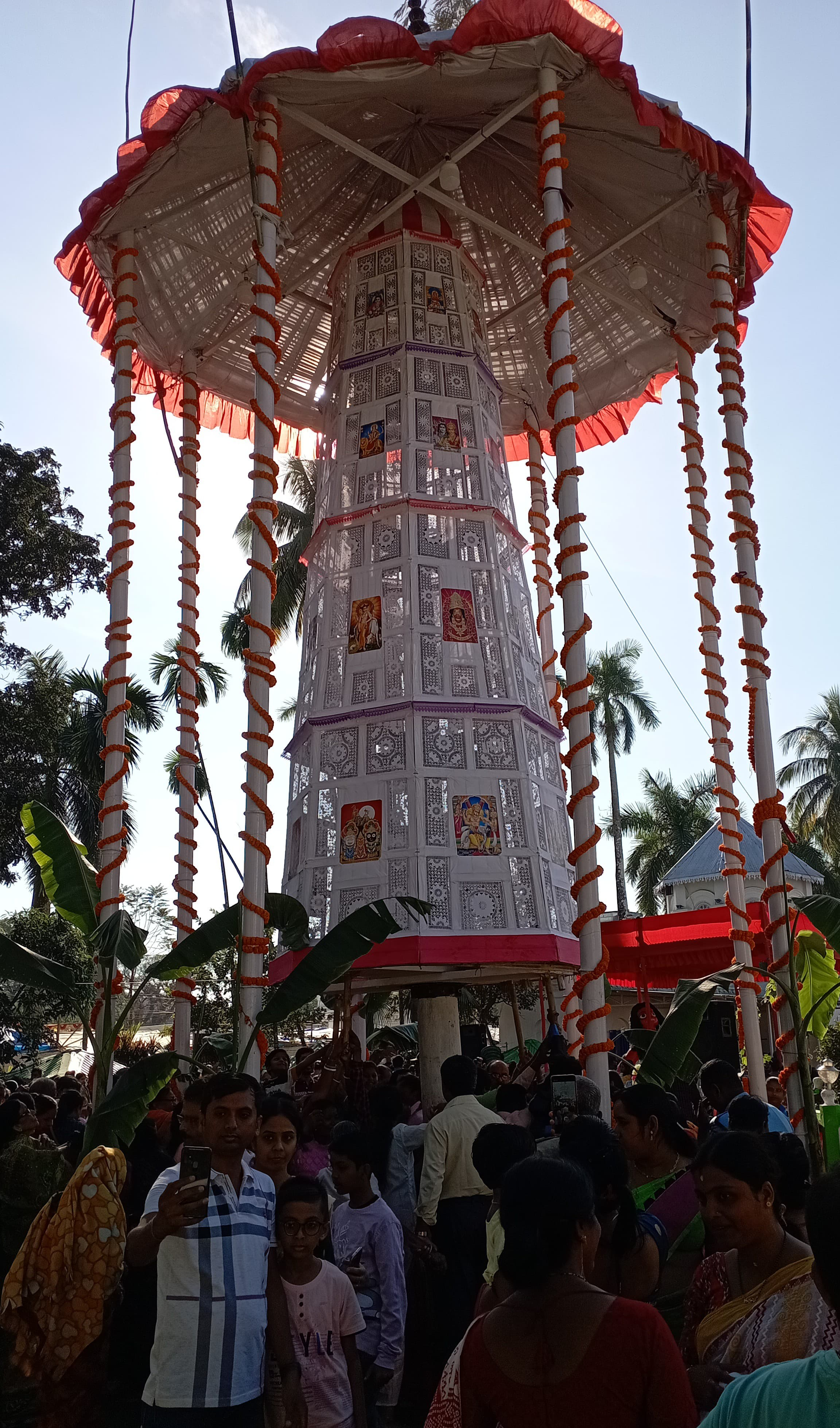
The Rash Chakra in 2023 Rash Mela Celebrations.

The event mainly consists of the programs held in the Madan Mohan temple and the main fair in the Rashmela ground. The event is inaugurated by the district magistrate of Cooch Behar every year.

=== Celebrations at the Madan Mohan temple ===
The main prayer and rituals are conducted in the Madan Mohan temple. The temple hosts the Rash Chakra along with a statue of Putana, a rakshasi (demoness) being killed by infant Krishna which is visited by thousands throughout the course of the event. Numerous kirtans and theatre plays called Jatra are organised during the night.

=== Fair at the Rash Mela ground ===
A fair is organised in the ground which hosts amusement rides like ferris wheel, mini-roller coasters among others. Along with this food stalls, handicraft stores, book stalls, household goods stalls, clothing stores and street game setups are organised. Traders from Bangladesh, Nepal, Bhutan and nearby Indian states also visit the event. Apart from these a concert stage is set up in the middle of the ground which hosts numerous artists from around the region.

== Gallery ==
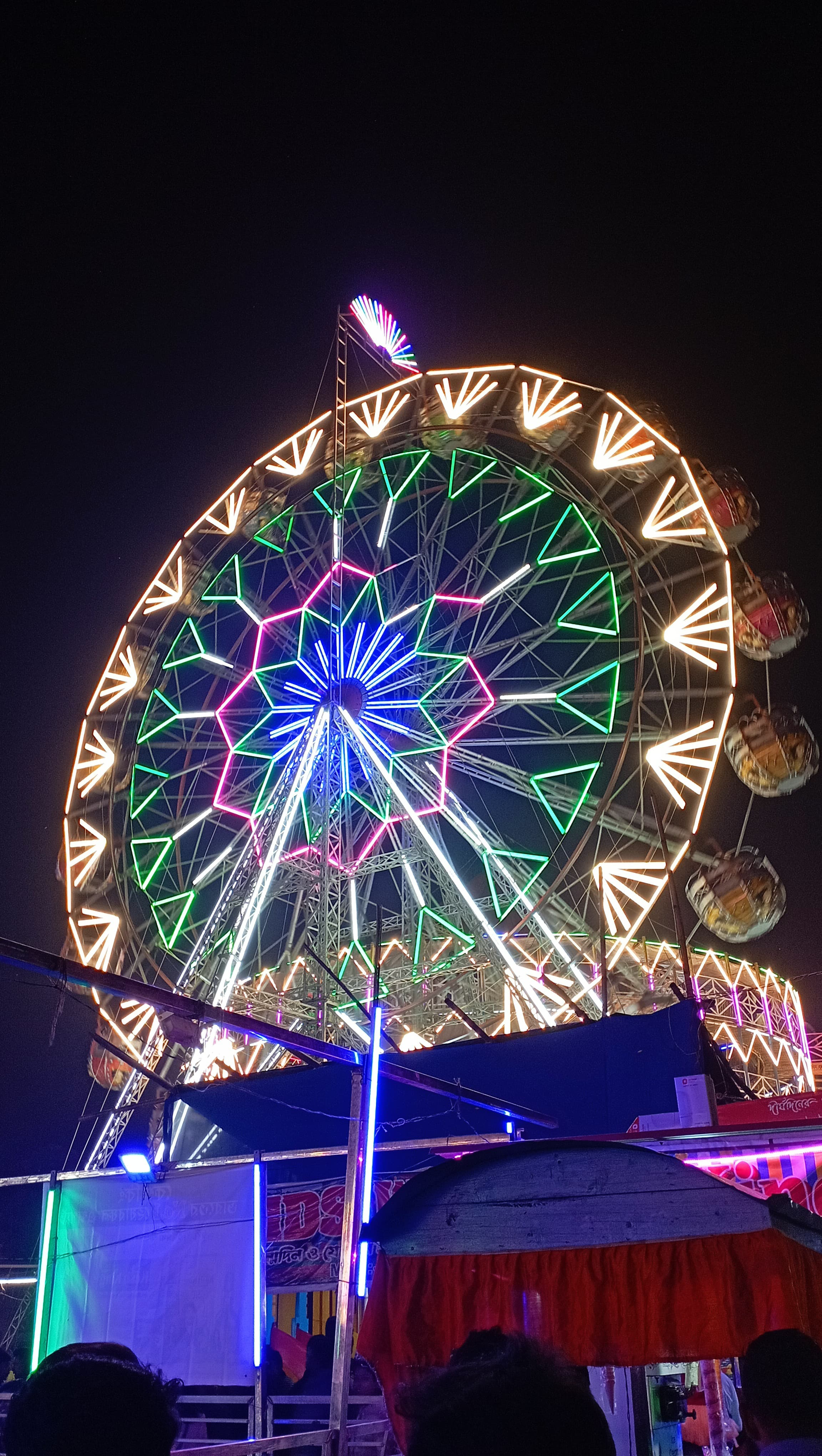
A ferris wheel at Rash Mela 2023

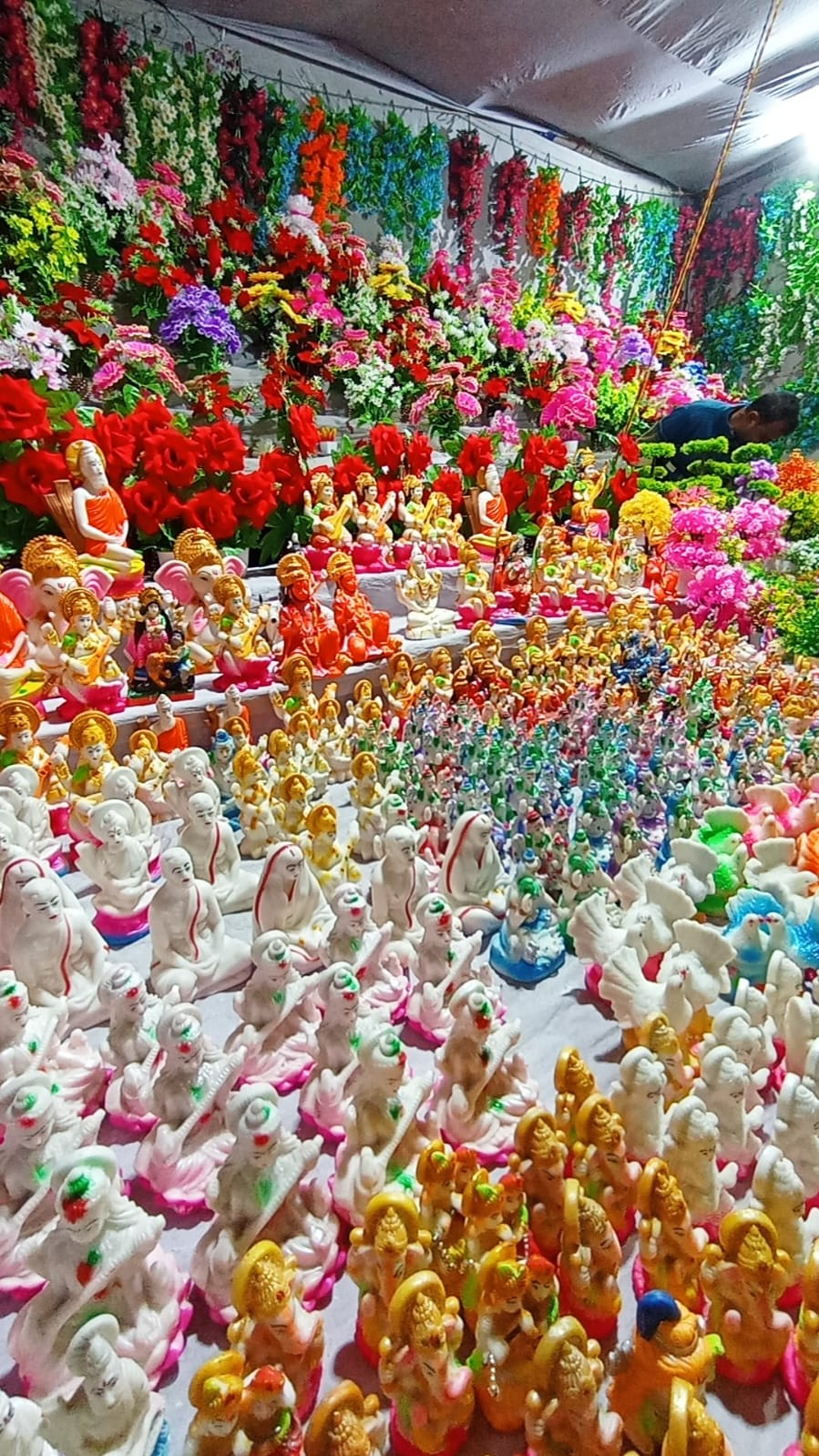
A shop selling idols in 2023

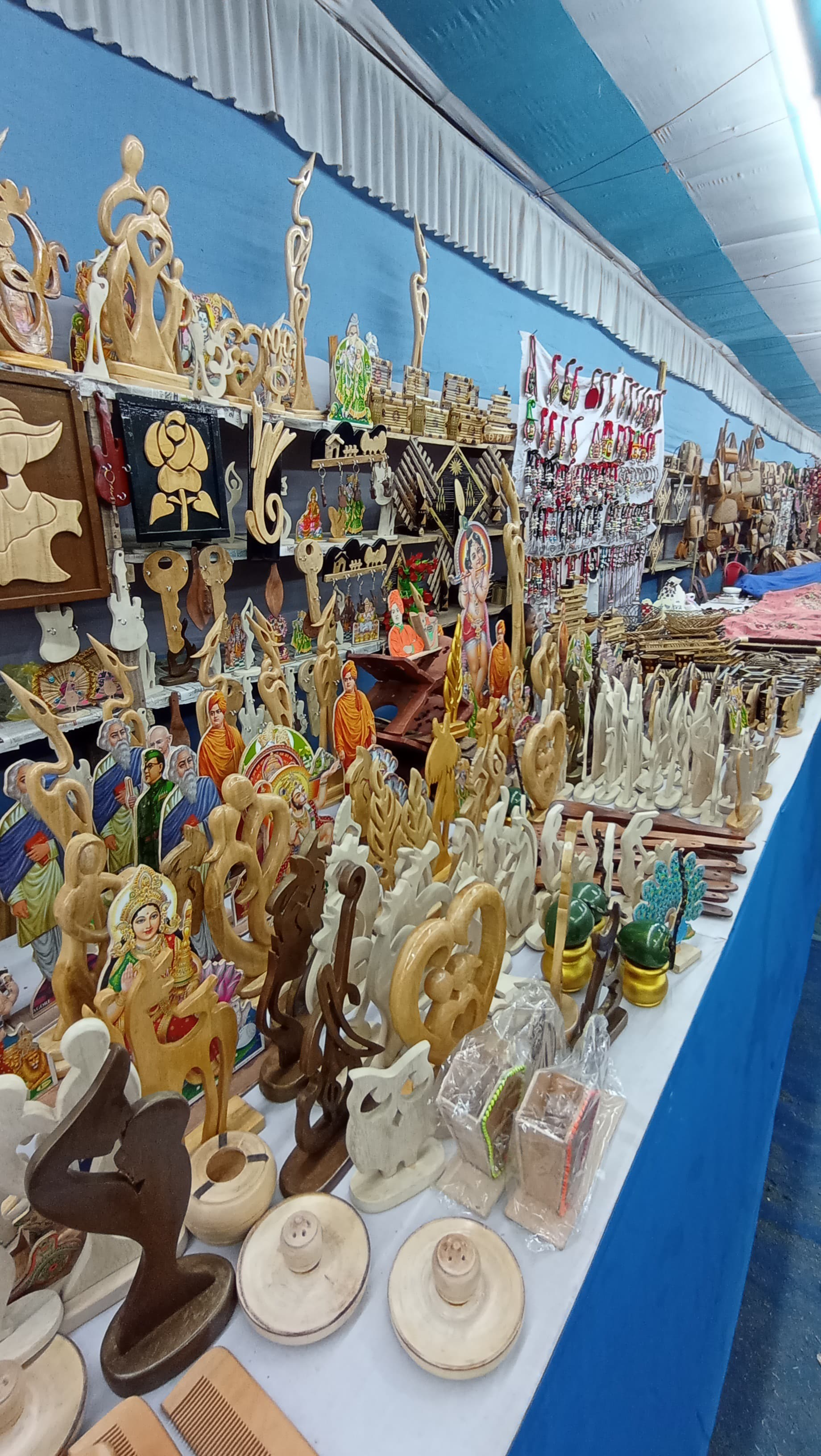
A shop selling handicrafts in 2023

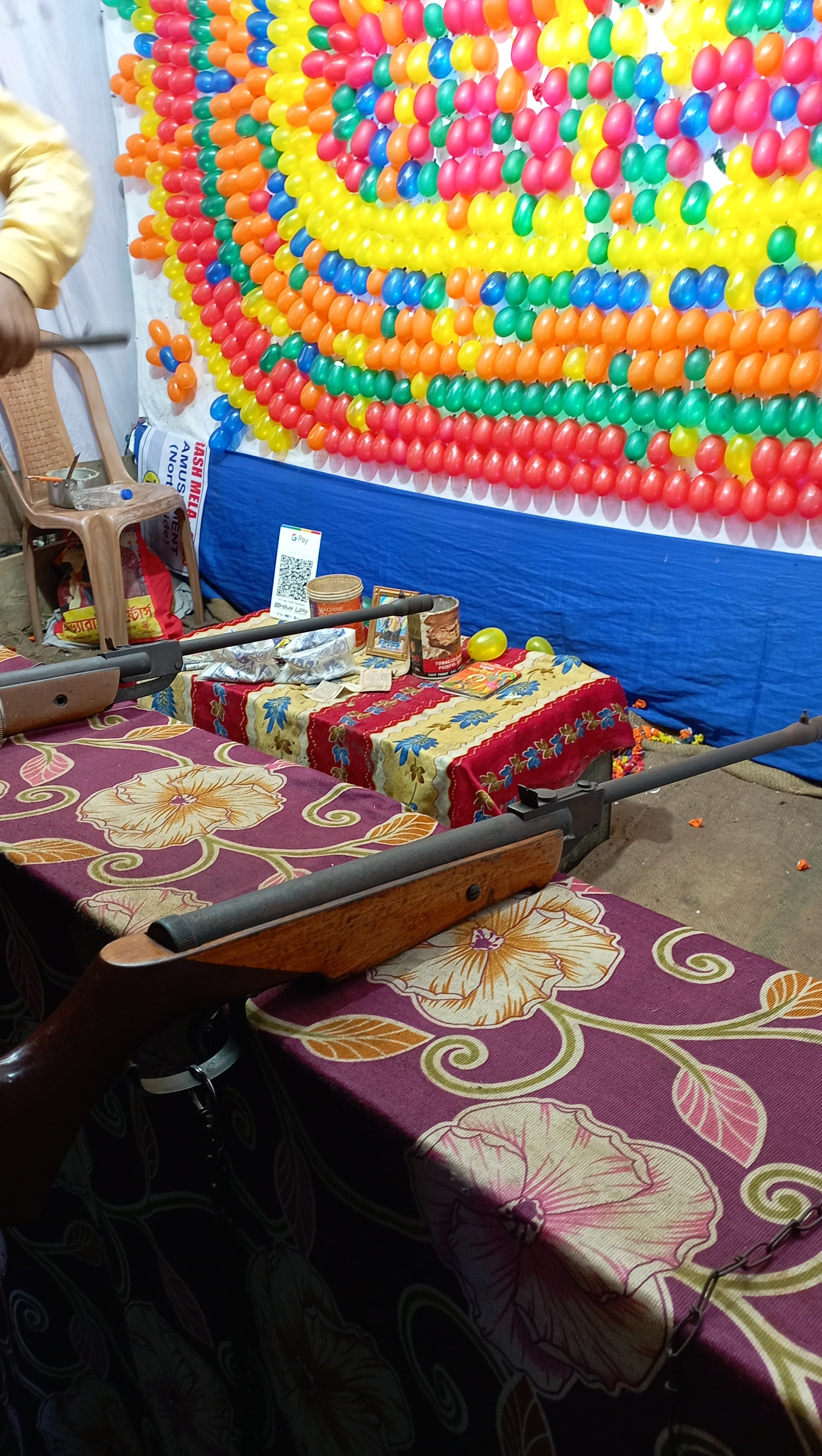
A airsoft rifle balloon shooting game

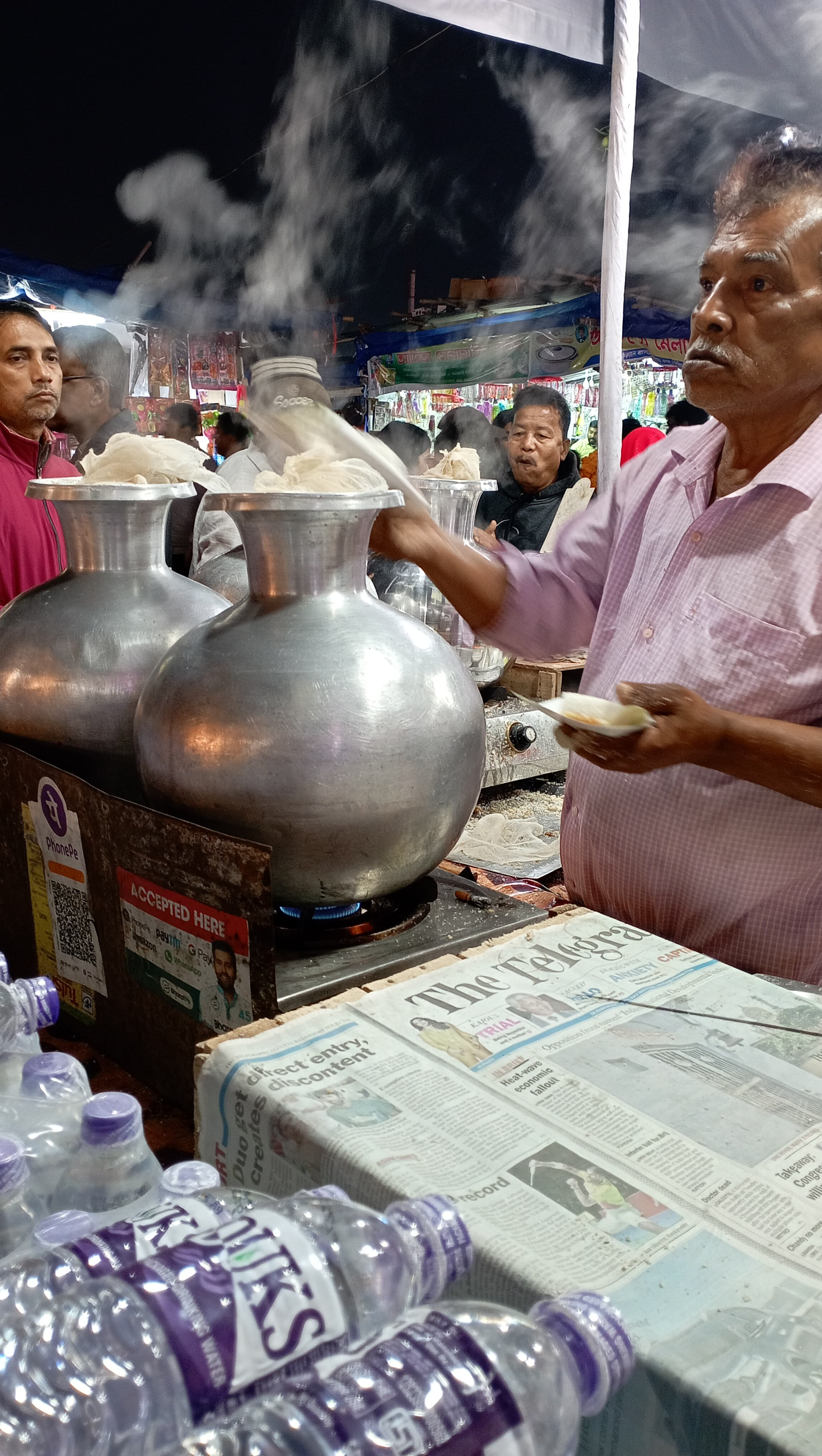
A man making Bhapa Pitha

== See also ==
- Shakta Rash
