= Kaal Bhairav Mandir, Varanasi =

Hindu Temple in Uttar Pradesh, India

Kaal Bhairav Mandir
- काल भैरव मंदिर
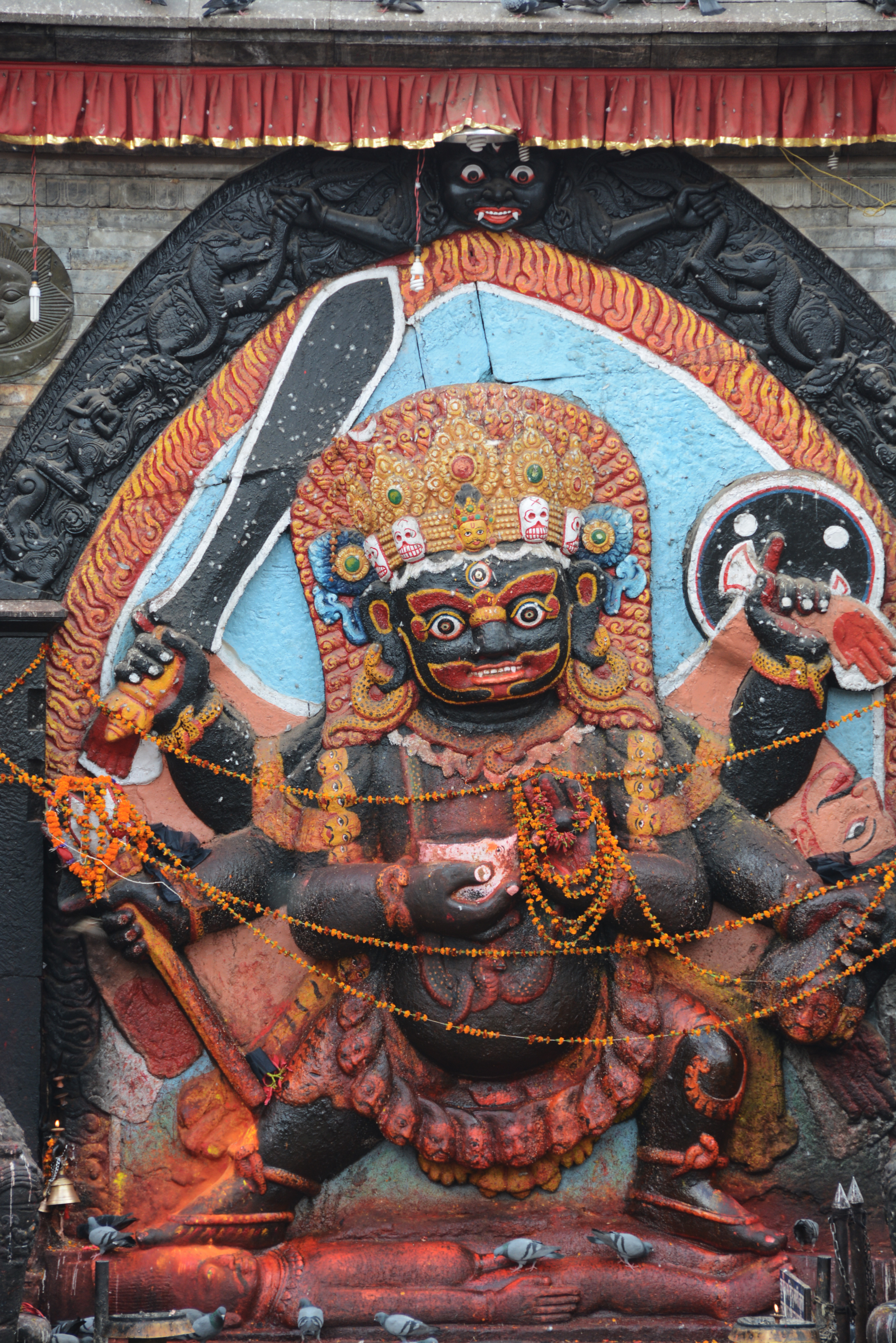

- Temple location on Varanasi district map

Religion
- Affiliation: Hinduism
- District: Varanasi
- Deity: Shiva
- Festivals: Rudraksha; Shringar; Annakut; Bhairav Ashtami

Location
- Location: Visheshwarganj, Varanasi
- State: Uttar Pradesh
- Country: India
- Coordinates: 25.317645°N 82.973914°E

Architecture
- Completed: 17th century
- Elevation: 80.985 m (266 ft)

Kaal Bhairav Mandir (Hindi: काल भैरव मंदिर) is one of the oldest Shiva temples in Varanasi, India. Situated in Bharonath, Vishweshwarganj (Varanasi), this temple has great historical and cultural importance in Hinduism; especially amongst the locals. The temple is dedicated to Bhairava (Kaal Bhairav), a fierce form of Shiva and wears a garland of skulls and carries a club of peacock feathers. The word "Kaal" means both "death" and "time". Kaal Bhairav also means the one who removes the fear of both death and time. It is believed that even death is afraid of Kaal Bhairav.

Housed in the inner sanctum of the temple is a silver faced idol of Kal Bhairav who is seated on his vahana (vehicle), a dog and is holding a trident. Only the face of the icon decorated (with garlands) is visible to the visitors through the doorway. Rest of the icon is covered with a piece of cloth. On the rear door of the temple, there is an icon of Kshetrapal Bhairav, another aspect of Bhairava.

== Religious belief ==
Once, the gods Brahma and Vishnu were competing for supremacy. Then Shiva appeared as a powerful divine light between the duo. An angry Brahma stared at the pillar of light with his 5th head, which started to burn out of anger. Shiva has instantly created the new being Bhairava or Kaal Bhairav (destroying the fear of 'Kaal’ : "Kaal Bhairav"), who decapitated Brahma's 5th head. However, the head stuck to Kaal Bhairav's hand.

Shiva then ordered Kaal Bhairav to go to various places but Brāhmanahatya, the sin of beheading Brahma personified as a gory woman, followed him until he reached Varanasi where Brahma's head fell on the ground. The place is called "Kapal Mochan Teerth". He was freed of the sin of Brāhmanahatya as he entered Varanasi. Shiva then pronounced that "Kaal Bhairav" will forever be in Varanasi in order to remove sins of his disciples.

== History ==
Exact date of construction of Kaal Bhairav temple is not known but it is estimated that the current structure was built in the mid 17th century AD.

== Religious importance ==
Kaal Bhairav is believed to be the Kshetrapala (Guardian of the field or territory) of Creation; everyone who wants to exist in Creation(even if Gods) needs to take his permission to exist. He is also believed to be the Kotwal of "Sati pind" and without his permission, no one can touch the "Sati pind". Kaal Bhairav protects the devotees from all the problems. As per popular belief, Kal Bhairav is considered to be the protector of the city.
