= Chalappally =

- town
- Location in Kerala, India Chalappally (India)
- Coordinates: 9.4166000°N 76.729446°E
- Country: India
- State: Kerala
- District: Pathanamthitta

Languages
  - Official: Malayalam, English
- Time zone: UTC+5:30 (IST)
- Postal code: 689586
- Vehicle registration: KL-62, KL-28
- Nearest city: Mallappally, Ranni

Chalappally is a village in Pathanamthitta, Kerala, India, between the towns of Ranni and Mallappally. Most of its residents work in rubber plantations and agriculture.
