= Bharatchandra Ray =

Bengali poet (1712–1760)

Bharatchandra Ray Gunakor
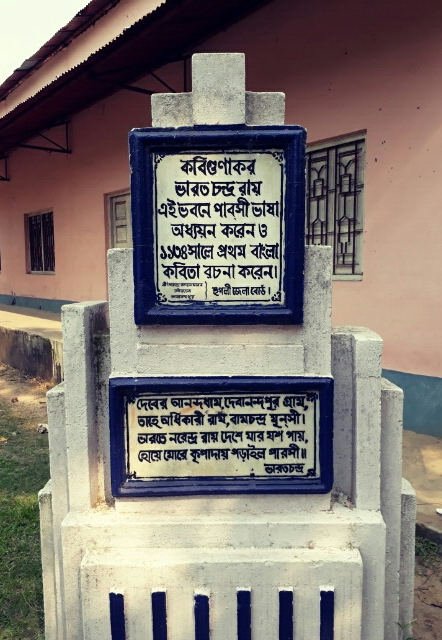
- Bharatchandra memorial, Debanandapur, Hooghly
- Born: 1712; Penro-Bhurshut village,(present-day Howrah district, West Bengal, India)
- Died: 1760 (aged 47–48); Mulajore, (present-day Shyamnagar, North 24 Parganas district, West Bengal, India)
- Occupations: Poet, song composer
- Spouse: Radha Devi

Bharatchandra Ray Gunakor (1712–1760) was an 18th-century Bengali and Sanskrit Sakta court poet and song composer. He is mostly known for his poetic work, Annadamangal or Annapurnamangal. He is often referred to simply as Bharatchandra. Maharaja Krishnachandra of Nadia conferred him with the title Gunakor, after which he became famous as Ray Gunakor Bharatchandra.

== Early years ==
Bharatchandra was born to Narendranarayan Ray and Bhavani Devi in Penro-Bhurshut village (in the present-day Howrah district) which is currently near Amta, Howrah area. He was youngest of the four children. His father entered a property dispute with the Raja of Bardhaman, and in the process disrespected Raja Kirti Chandra Ray's mother Rani Bishnukumari. As a result, they took away all his lands. A penniless Narendranarayan fled away, while Bharatchandra was taken to his maternal uncle's home in Naoapara. While staying there he learned Sanskrit at the nearby village of Tajpur. When he was 14 he mastered the language and married the daughter of Narottam Acharya of nearby Sarada village.

On returning home his elder brothers mocked him for learning Sanskrit as they thought the language would be of no use for them. Bharatchandra felt bad and left home for West Debanandpur, a village in Bandel area of Hooghly district. There, while living in Ramchandra Munshi's house, he mastered Persian. After his education, he worked as a Mokhtar to facilitate his paternal household's property management. He had to leave his ancestral home because of property disputes and marriage of his own choice. He roamed from place to place. He passed some time in Cuttack, Orissa in the domain of the Maratha power. Later he went back to Bengal.

== Court poet of Maharaja Krishnachandra ==
When Bharatchandra was residing in the house of Indranarayan Chaudhury, the Diwan of the French government at Chandernagore, his talent was noticed by Maharaja Krishnachandra of Krishnanagar and Bharatchandra became his court poet. He was bestowed with the title Raygunakar and received huge amount of land in Mulajore from Krishnachandra. He was the first poet in the Bengali language to be identified as a people's poet, and lent a new grace and beauty to the language.

== Works ==
The most notable work of Bharatchandra is Annadamangal or Annapurnamangal. This work, completed in 1752, is divided into three parts. The first part, which eulogises the goddess Annapurna is known as Annadamangal. The second part, which narrates the story of Vidya and Sundar is known as Kalikamangal and the third and the final part, which narrates the story of Man Singh I and Bhavananda Majumdar is known as Annapurnamangal. His another work, Rasamanjari is a Bengali-language adaptation of a Maithili work of the same name written by Bhanudatta. Nagashtaka, a bi-lingual poetic work in Sanskrit and Bengali, shows his mastery over Sanskrit metres. His other notable works include: Gangashtaka in Sanskrit, Satyanarayan Panchali and an incomplete work, Chandi Natak.

== Translations ==
Gerasim Lebedev translated a portion of Bharatchandra's Annadamangal into Russian. He also borrowed from the lyrics composed by Bharatchandra for the musical composition of the two translated plays he stage in Kolkata.
