= Annapurna Devi Mandir =

Hindu Temple in Uttar Pradesh, India

- अन्नपूर्णा देवी मंदिर
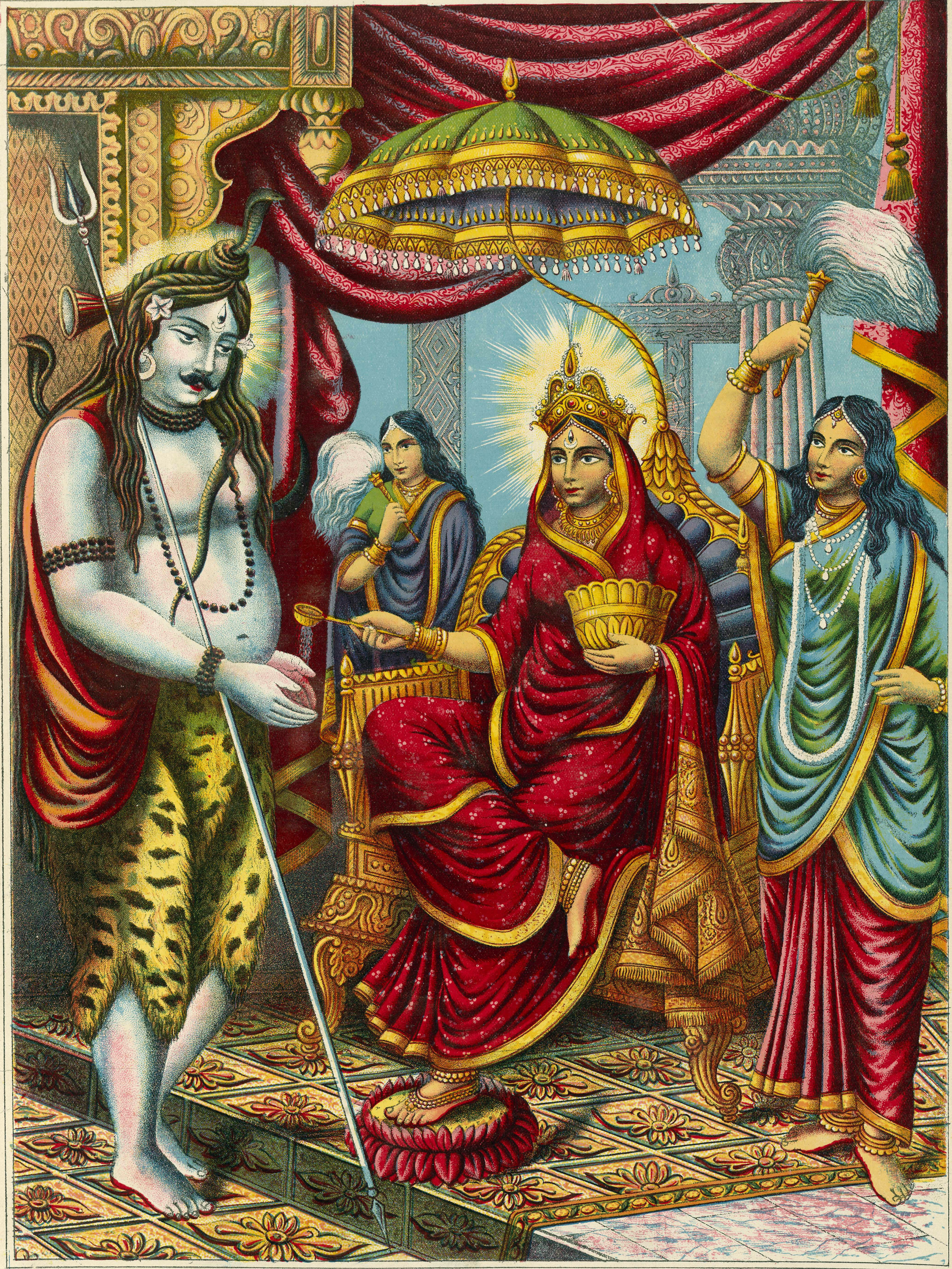
- Pictorial depiction of Goddess Annapurna Devi offering food to Shiva

- Temple location on Varanasi district map

Religion
- Affiliation: Hinduism
- District: Varanasi
- Deity: Annapurna Devi
- Festivals: Navaratri, Annakut

Location
- Location: Visheshwarganj, Varanasi
- State: Uttar Pradesh
- Country: India
- Coordinates: 25.317645°N 82.973914°E

Architecture
- Type: Nagara architecture
- Creator: Maratha Peshwa Baji Rao
- Completed: 1729

Specifications
- Temple: One
- Monument: Two (main)
- Elevation: 80 m (262 ft)

Annapurna Devi Mandir (Hindi: अन्नपूर्णा देवी मंदिर), also known as Annapurna Mata Mandir and Annapurna Mandir, is one of the most famous Hindu temples (Mandir) in the holy city of Varanasi. This temple has great religious importance in Hinduism and is dedicated to the goddess Annapurna. Annapurna is the Hindu goddess for nourishment and is a form of the goddess Parvati. The current Annapurna Mandir was constructed in the 18th century by Maratha Peshwa Bajirao I.

== History ==
Annapurna Devi Mandir was constructed in 1729 AD by Maratha Peshwa Baji Rao. Currently the Mandir comes under Annapurna Math.

== Construction ==
The temple is constructed in Nagara architecture and has sanctum with large pillared porch, which houses a picture of goddess Annapurna. The temple also houses two idols of the goddess; one made of gold and other of brass. The brass idol is available for daily darshan (viewing & worship). The gold idol can be only seen once a year; on Annakut day. The golden idol of goddess Annapurna is sitting on a lotus, while next to the brass idol load Shiva is standing begging for food.

The temple is believed to be the only temple in the country which is of the form of Shri-Yantra. The outer and inner walls of the temple are adorned with intricate carvings of ancient Hindu tales, flowers and geometric patterns.

== Legend ==
In Hindu mythology, there are two popular beliefs behind the origin of this temple.

According to one belief, once the goddess Parvati closed all three eyes of her husband Shiva. Due to this, the entire world was filled with darkness. Parvati lost her fair complexion (Gauri form). She asked Shiva for his help to reacquire her Gauri form. Shiva asked her to donate anna (food) in Varanasi. Hence, she took the form of Annapurna (the goddess of food) with a golden pot and ladle, and donated food in Varanasi.

According to another belief, once Shiva commented that the entire world (including food) is maya (illusion). Parvati, the goddess of food, got angry and decided to demonstrate the importance of food by making all the food on earth disappear. The world started to suffer due to hunger. Shiva finally came to Parvati and acknowledged the importance of food, begging for food at her door. Parvati became happy, offered food by her own hands to Shiva and then made a kitchen in Varanasi for her devotees.

According to Kashi Khand of Skanda Purana, encircling the shrine eight or 108 times brings blessings.

== Location ==
Annapurna Devi Mandir is situated in Visheshwarganj, Varanasi. It is situated 15 meters North-West of the famous Kashi Vishwanath Mandir, 200 meters west of Vishalakshi Temple, 350 meters West of Manikarnika Ghat, 5 kilometers South-East of Varanasi Junction railway station and 4.5 kilometers North-East of Banaras Hindu University.

=== Annapuran Devi Temple, Indore ===
There is one more Annapurna Mandir, which is in Indore city, state MP. Maa Annapurna is the Goddess of Food and Nourishment.

The entrance of the temple is adorned with four-life size statues of elephants.

=== Annapurna Devi Temple, Kannauj ===
This temple dedicated to Goddess Annapurna is situated in the outskirts of Kannauj. It was built in 16th century by Raja Pritam Singh. Devotees believe that taking mud from this temple and spreading on their lands increases the crop yield. Every year during Ashadi Purnima, a carnival is organized here which is attended by people from all over the country.

== See also ==
- Hindu temples in Varanasi
