= Lalita Gauri Mandir =

Hindu Temple in Uttar Pradesh, India

Lalita Gauri Mandir ललिता गौरी मंदिर
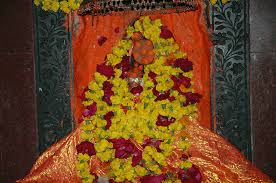

- Temple location on Varanasi district map

Religion
- Affiliation: Hinduism
- District: Varanasi
- Deity: Lalita Gauri (Parvati)
- Festival: Navratri

Location
- Location: Lalita Ghat, Varanasi, India
- State: Uttar Pradesh
- Country: India
- Interactive map of Lalita Gauri Mandir ललिता गौरी मंदिर
- Coordinates: 25.310013°N 83.013276°E

Architecture
- Type: Nagara
- Completed: 19th century
- Elevation: 73.941 m (243 ft)

Lalita Gauri Mandir (Hindi: ललिता गौरी मंदिर), also known as Lalita Mata Mandir, is one of the important and historic temples in the holy city of Varanasi. This temple has great religious importance in Hinduism and is dedicated to the goddess Lalita Gauri (form of Goddess Parvati). The Mandir was constructed in early 19th century. The temple was constructed between 1800–1804 by Rana Bahadur Shah. Lalita Gauri Mandir is situated on the Lalita Ghat and the ghat was named after this temple.

== History ==
King of Nepal, Rana Bahadur Shah took exile in Varanasi from 1800 to 1804 and titled himself as "Swami Nirgunanda". During his exile, he decided to build a ghat to house replica of Pashupatinath Temple in Varanasi. The spot chosen was Lalit Ghat, which was named after the Lalita Gauri mandir. Shah constructed a Nepali Mandir along with the Ghat.

== Significance and religious belief ==
Lalita Gauri is the third form of Goddess Gauri (who is a form of Goddess Parvati). It is believed that a person who worships Lalita Gauri, will attain wealth and prosperity.

== Location ==
Lalita Gauri mandir is situated on the Ck.1/67, Lalita Ghat, 5 kilometers South-East of Varanasi Junction railway station and 300 meters East of Kashi Vishwanath Temple.

== See also ==
- Hindu temples in Varanasi
- Nepali Mandir, Varanasi
- Durga Mandir, Varanasi
