= National Hydrogen Ship =

National Hydrogen Ship is a hydrogen-powered passenger vessel manufactured using indigenous Indian technology. It was inaugurated on December 11, 2025, by the Union Minister for Ports, Shipping, and Waterways, Sarbananda Sonowal, during a ceremony held at the Namo Ghat in Varanasi, Uttar Pradesh. The vessel will operate for passenger transport between Namo Ghat and Lalita Ghat.

== Objectives ==
The primary objectives behind the creation of this ship are to prioritize green energy usage, enhance inter-city connectivity, and provide public convenience while reducing both travel time and costs.

== Significance ==
This marks the first time in the country that a hydrogen-powered ship service has been launched. This project not only showcases India's technological advancement but is also an eco-friendly green energy initiative.

=== Environmental Impact ===
Since it utilizes hydrogen fuel instead of diesel, its only emission is water vapor.

=== National Vision ===
As an extension of the National Green Hydrogen Mission, it aims to make India a global hub for green hydrogen production by 2030 and reduce carbon emissions in maritime transport.

=== Waterway Development ===
It highlights the importance of inland waterways in India's overall growth.

== Construction and Funding ==
The vessel was constructed at the Cochin Shipyard under the Harit Nauka (Green Boat) initiative of the Inland Waterways Authority of India (IWAI). The total Cost of the project was ₹17.5 crore. The Union Ministry of Ports, Shipping, and Waterways provided 75% of the total cost. Operating boats and ships using hydrogen fuel is part of the Central Government's long-term plan to modernize inland waterway transport.

== Key Features of the project ==
- India has become the fifth country in the world—after China, Norway, the Netherlands, and Japan—to operate ships using hydrogen fuel.
- It is a 24-meter long catamaran type vessel.
- It operates on the National Waterway 1 (NW-1) route along the Ganges River.
- A single hydrogen refueling allows the ship to operate for approximately 8 hours.
- The vessel has a seating capacity for 50 passengers.
