= Shri Vishwanath Mandir =

Hindu Temple in Uttar Pradesh, India

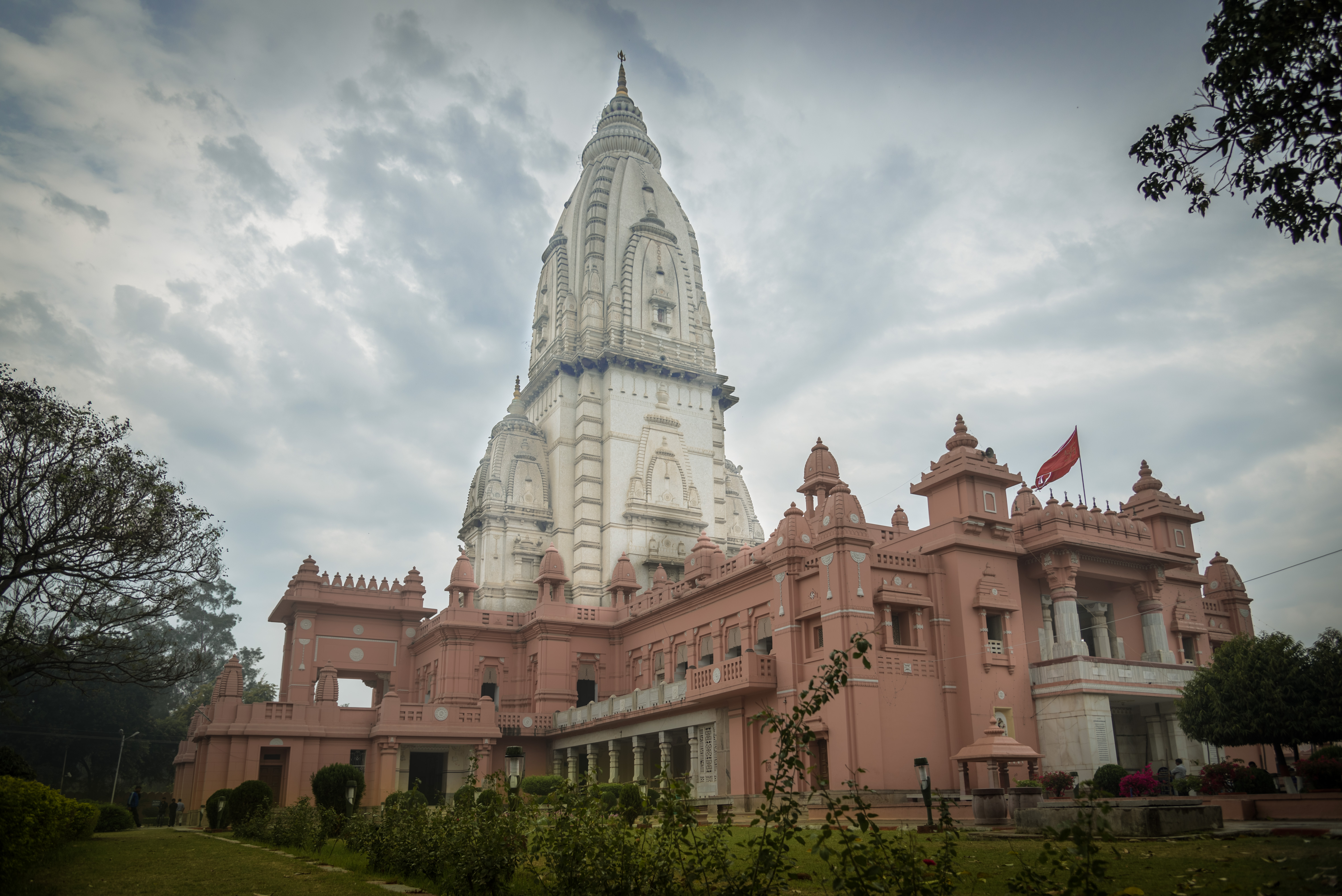

- Location within Varanasi district

Religion
- Affiliation: Hinduism
- District: Varanasi
- Deity: Lord Shiva
- Festivals: Mahashivratri; Nag Panchami; Shravan; Navratri; Makar Sankranti
- Ecclesiastical or organisational status: Administered by BHU

Location
- Location: Benaras Hindu University, Varanasi
- State: Uttar Pradesh
- Country: India
- Coordinates: 25.266034°N 82.987847°E

Architecture
- Creator: Birla family
- Completed: 1966

Specifications
- Temple: Seven
- Elevation: 77 m (253 ft)

Website
- bhu.ac.in/svt

Shri Vishwanath Mandir also known as Vishwanath Mandir, Vishwanath Temple, New Vishwanath Temple and Birla Temple is another prominent Hindu temple in the holy city of Varanasi. Hindus across India and abroad visit this particular Lord Shiva temple to offer prayer to the Lord Vishwanath for the well-being of their families, and eternal peace. Every Hindu must perform a specific ritualistic homage for the departed souls of their ancestors this requires them to undertake pilgrimage to the holy city of Varanasi. The temple is situated near the Banaras Hindu University. Therefore, the temple site and the neighbourhood is a major attraction among Hindu students and visitors touring Varanasi. Shri Vishwanath Mandir has the tallest temple tower in the world with the Shikhara's height being around 250 feet. The temple is colloquially called VT, an acronym of Vishwanath Temple. The temple is under direct administration of the BHU.

== History ==
In the past 900 years Shri Kashi Vishwanath Mandir was destroyed by multiple invaders, however, the locals supported by their Hindu patrons reconstructed this ancient temple as many times. First reported temple destroyer was the founder of the slave dynasty Qutb-ud-din Aibak. He was obsessed by the fellowship of his master Mahmud Ghori the tyrant. On 1194 CE Qutb-ud-din Aibak entrusted his nomadic soldiers to ruthlessly kill locals, maraud their city, enslave young girls and boys, torture the wealthy, kill the Hindu priest, damage ancient scriptures, malign sacred idols, and burn the holy temple to ashes and rubbles. Such an extreme show of power and hatred against the locals of Varanasi was just the beginning of the curse which continued for the next 600 more years. Many more notorious invaders followed footsteps of Qutb-ud-din Aibak. Time failed to heal the scars left by the likes of Hussain Shah Sharqi between 1447 and 1458 CE, and then Aurangzeb in 1669 CE. Hindus still remember how their ancestors survived centuries of tyranny, religious and social persecutions. Even to this day local poetry, religious texts, preserved Hindu paintings, and anecdotal stories remind people how certain intolerant fanatical individual's used incomprehensible, inhumane military tactics against innocent Hindus, their beloved deities and their holy sanctuaries such as the Shri Kashi Vishwanath Mandir. Following the first invasion many eminent Hindus made unconditional efforts to revive the architecture of the destroyed Shri Kashi Vishwanath Mandir to its glory days. All their sacrifices indeed helped preserve the temple history, Hindu faith and the legend of the Lord Vishwanath. Finally, after a period of 700 years, in 1930s, Pandit Madan Mohan Malaviya planned to replicate Shri Kashi Vishwanath Mandir in the campus of Benaras Hindu University. The Birla family undertook the construction and foundation was laid in March 1931. The temple (Shri Vishwanath Mandir) was finally completed in 1966.

== Construction ==
Shri Vishwanath Mandir's construction took thirty-five years to complete (1931-1966). The temple is one of the tallest in India. Total height of the temple is approximately 77 meters. Temple's design was inspired by Shri Kashi Vishwanath Mandir and is made mostly of marble.

Though the Shri Vishwanath Mandir is primarily dedicated to Shiva, consists of nine shrines within one temple and is open to people from all castes, religions and religious beliefs. The Shiva shrine is in the ground floor and the Lakshmi Narayan and Durga shrines are on the first floor. Other shrines within Shri Vishwanath Mandir are Nataraj, Parvati, Ganesha, Panchmukhi Mahadev, Hanuman, Saraswati and Nandi. Entire text of Bhagavad Gita and extracts from sacred Hindu scriptures are inscribed with illustrations on the inner marble walls of the temple.

== Location ==
Shri Vishwanath Mandir is situated 1.7 kilometers inside the campus of Benaras Hindu University (South-West from the main gate). It is 3.3 kilometers South-West of Durga Mandir, 7 kilometers South-West of Shri Kashi Vishwanath Temple and 9 kilometers South of Varanasi Railway Station.

== Gallery ==
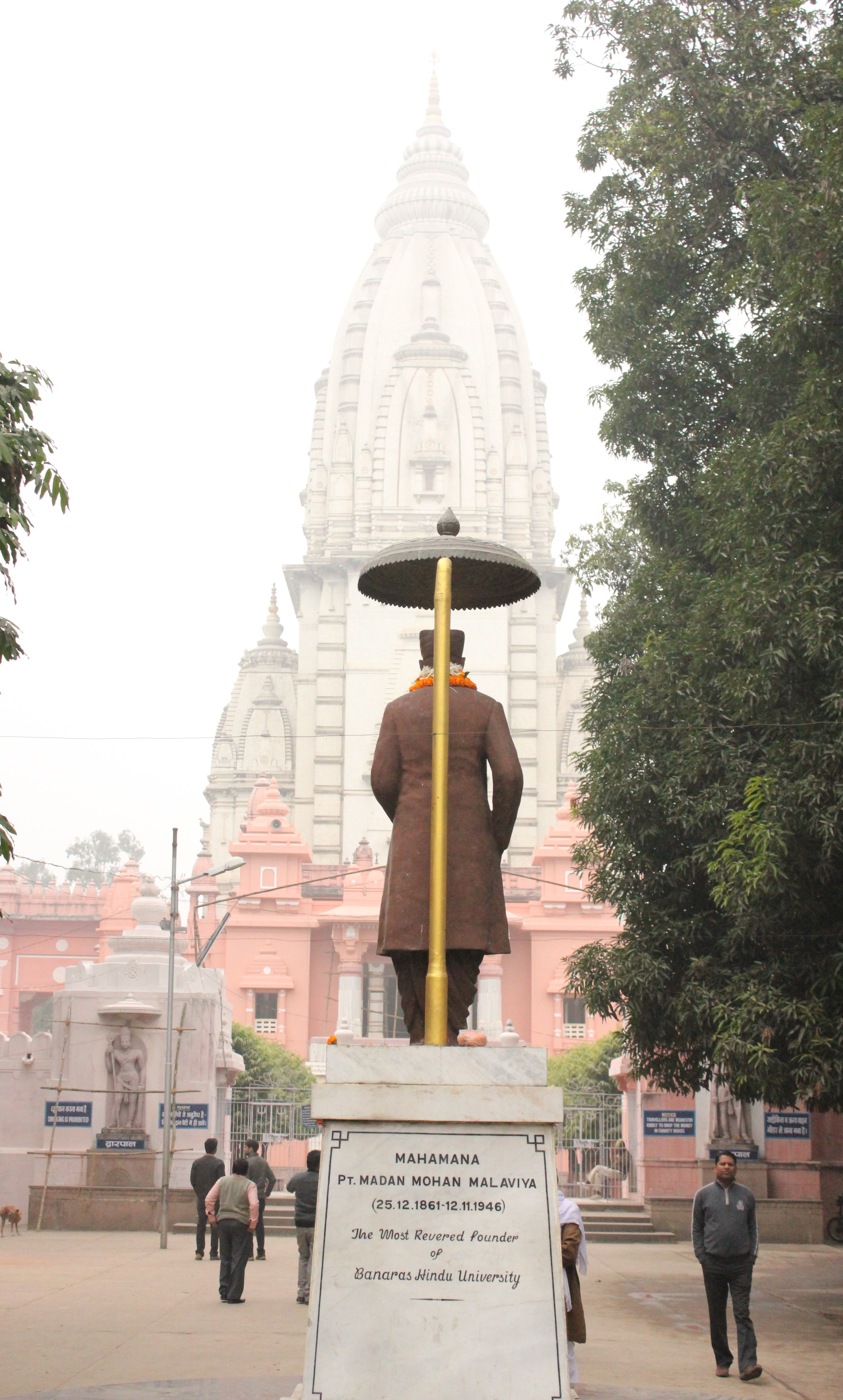
As seen from main entrance (East) of the temple

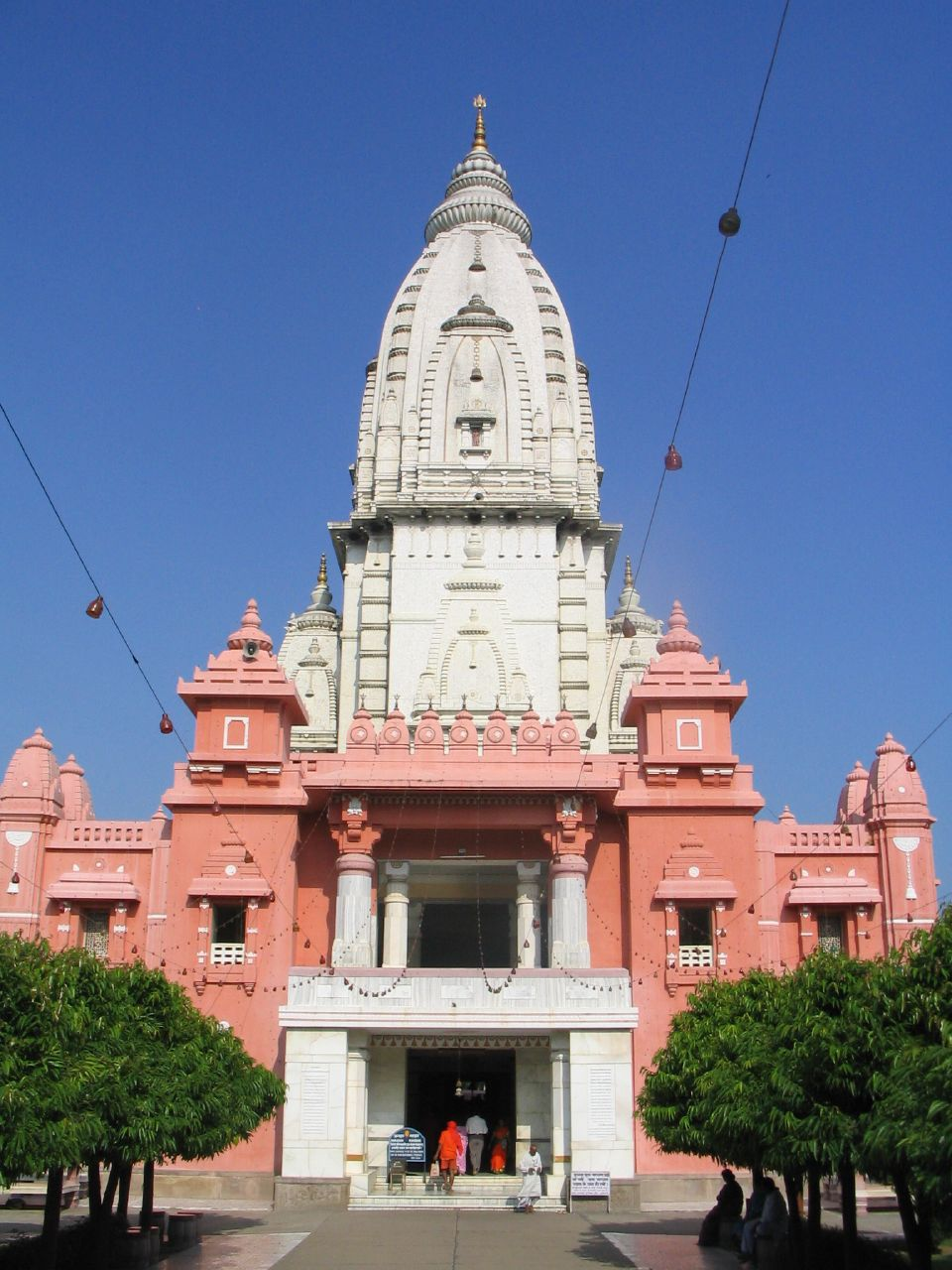
The main entrance (East wall) of the temple

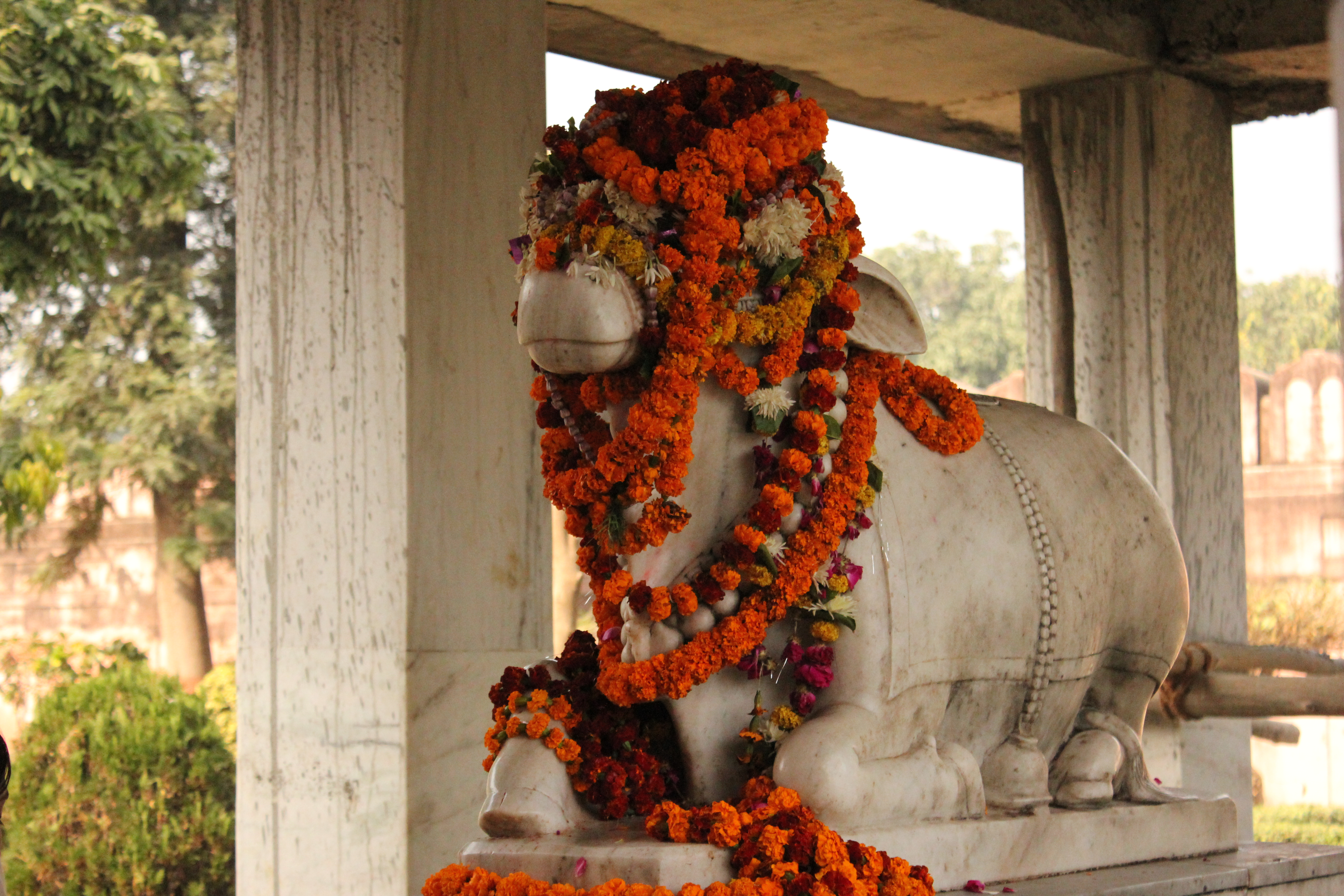
Statue of Nandi in North side of temple

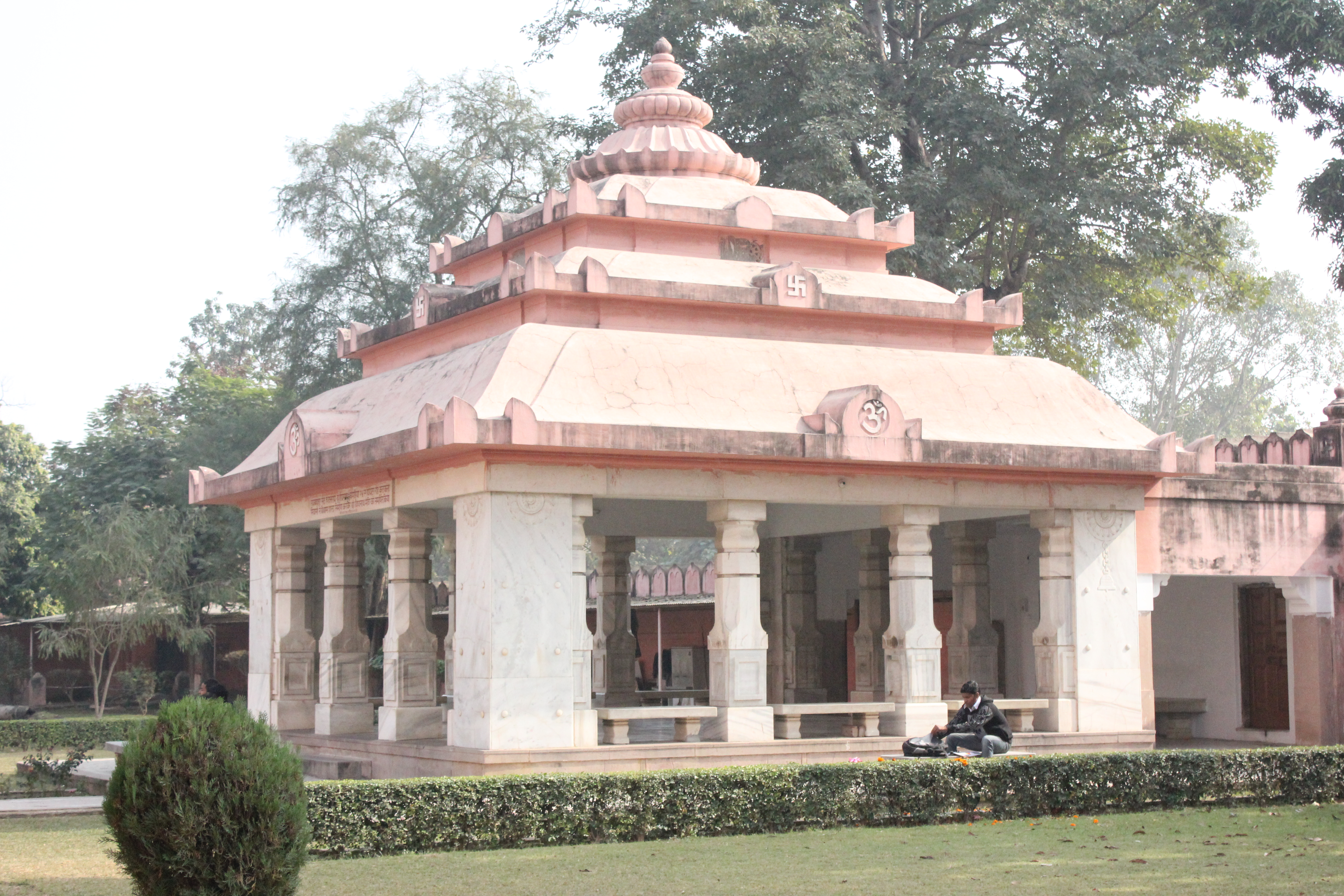
Place in temple compound to do havan

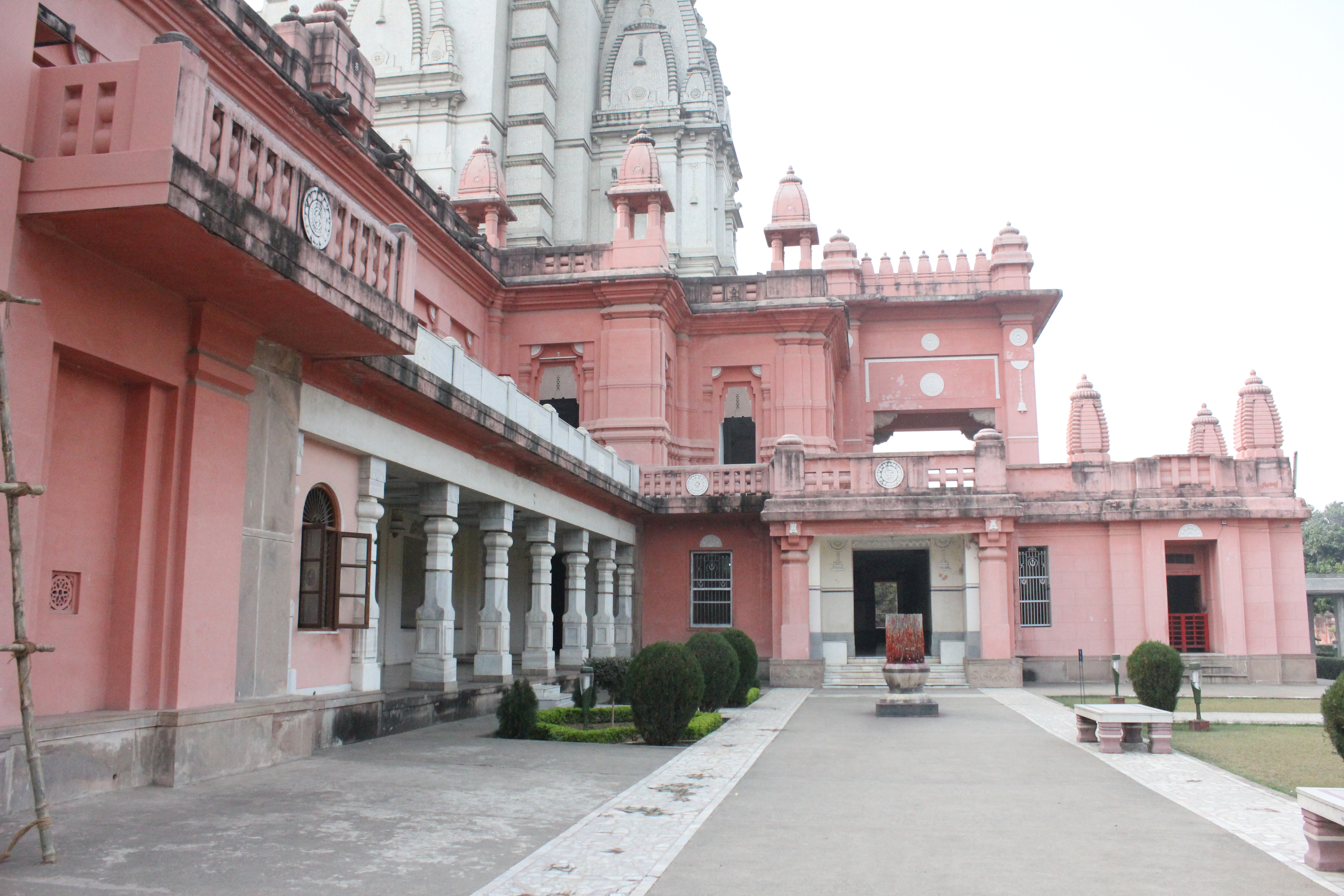
North side of the temple

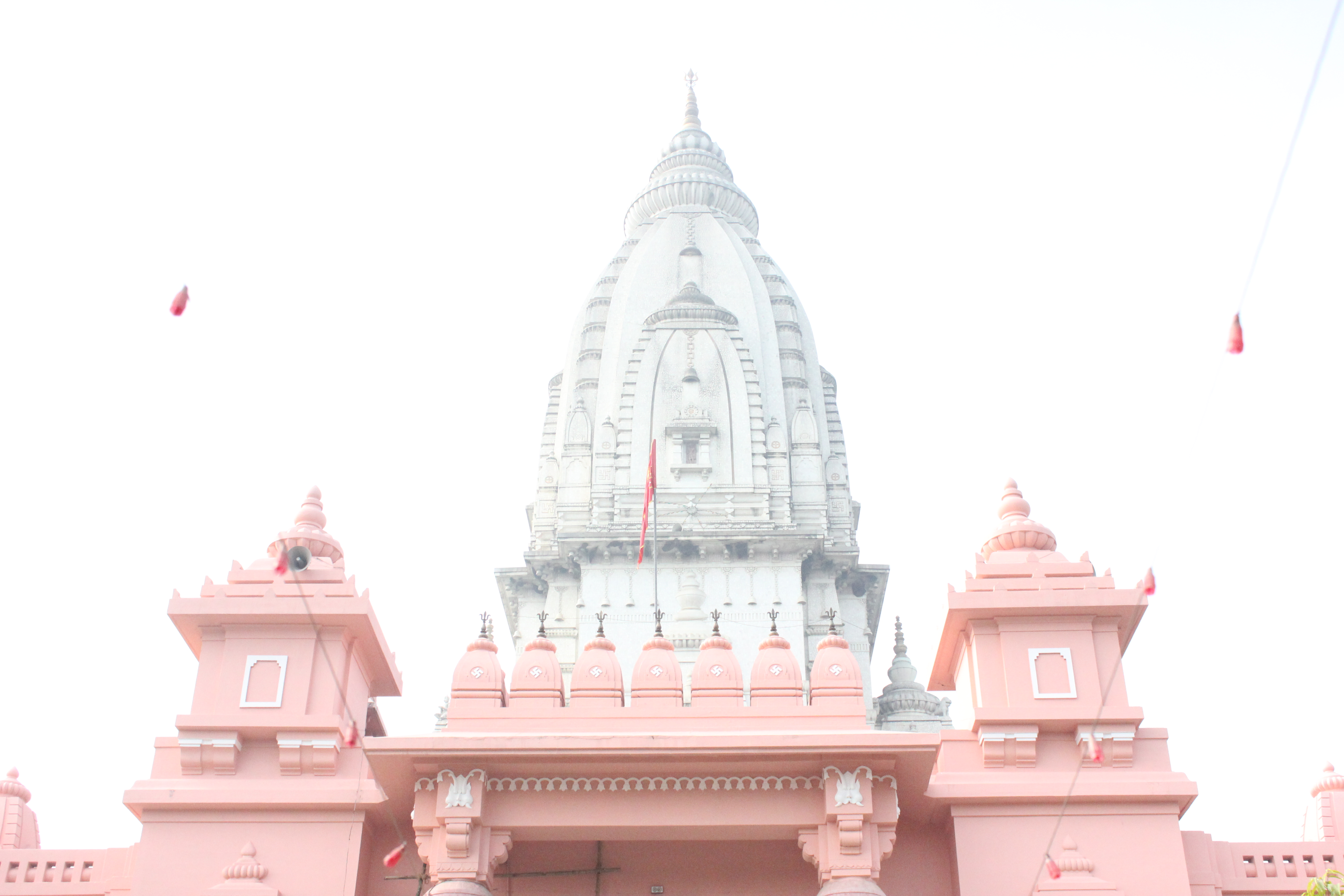
Temple's Shikhara

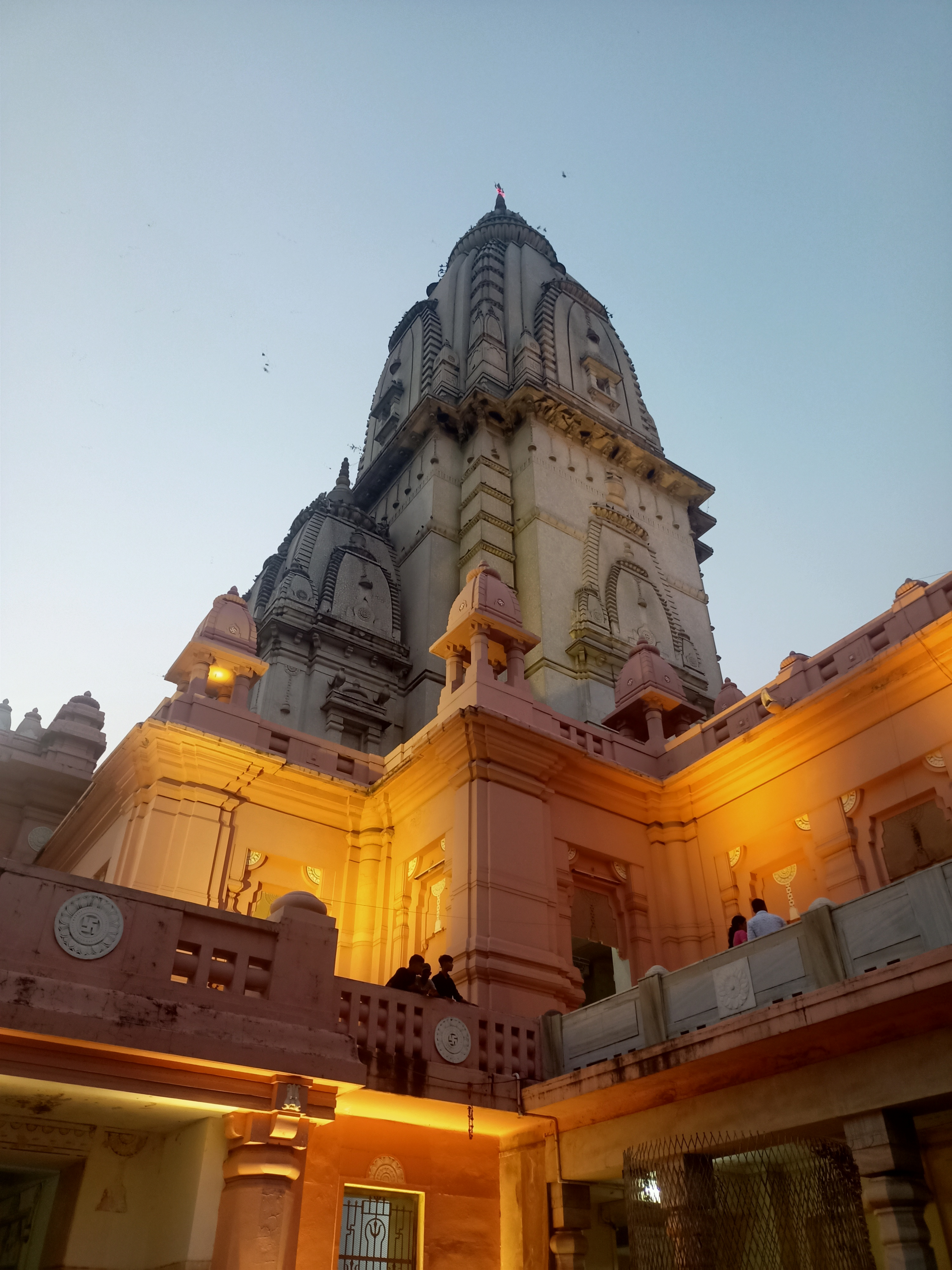
Temple's side view in the evening

== See also ==
- Shri Kashi Vishwanath Mandir
- Banaras Hindu University
- List of Hindu temples in Varanasi
