= Shri Tilbhandeshwar Mahadev Mandir =

Hindu Temple in Uttar Pradesh, India

- श्री तिलभांडेश्वर महादेव मंदिर
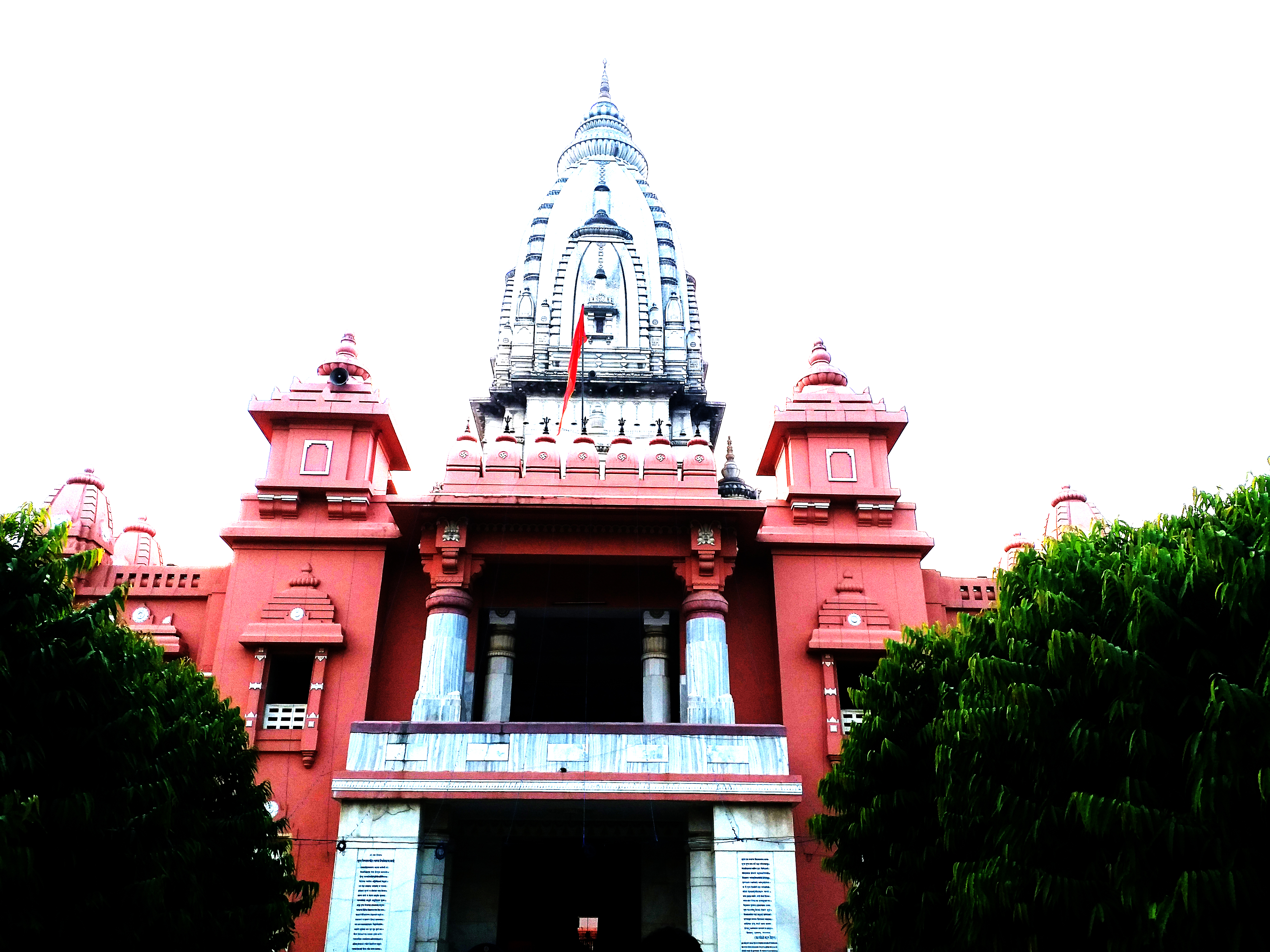
- Shri Tilbhandeshwar Mahadev Mandir is one of the oldest and most famous temples in the holy city of Varanasi. This temple has great religious importance in Hinduism and is dedicated to the Lord Shiva. Tilbhandeshwar Mandir is believed to be constructed in 18th century.

- Temple location on Varanasi district map

Religion
- Affiliation: Hinduism
- District: Varanasi
- Deity: Lord Shiva
- Festivals: Mahashivratri; Nag Panchami; Shravan; Navratri; Makar Sankranti; Ayyappan pooja

Location
- Location: Bengali Tola, Bhelupur, Varanasi
- State: Uttar Pradesh
- Country: India
- Interactive map of Shri Tilbhandeshwar Mahadev Mandir
- Coordinates: 25.302926°N 83.003061°E

Architecture
- Completed: 18th century
- Elevation: 84.660 m (278 ft)

Shri Tilbhandeshwar Mahadev Mandir (Hindi: श्री तिलभांडेश्वर महादेव मंदिर), also known as Tilbhandeshwar Mahadev Mandir and Tilbhandeshwar Mandir, is one of the oldest and most famous temples in the holy city of Varanasi. This temple has great religious importance in Hinduism and is dedicated to the Lord Shiva. Tilbhandeshwar Mandir is believed to be constructed in 18th century.

== History ==
Shri Tilbhandeshwar Mahadev Mandir was constructed in the 18th century. The temple is dedicated to Lord Shiva and is situated in Pandey Haveli, next to Bengali Tola Inter College (Bhelupur, Varanasi). It is believed that the Shiv Ling in the temple emerged by itself 2,500 years ago and increases every year by the size of a "til" (Hindi: तिल; i.e. Sesame Seed). Presently the Shiv Ling is 3.5 feet in height and the diameter of the base is approximately 3 feet. It is also believed that Mata Sharda had spent some days in this temple.

== Location ==
Shri Tilbhandeshwar Mahadev Mandir is situated in Pandey Haveli, Bhelupur, adjacent to Bengali Tola Inter College, 500 meters East of river Ganga, 3.2 kilometers North of Banaras Hindu University and 1.5 kilometers South-West of Shri Kashi Vishwanath Mandir.

== See also ==
- Mrityunjay Mahadev Mandir
- Hindu temples in Varanasi
