= List of Hindu temples in Varanasi =

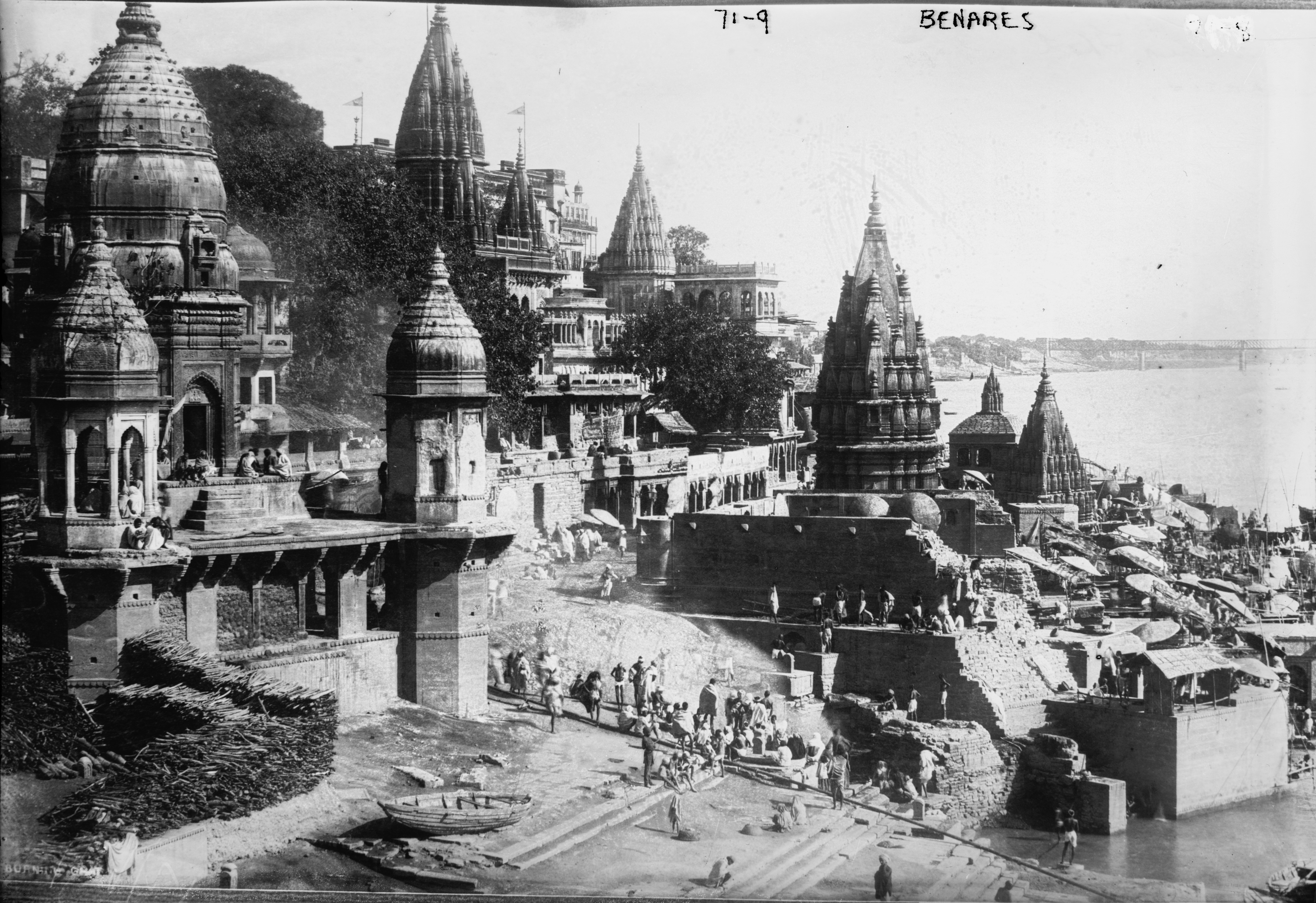
Varanasi temples along the River Ganges in 1922

Varanasi is an ancient city in India famous for housing many Hindu temples. The city's ancient holiness makes it a sacred geography in Hinduism. The city's temples were erected at different times throughout the history of Varanasi by various kings, saints, monasteries, guilds and communities. The city is one of the largest collection of historic and newly built Hindu temples. Varanasi is an ancient city with deep spiritual roots and significance for the Hindus and it reflects this heritage in over a thousand temples.

Varanasi, also known as Benares, Banaras (Banāras), or Kashi (Kāśī), is the holiest of the seven sacred cities (Sapta Puri) in Hinduism and Jainism, and played an important role in the development of Buddhism. It is one of the oldest continuously inhabited cities in the world. Varanasi is also known as the favourite city of the Hindu deity Shiva.

No significant elements of temple buildings predating the Muslim conquest remain, though many temples have been rebuilt on the same sites. Many historic Hindu temples in Varanasi were demolished and mosques built in their place after the 13th-century, particularly in the reign of Aurangzeb in the 17th century. Along with the destruction of Hindu temples in Varanasi, Aurangzeb tried to change the name of the city from Benares to Muhammadabad. Sites such as the Kashi Vishwanath Temple / Gyanvapi Mosque are a disputed site, a source of claims and counterclaims of religious intolerance.

== Shiva ==
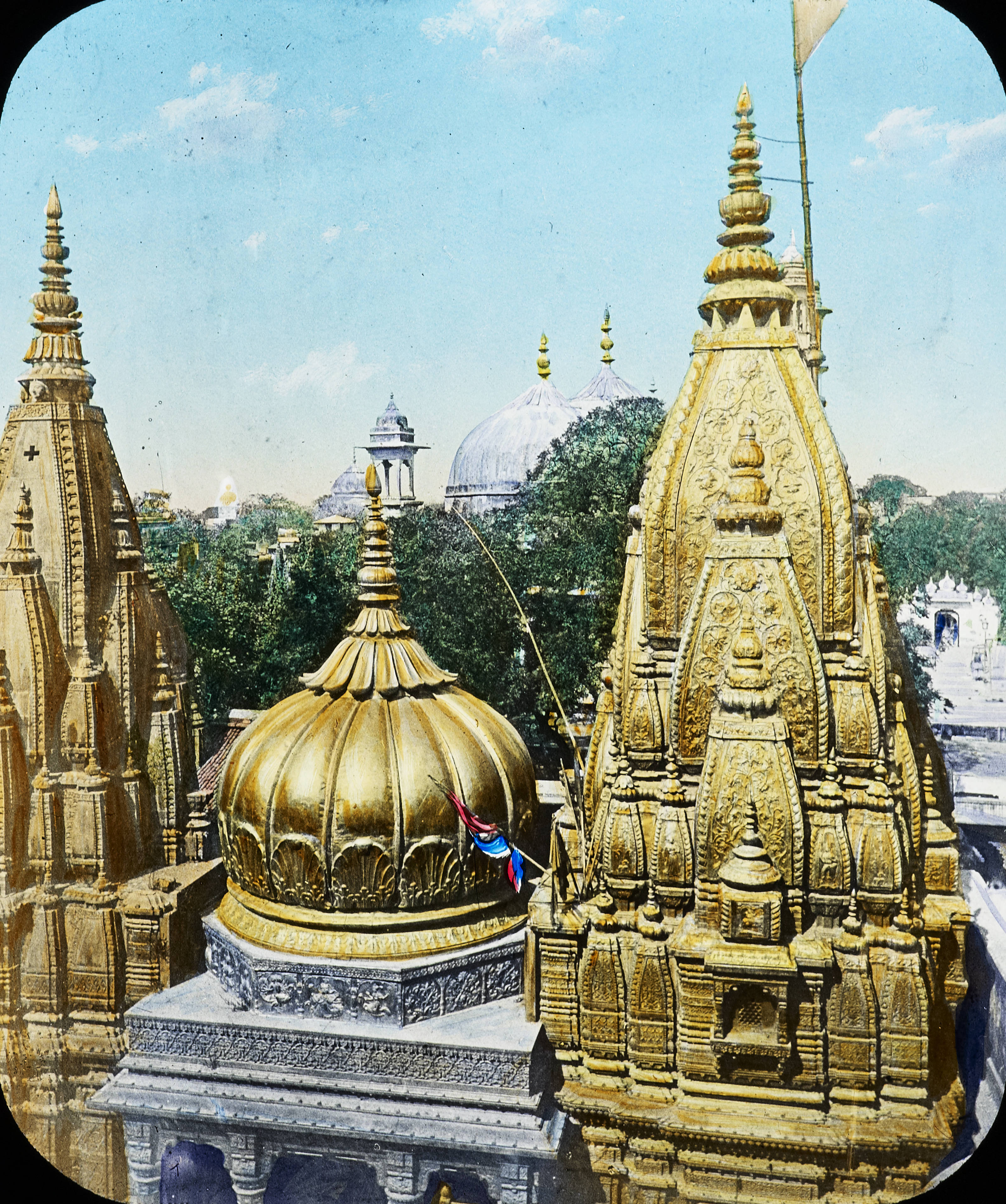
Kashi Vishwanath Temple golden top

- Kashi Vishwanath Temple: Kashi Vishwanath Temple is one of the most famous Hindu temples and is dedicated to Shiva. This is one of the most worshiped Shiva temple in Hinduism and has been mentioned in the Puranas including the Kashi Khanda (section) of Skanda Purana. The original Vishwanath temple was destroyed by the army of Qutb-ud-din Aibak in 1194 CE, when he defeated the Raja of Kannauj as a commander of Mohammad Ghori. The temple has been destroyed and rebuilt several times in the past 800 years and the existing structure was erected in 18th century.
- Kaal Bhairav Mandir: Kaal Bhairav Mandir is an ancient temple of Varanasi near the main Post Office, Vishesharganj. Kaal Bhairav is believed to be the guardian deity of Varanasi.
- Mokshling Shree Gopreksheshwar Mahadev (ardhnarishwar) : The most sacred Ardhanarishwar Mokshaling of Kashi, where the infinite blessings of Shiva-Gauri shower the devotees and one who takes darshan here gets the virtue of donating anant cows. Gopreksheshwar is an extremely ancient and important Shivling located in Kashi (Varanasi), mentioned in various Hindu scriptures such as the Padma Purana, Skanda Purana, Linga Purana, and Narada Purana. This place is known not only for its mythological origins but also holds special significance for the spiritual benefits associated with it. Gopreksheshwar is such a form of Ardhanarishwar in which Shiva himself in the form of Linga and Maa Gauri herself in the form of idol sit together in the same idol. Lord Shankar himself ordered the cows to go to Kashi from Golok, when they reached Kashi by the order of Bholenath, then Lord Shankar became pleased and gave darshan along with Mother Gauri, due to giving darshan to the cows, it got the name Gopreksh, and by having darshan here one gets the benefit of donating infinite cows and marital troubles are destroyed .
- Mrityunjay Mahadev Mandir: Mrityunjay Mahadev Mandir of Shiva is situated on the route from Daranagar to the Kalbhairav temple. Just beside this temple there is a well of much religious importance. Its water is said to be a mixture of several underground streams and good for eliminating several diseases.
- New Vishwanath Mandir (Birla Mandir): The New Vishwanath Mandir, also called Birla Mandir, mainly funded by Birla family, was built as a replica of the old Kashi Vishwanath Temple. Planned by Madan Mohan Malaviya, the temple is part of the Banaras Hindu University campus, and represents national revival. The temple is open to people of all castes and religions. There are nine temples in the Sri Vishwanath Temple campus, including Vishwanath (Lingam), Nataraja, Parvati, Ganesha, Saraswati, Panchamukhi Mahadev, Hanuman, and Nandi. There are idols of Shiva and Lakshmi Narayana.
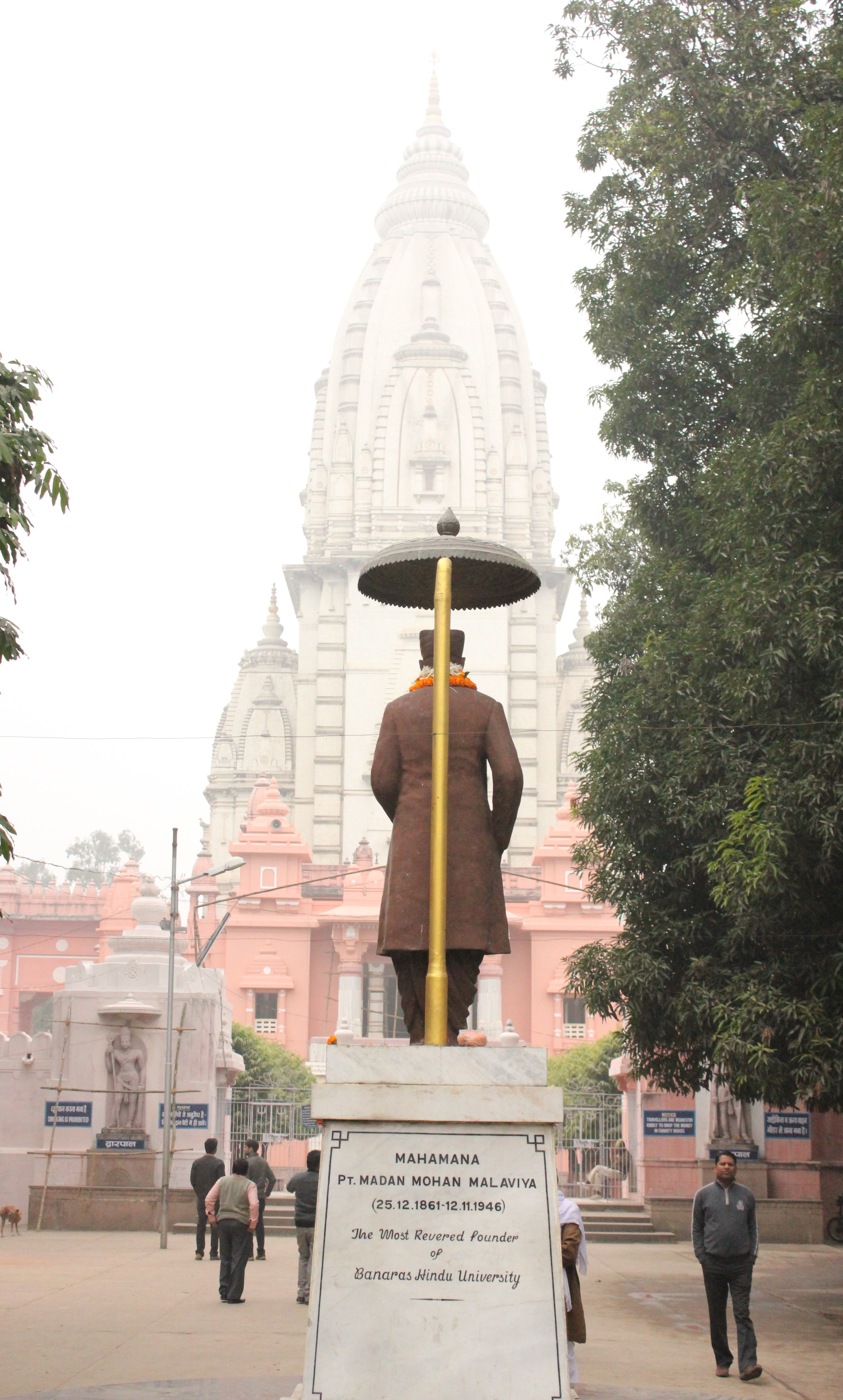
New Vishwanath Temple

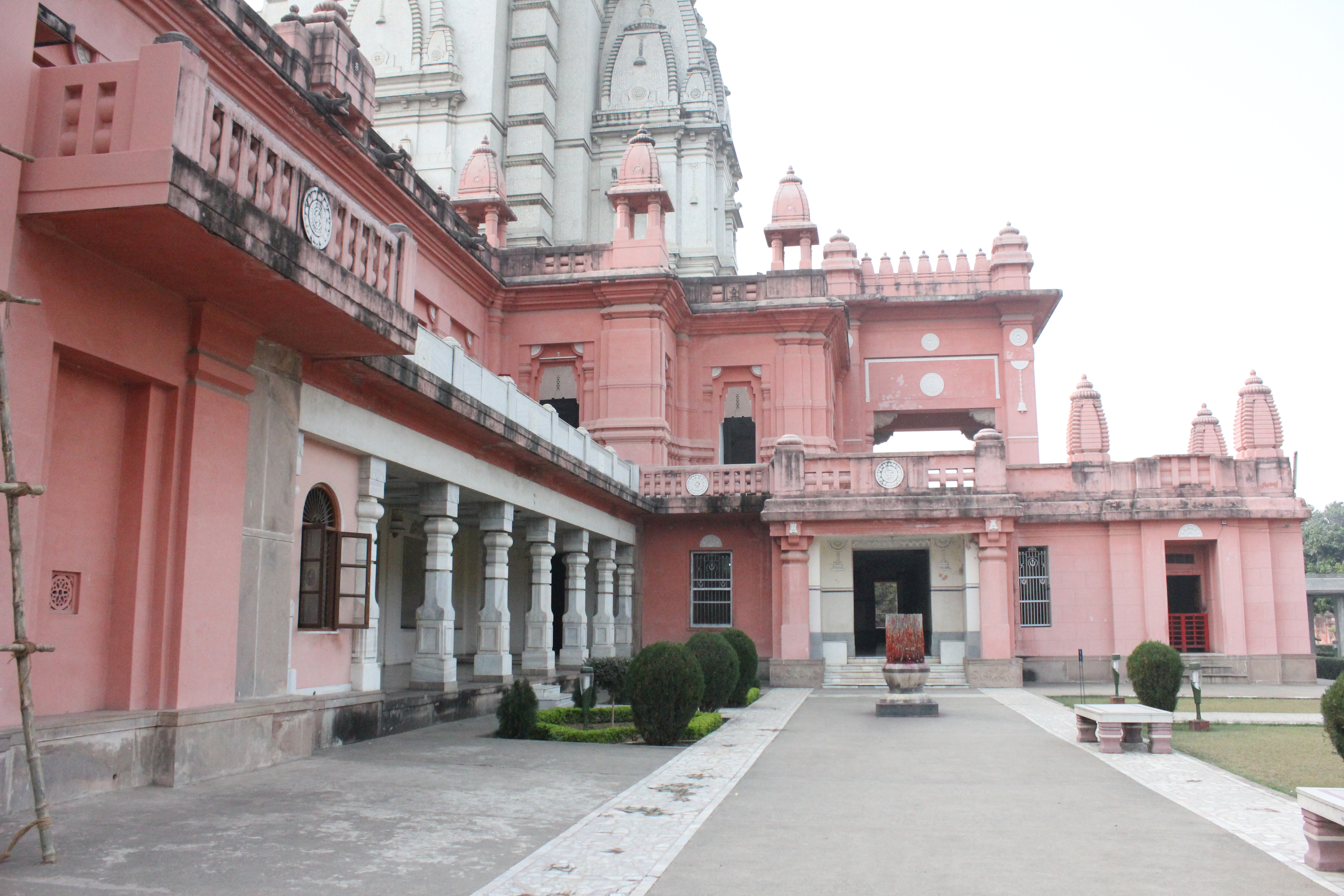
New Vishwanath Temple side view
- Shri Tilbhandeshwar Mahadev Mandir: Shri Tilbhandeshwar Mahadev Mandir is one of the oldest temples in Varanasi, located near Bengal Tola Inter College and next to the famous weavers colony of Madanpura. It is said that, here, Tilbhandeshwar Shiva Lingam increases by a nominal length every year. Besides Tilbhandeshwar Mahadev, Vibhandeshwar, Parvati, Bhairava, Ayyappan and other Hindu deities are visible here. This temple represents a unique combination of Malyali and Banarsi culture. Famous celebrations here include Mahashivaratri, Makar Sankranti, Shravan, Navratri, Ayyappan Puja etc.
- Nepali Mandir: Constructed in the 19th century A.D by the King of Nepal, Maharajadhiraja Rana Bahadur Shah, the temple is a replica of the Pashupatinath Temple in Kathmandu. Temple is also known as Kanthwala Mandir and Mini Khajuraho.
- Ratneshwar Mahadev temple is the leaning temple near the Manikarnika Ghat (the Burning Ghat). A lower part of the temple remains submerged into the river at times making it impossible to perform worship and rituals.

== Shakti temples ==
- Annapurna Devi Mandir: Annapurna Devi Mandir is located near the Kashi Vishwanath temple, there is a nice temple of Devi Annapurna, believed to be the "Goddess of Food". She is a form of Parvati. She is also known as Kashipuraadeeshwari ("Queen of Kasi").
- Vishalakshi Temple: Vishalakshi Temple is dedicated to Vishalakshi (means wide-eyed) or Parvati, the consort of Lord Shiva
- Lalita Gauri Mandir: Temple dedicated to the goddess Lalita Gauri
- Amethi Temple: Temple dedicated to the goddess Bala Tripurasundari
- Durga Kund Mandir: The architecture of Durga Mandir is of a Nagara style, which is typical of North India. The temple has a rectangular tank of water called the Durga Kund ("Kund" meaning a pond or pool.) The temple has multi-tiered spires and is stained red with ochre, representing the red colour of Durga. The Kund was initially connected directly to the river thus the water was automatically replenished. This channel was later closed, locking off the water supply, which is replenished only by rain or drainage from the Temple. Every year on the occasion of Nag Panchami, the act of depictingVishnu reclining on the coiled-up mystical snake or "kaliya" is recreated in the Kund.
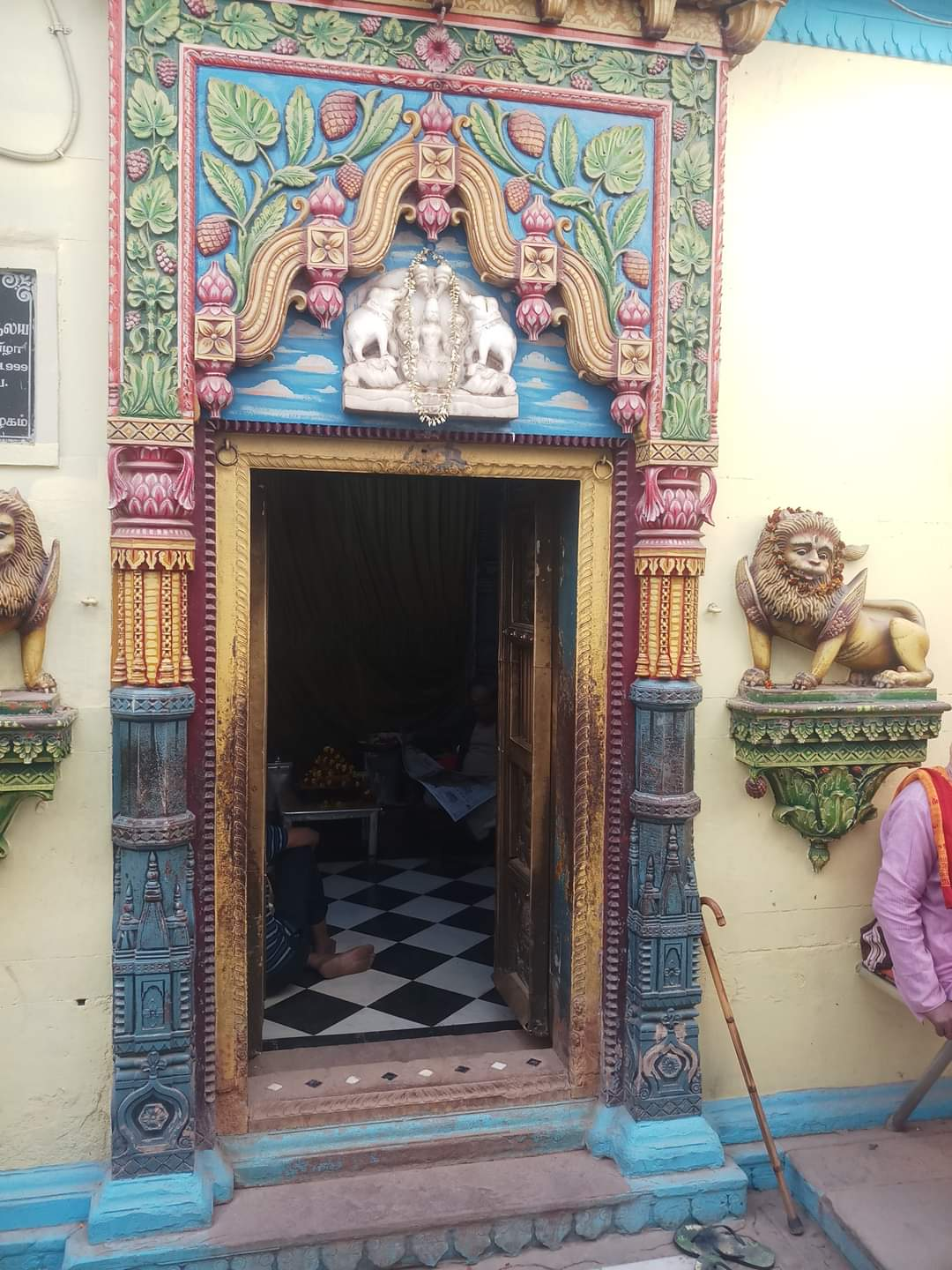
Vishalakshi Temple

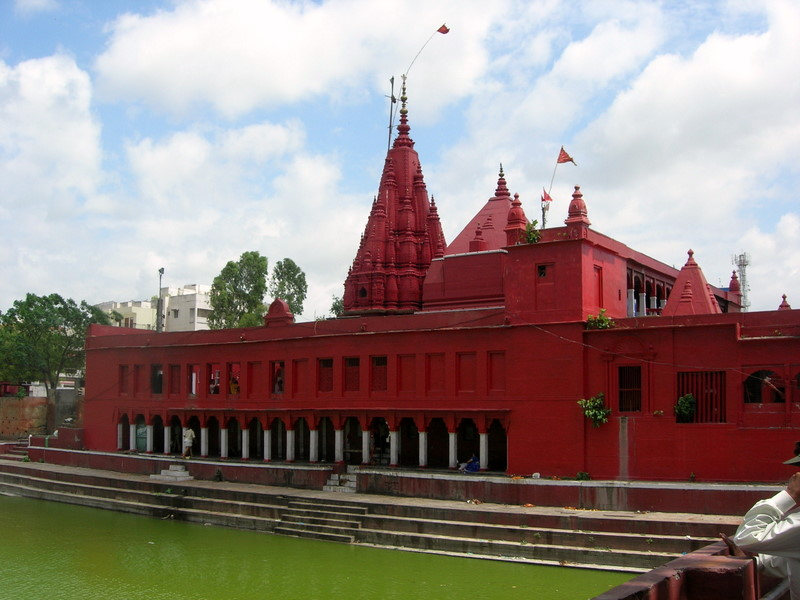
18th century Durga Temple, overlooking the Durga Kund
- Sankata Devi Mandir: Sankata Devi Mandir is situated near the Sindhia Ghat, there is an important temple of the "Goddess of Remedy", Devi Sankatha. Inside its premises there is a huge statue of a lion. There are also nine temples of nine planets near to this temple

== Vishnu ==
In addition to Shiva and Shakti temples, some of the most important ancient temples in Varanasi are dedicated to Vishnu.

- Adi Keshava temple is one of the oldest temples in Kashi and is considered as the oldest temple of Kashi, The temple finds a mention in the Kashi Khanda of the Skanda Puranam. This temple is considered to be older than Kashi Vishwanath Temple.
- Shree GopiGovind Temple is one of the oldest temples in Kashi and is considered as the oldest temple of Kashi, The temple finds a mention in the Kashi Khanda of the Skanda Puran in chapter 61 in shlok 19 .This temple is considered to be older than Kashi Vishwanath Temple. In Gopi Govind Teerth Lord Vishnu is present in the form of Gopi Govind. Worshippers of Gopi Govind shall always be blessed by Lord Vishnu. It is said in the Skand puran part 4 (kashi khand) in chapter 61 in shlok 19 that Madhav declared: One who worships Me with pure devotion as Gopi-Govinda at the sacred Gopi-Govinda Tirtha shall remain forever untouched by the veil of My Maya.
- Manikarnika Ghat Vishnu temple
- Bindu Madhav temple

== Hanuman ==
- Sankat Mochan Mandir: Sankat Mochan Mandir is dedicated to Hanuman. It is very popular with locals. It is the location for many yearly religious as well as cultural festivals. On 7 March 2006 one of the three explosions carried out by Islamic militants hit the temple, while the aarti, in which numerous worshippers and wedding attendees participated, was in progress.

== Surya ==
Varanasi has been home to numerous Surya-related temples. Predominantly Surya is worshipped in following twelve forms in Varanasi.

1. Arun Aditya
2. Drupad Aditya
3. Ganga Aditya
4. Keshava Aditya
5. Kakholkh Aditya
6. Lolark Aditya
7. Mayukh Aditya
8. Sambha Aditya
9. Uttarark Aditya
10. Vimal Aditya
11. Vriddh Aditya
12. Yama Aditya

== Others ==
- Bharat Mata Mandir: Bharat Mata Mandir ("Mother India Temple") is located on the Mahatma Gandhi Kashi Vidyapith campus in Varanasi, India. Instead of traditional statues of gods and goddesses, this temple has a huge map of undivided India carved in marble. This temple is dedicated to Bharat Mata (Mother India) and was the first of its kind in the world.
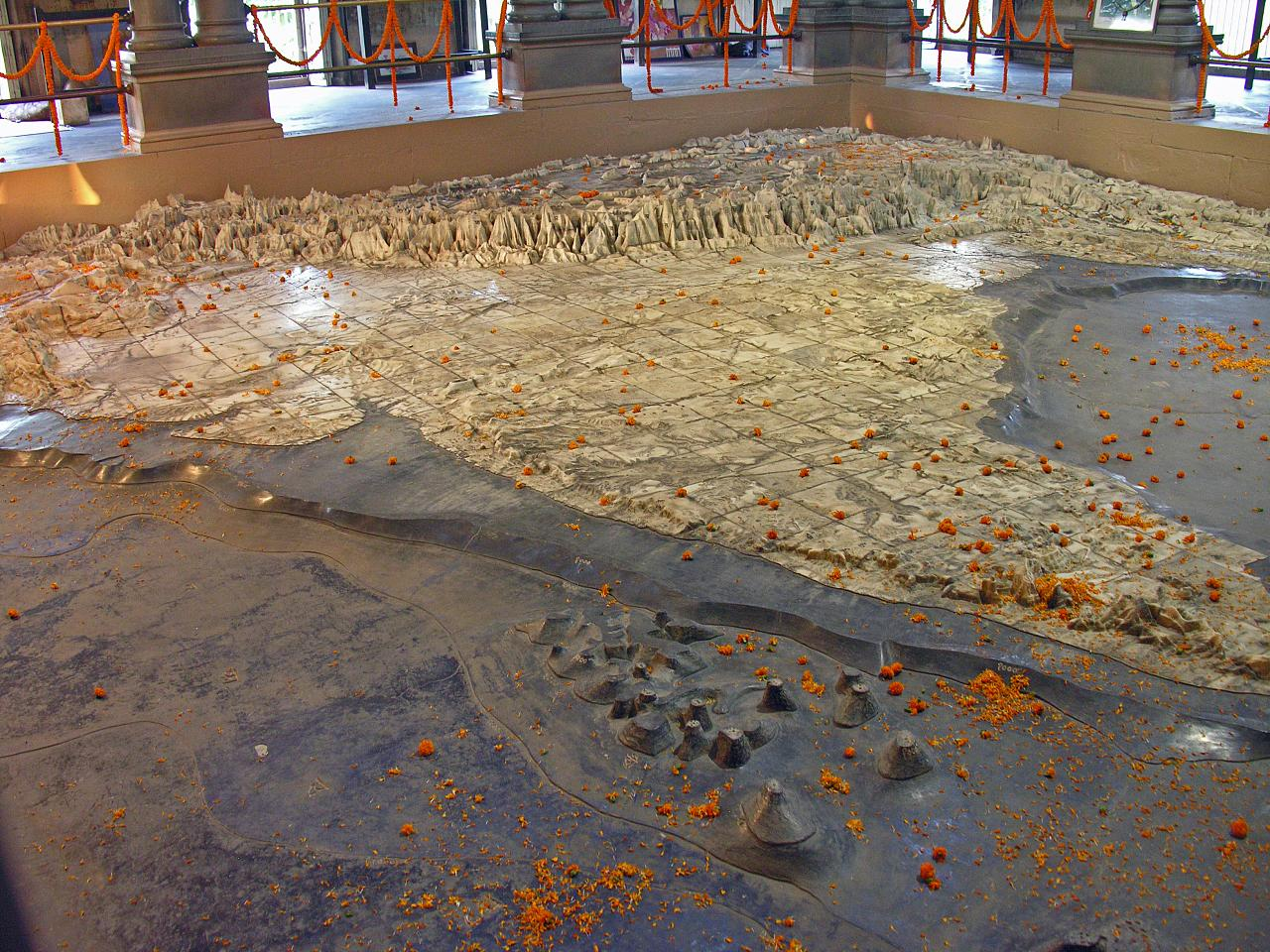
Relief map of India in Bharat Mata Mandir

=== Bhojpuri Maai Mandir ===
Bhojpuri Maai Mandir ("Mother Bhojpuri Temple") is a temple in which the presiding deity is Bhojpuri Maai, representing the Bhojpuri language. This temple is located in Jeevandeep Public School campus, Baralalpur, Varanasi, India. There are around 150 million Bhojpuriyas in the world and they give Bhojpuri language the same status as their mother. It is one of the temples in the world for worshipping a language as a god or goddess.

=== Dhanvantari ===
In Varanaseya Sanskrit Vishwavidyalaya, Varanasi, Uttar Pradesh state, one statue of Dhanvantari is present in the university museum.

Maharaja Divodas(Grand son of Dhanvantari First king of Kashi) One Black stoned statue facing south is situated in a personal property of a Brahman family in Chowk area, varanasi. It's said that the Idol was found beneath the premises of that property when it was getting constructed and the Brahman couldn't figure out who it was hence decided to have it drifted in Ganga next morning, however same night lord came in his dream and introduced himself as KashiRaja Divodas and asked to remain his idol where it was found, hence he built this temple in his house and his successors are still serving the deity there. This temple said to be quite awakened and spiritual as the idol emerged on its own and it is a local belief that if someone worships here with all his faith, deity cures his illness. Address- CK 14/42, Nandan Sahu Lane

=== Saints and scholars ===
- Tulsi Manas Mandir: Tulsi Manas Mandir is dedicated to Lord Rama. It is situated at the place where Tulsidas, the great medieval seer, lived and wrote the epic "Shri Ramcharitmanas", which narrates the life of Rama, the hero of the Ramayana. Verses from Tulsidas’ epic are inscribed on the walls. It is close to the Durga Temple.
- Vyasa Mandir: Situated in Ramnagar, Vyasa Mandir is dedicated to Vyasa, author of the Mahabharata

== Damage and destruction ==
Varanasi and its Hindu temples were a target for raids and destruction during the Islamic invasion and rule of the Indian subcontinent. Various Sultans and Mughal emperors demolished Hindu temples and built mosques in their place starting in late 12th-century, particularly between the 13th-century and 18th-century, such as in the reign of Aurangzeb. The destruction of Hindu temples in Varanasi was widespread over time, with Aurangzeb even trying to change the name of the city from Benares to Muhammadabad.
