= Sankata Devi Mandir =

Hindu Temple in Uttar Pradesh, India

- संकटा देवी मंदिर
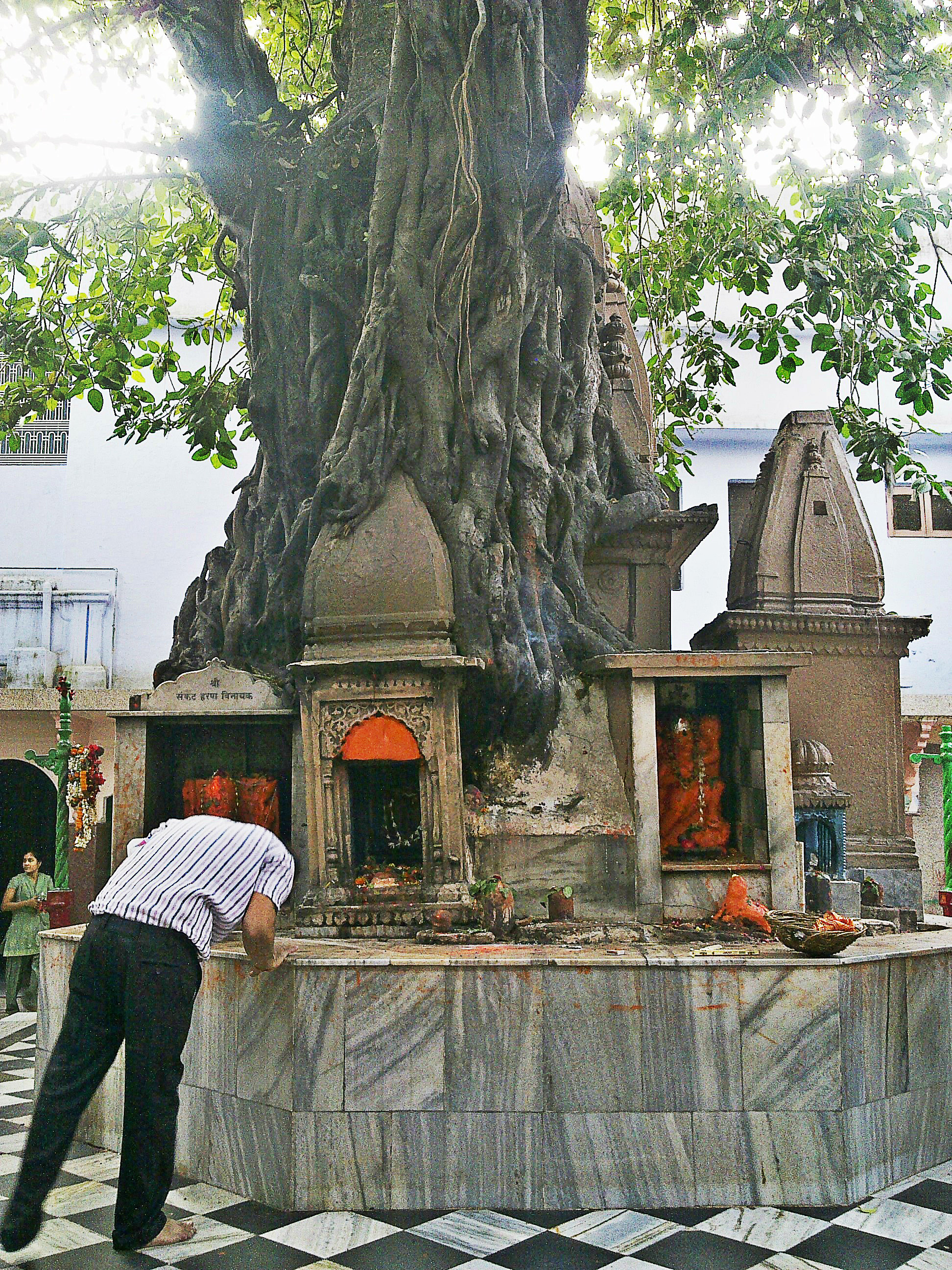

- Temple location on Varanasi district map

Religion
- Affiliation: Hinduism
- District: Varanasi
- Deity: Sankata Devi
- Festival: Navratri

Location
- Location: Sankata Ghat, Varanasi, India
- State: Uttar Pradesh
- Country: India
- Interactive map of Sankata Devi Mandir
- Coordinates: 25.312687°N 83.015277°E

Architecture
- Type: Nagara
- Creator: King of Baroda
- Completed: 18th century
- Elevation: 86.392 m (283 ft)

Sankata Devi Mandir (Hindi: संकटा देवी मंदिर), also known as Sankata Mata Mandir or simply Sankata Mandir; often referred to with prefix of Sri, is one of the most famous temples in the holy city of Varanasi. This temple has great religious importance in Hinduism and is dedicated to the goddess Sankata Devi (Goddess of danger). The Mandir was constructed in 18th century by King of Baroda. It is believed that this is the only temple in India dedicated to Sankata Devi.

== History ==
In the late 18th century, the King of Baroda constructed the Sankata Ghat. At the same time, the Sankata Devi Mandir was also constructed. In the year 1825, the ghat was made pucca by the widow of Brahmin Pandit.

== Religious importance ==
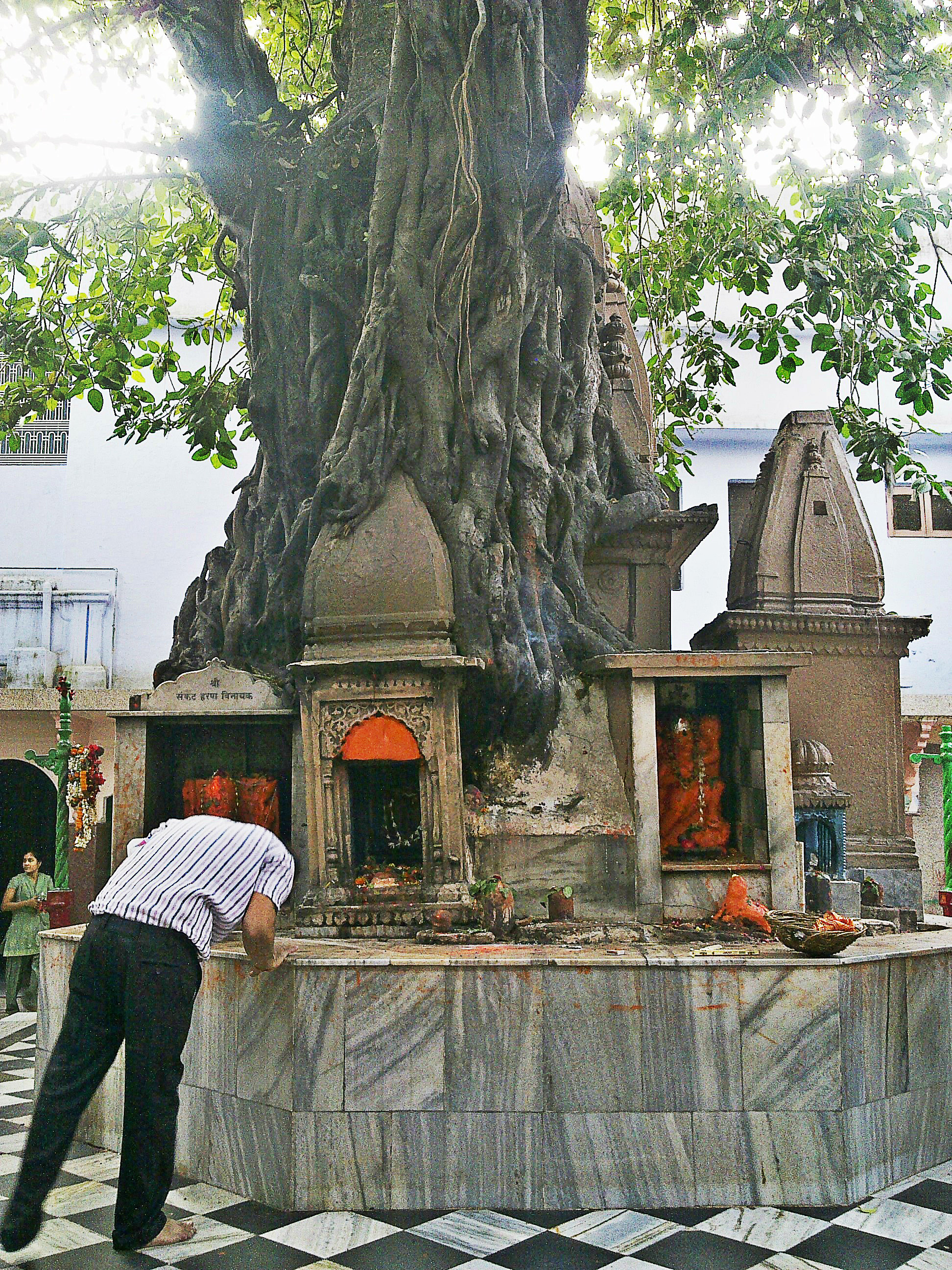
Shrines in Sankata Devi temple courtyard

The name "Sankata" has been derived from the Sanskrit word "sankat" (Hindi: स‌ंकट) which means "danger". Goddess Sankata Devi was originally a Matrika. In Puranas, she is referred to as "Vikat Matrika" ('the fierce mother'). Sankata Devi is believed to have ten hands and the power to protect faraway husbands and to ensure their safe return.

During the Navratri, the eighth day is dedicated to Goddess Sankata Devi. The devotees pray to the deity to avoid any danger in life or to alleviate any present crisis. It is also believed that the Pandavas, during their exile, paid homage to Sankata Devi.

== See also ==
- Hindu temples in Varanasi
- Mata Mawai Dham
