= Tulsi Manas Mandir =

Hindu Temple in Varansi, Uttar Pradesh, India

- तुलसी मानस मंदिर
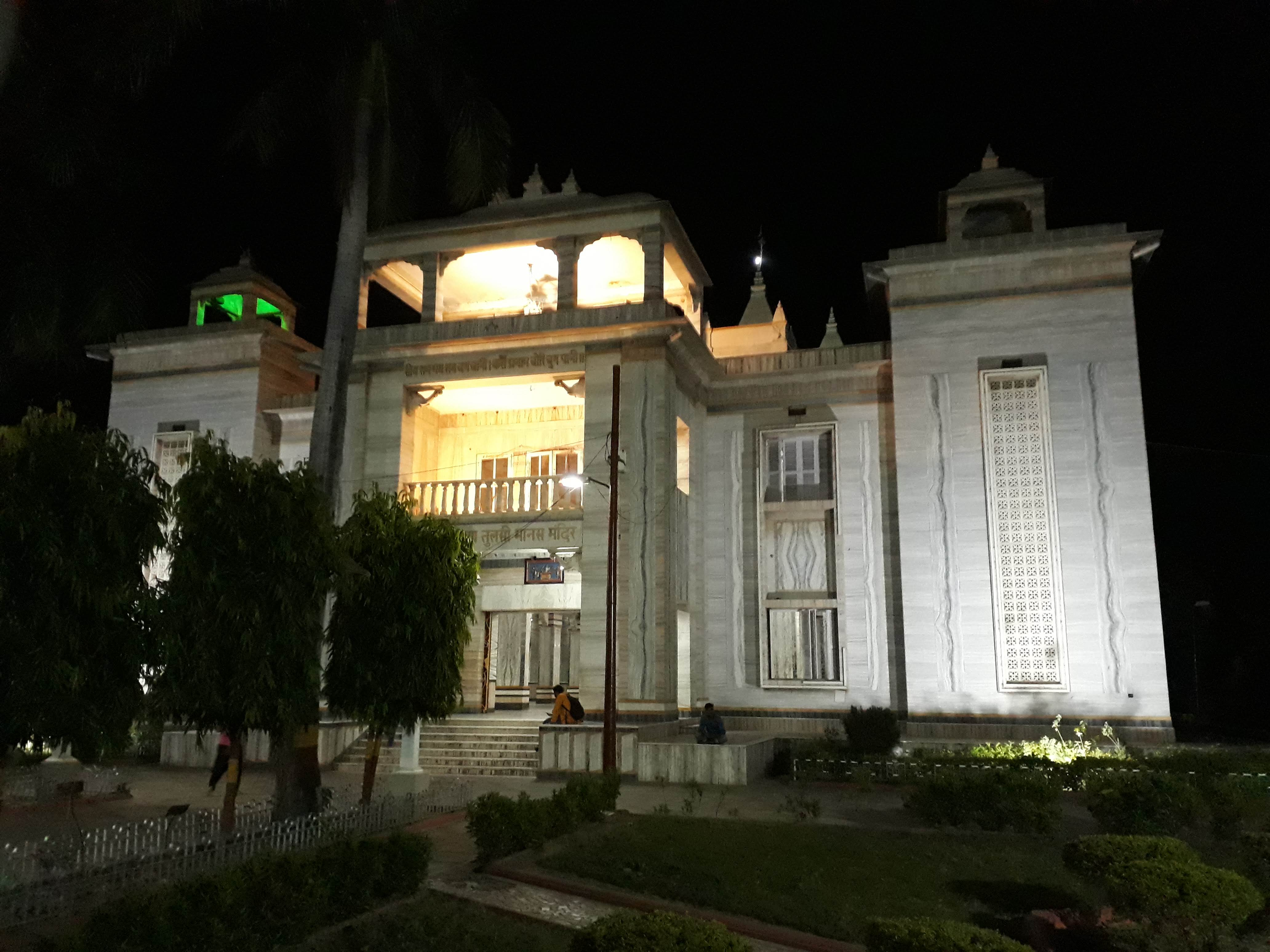

- Temple location on Varanasi district map

Religion
- Affiliation: Hinduism
- District: Varanasi
- Deity: Rama

Location
- Location: Durga Kund, Bhelupur, Varanasi
- State: Uttar Pradesh
- Country: India
- Coordinates: 25.287206°N 83.000417°E

Architecture
- Creator: Sureka family of Howrah, West Bengal, India
- Completed: 1964
- Elevation: 85 m (279 ft)

Tulsi Manas Mandir (Hindi: तुलसी मानस मंदिर) is one of the most famous temples in the holy city of Varanasi. This temple has great historical and cultural importance in Hinduism since the ancient Hindu epic Ramcharitmanas was originally written at this place by Hindu poet-saint, reformer and philosopher Goswami Tulsidas in the 16th century (c. 1532–1623).

== History ==
One of the famous Hindu epics, Ramayan was originally written in Sanskrit language by Sanskrit poet Valmiki between 500 and 100 BC. Being in Sanskrit language, this epic was not accessible to and understood by masses. In the 16th century, Goswami Tulsidas wrote the Ramayan in Awadhi dialect of Hindi language and the Awadhi version was called Ramcharitmanas (meaning Lake of the deeds of Rama).

In 1964, the Sureka family constructed a temple at the same place where Goswami Tulsidas wrote Ramcharitmanas.

== Construction ==
Construction finished in 1964 and was funded by the Thakur Das Sureka family of Bandhaghat, Howrah, West Bengal. The temple was constructed in white marble and landscaping all around the temple. Verses and scenes (pictorials) from Ramcharitmanas are engraved on the marble walls all over the temple.

Philip Lutgendorf, describing the temple in the 1980s, noted that the entire text of the Ramcharitmanas is inscribed in marble on two levels of its inner walls, and that the temple also contains a life-sized mechanical image of Tulsidas reciting the epic from a recording, a library of Ramayana-related literature, and electrified dioramas of mythological scenes that visitors may view for a small fee. Each year in the month of Shravan (July–August) the temple grounds host a fair whose centrepiece is an exhibition of motorised dioramas depicting the major episodes of the Manas.

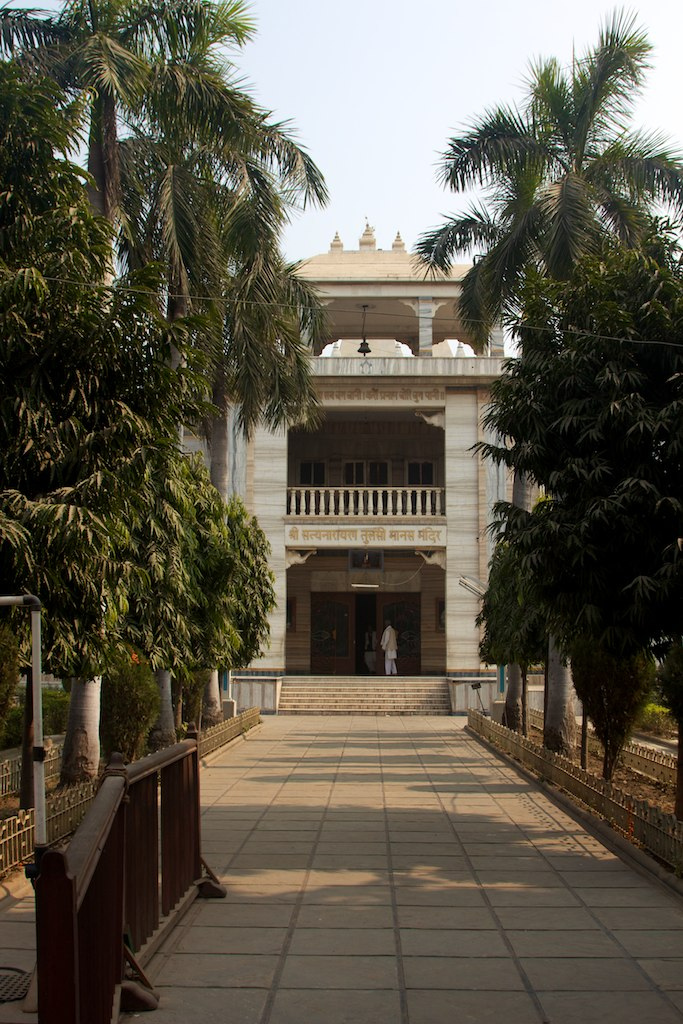
Entrance to the temple.

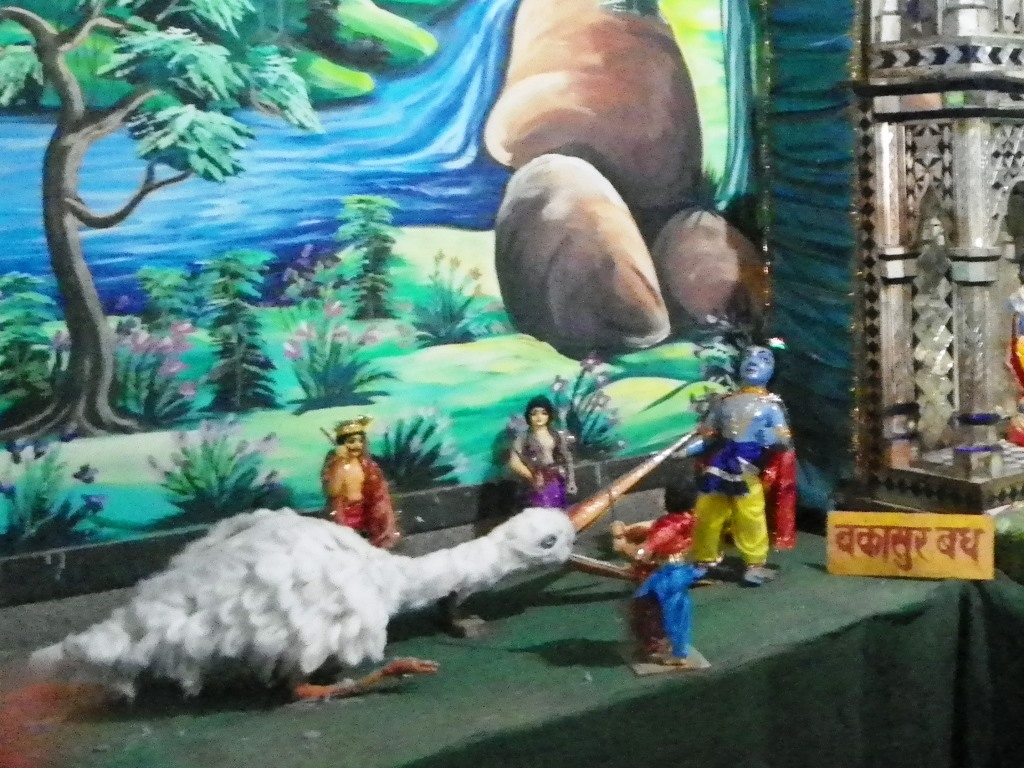
Figurines in Tulsi Manas Mandir

== Location ==
Tulsi Manas Mandir is situated on the Sankat Mochan road, 250 meters south of Durga Kund, 700 meters north-east of Sankat Mochan Mandir and 1.3 kilometers north of Banaras Hindu University.

== Historical importance ==
Due to Ramcharitmanas, the epic Ramayan was read by larger number of people, who otherwise could not have read Ramayan since it was in Sanskrit. Reportedly, prior to Ramcharitmanas, the depiction of Lord Rama as Supreme God was quite subtle in Valmiki's Ramayana (as most of the Hindu religious scriptures are highly subtle in their meaning giving scope for more personal interpretation) but in Tulsidas's Ramcharitmanas this depiction was more obvious than Valmiki's Ramayana . The temple was inaugurated by Sarvepalli Radhakrishnan. The temple houses a museum with rare collection of manuscripts and artifacts.

== See also ==
- Durga Mandir
- Hindu temples in Varanasi
