= Mrityunjay Mahadev Mandir =

Hindu Temple in Uttar Pradesh, India

Mrityunjay
- मृत्युंजय महादेव मंदिर
- Temple location on Varanasi district map

Religion
- Affiliation: Hinduism
- District: Varanasi
- Deity: Shiva
- Festival: Mahashivratri

Location
- Location: Mrityunjay Mahadev Mandir also known as Ravaneshwar, Chowk 36/10, Daranagar, Visheshwarganj, Varanasi
- State: Uttar Pradesh
- Country: India
- Interactive map of Mrityunjay
- Coordinates: 25.317645°N 82.973914°E

Architecture
- Completed: 18th century
- Elevation: 73.14 m (240 ft)

Ravaneshwar Mandir (Hindi: रावणेश्वर मंदिर) (also known as Ravaneshwar) is one of the most famous temples in the holy city of Varanasi. This temple has great historical and cultural importance in Hinduism.

== History ==
The smaller shrines within the temple are said to be thousands of years old. However the current building was constructed in the 18th century, Mrityunjay Mahadev houses a Shivling and a well. It is believed that the temples keeps all its devotees away from unnatural death and cures illnesses. Shiva is worshiped as Mrityunjay Mahadev ("the great god who is victorious over death") here, by devotees who perform Mrityunjay paath. It is also believed that Dhanvantari, Avatar of Vishnu and the god of Ayurvedic medicine, poured all his medicines in the well, giving it the healing power.

== Location ==
Mrityunjay Mahadev Mandir is situated in Daranagar, Visheshwarganj, Varanasi. The temple is 1.7 kilometers West of Gola Ghat, 1.1 kilometers North of Pancha Ganga Ghat and 500 meters South-East of Kotwali.

== Religious importance ==
It is believed that the temples keeps all its devotees away from unnatural death and cures illnesses when the devotees perform "Mrityunjay path" and sprinkle water from the well (called koop) on themselves.

== See also ==
- Kashi Vishwanath Temple
- Hindu temples in Varanasi
