= Nepali Mandir =

Hindu Temple in Uttar Pradesh, India

- Nepali Mandir in Varanasi

- Temple location on Varanasi district map

Religion
- Affiliation: Hinduism
- District: Varanasi
- Deity: Lord Shiva
- Festivals: Mahashivratri; Nag Panchami

Location
- Location: Lalita Ghat, Varanasi
- State: Uttar Pradesh
- Country: India
- Coordinates: 25.309821°N 83.012859°E

Architecture
- Type: Pagoda
- Creator: Rana Bahadur Shah & Girvan Yuddha Bikram Shah (Kings of Nepal)
- Completed: 1843
- Elevation: 78.161 m (256 ft)

Shri Samrajeswar Pashupatinath Mahadev Mandir, (Note: Nepali: श्री साम्राजेश्वर पशुपतिनाथ महादेव मन्दिर; Hindi: श्री साम्राजेश्वर पशुपतिनाथ महादेव मंदिर) also known as the Nepali Mandir, (Note: Nepali: नेपाली मन्दिर; Hindi: नेपाली मंदिर) Kanthwala Mandir, (Note: Nepali: कन्थवाला मन्दिर; Hindi: कन्थवाला मंदिर) and Mini Khajuraho, (Note: Nepali: मिनी खजुराहो; Hindi: मिनी खजुराहो) is one of the oldest and most famous temples in the holy city of Varanasi. The temple holds great religious importance in Hinduism and is dedicated to the Lord Shiva. Constructed in the 19th century by the Kings of Nepal, the temple is built using terracotta, stone and wood and is replica of the Pashupatinath Temple in Kathmandu, Nepal.

== History ==
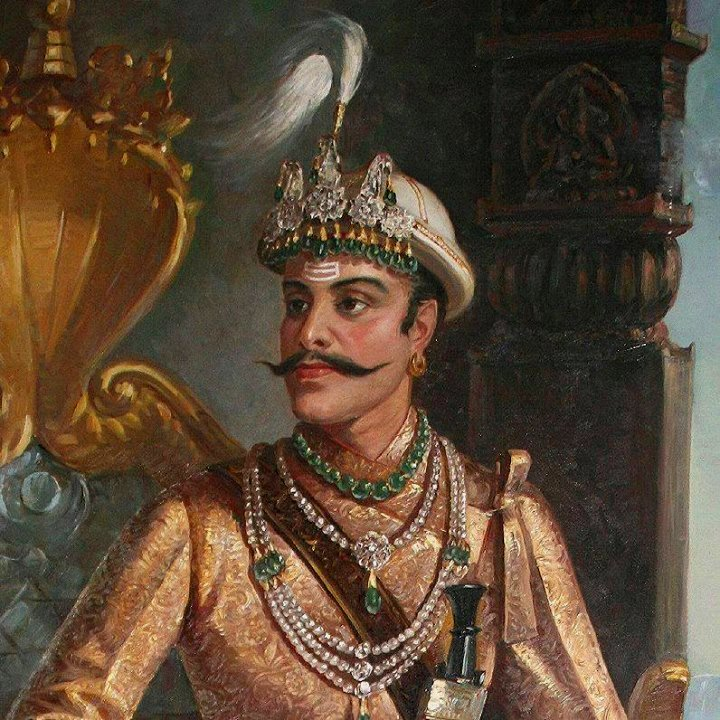
Rana Bahadur Shah (1775–1806).

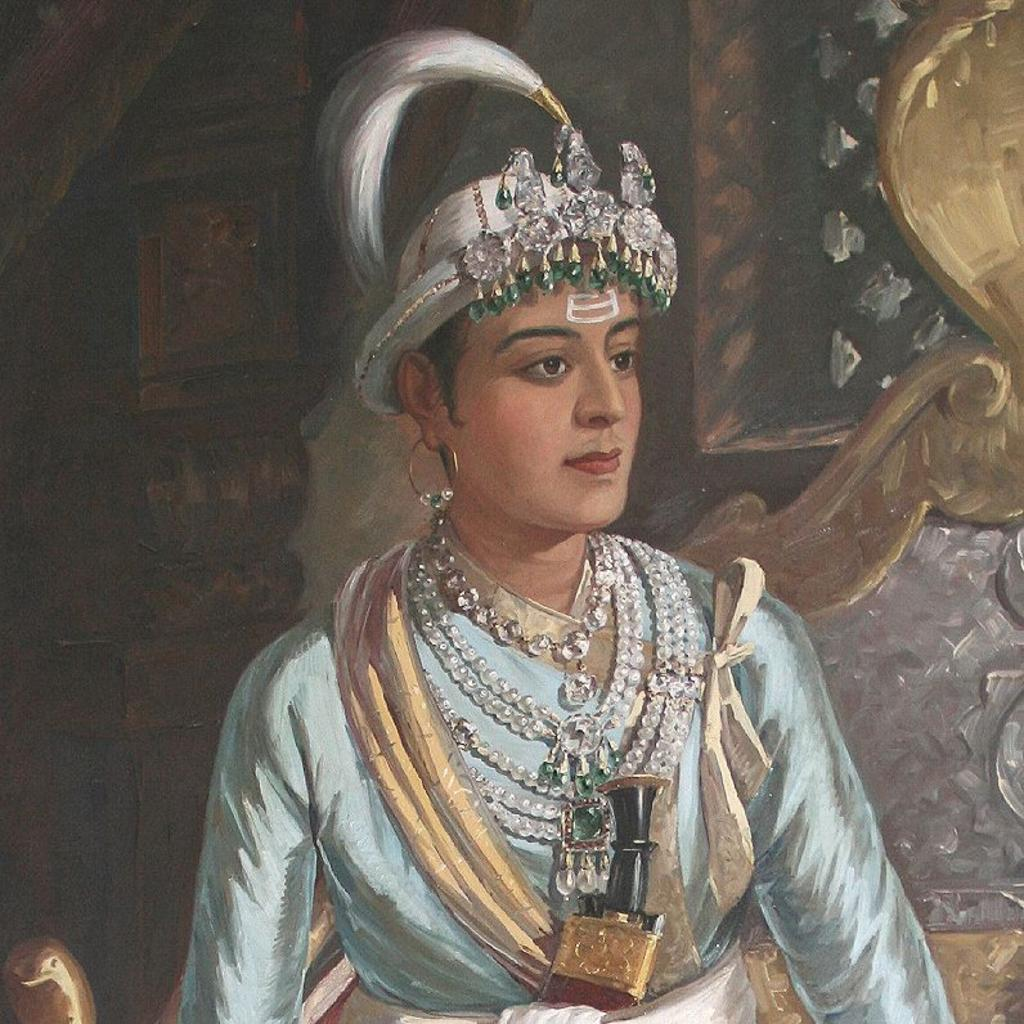
Girvan Yuddha Bikram Shah (1797–1816).

The King of Nepal, Rana Bahadur Shah took exile in Varanasi from 1800 to 1804 and titled himself as "Swami Nirgunanda". During his exile, he decided to build a replica of Pashupatinath Temple in Varanasi. Construction began during his stay there. However, Shah returned to Kingdom of Nepal on March 1804 before the temple was completed. On 25 April 1806, Rana Bahadur Shah was beheaded on the spot by his half-brother, Sher Bahadur Shah, after threatening him with execution. His son, Girvan Yuddha Bikram Shah, later completed the project around 20 years after its originally intended completion date. In 1842, the land was transferred to Rana Bahadur Shah by Kashi Naresh. The temple complex along with the surrounding area, Lalita Ghat, and a dharamshala, is owned by the Government of Nepal.

== Construction ==
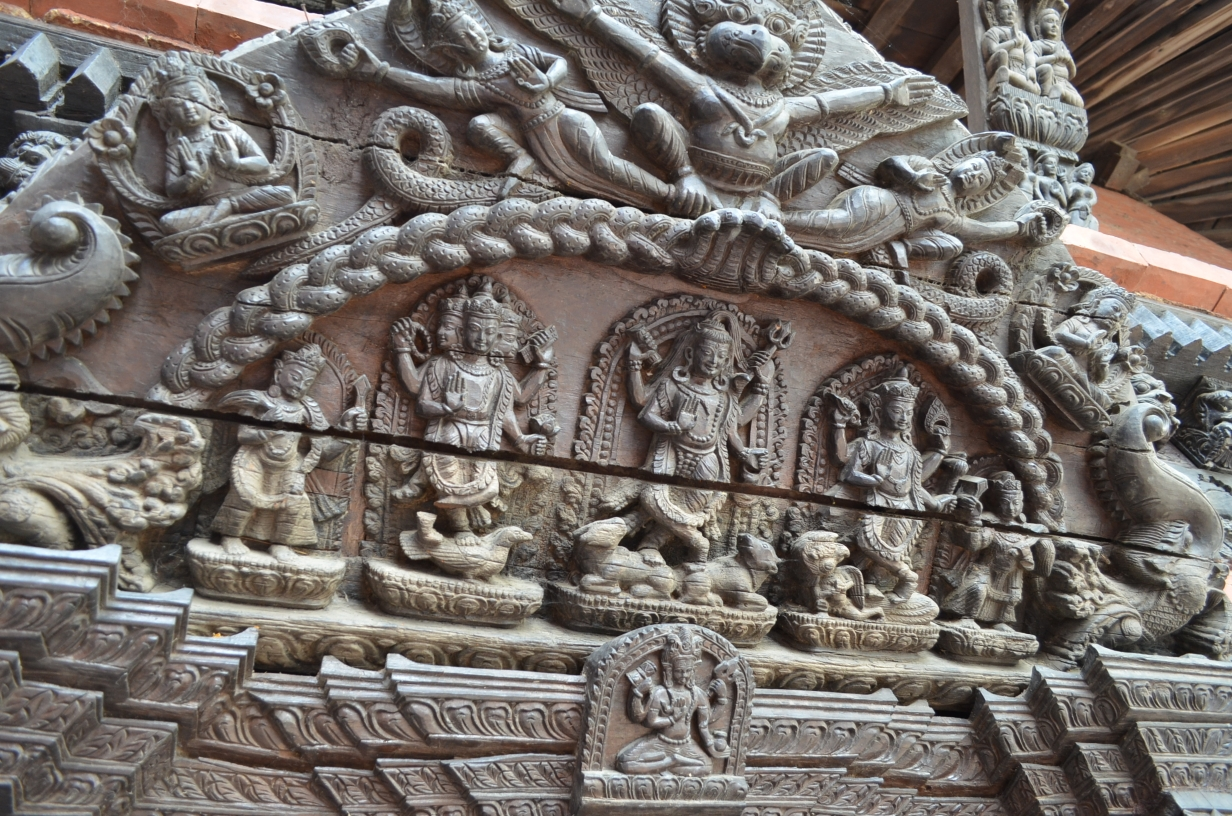
Nepali Mandir, Lalita Ghat, Vanarasi.

The temple is built using terracotta, stone and wood and took three decades to complete. The wood is termite proof. It is constructed in Nepali architecture style and is surrounded by tamarind and ficus religiosa (peepal) trees. The temple has Pagoda style architecture, mainly carved out of wood. It has sculptures similar to ones displayed in Khajuraho Group of Monuments and hence it is also called "Mini Khajuraho".

== Location ==
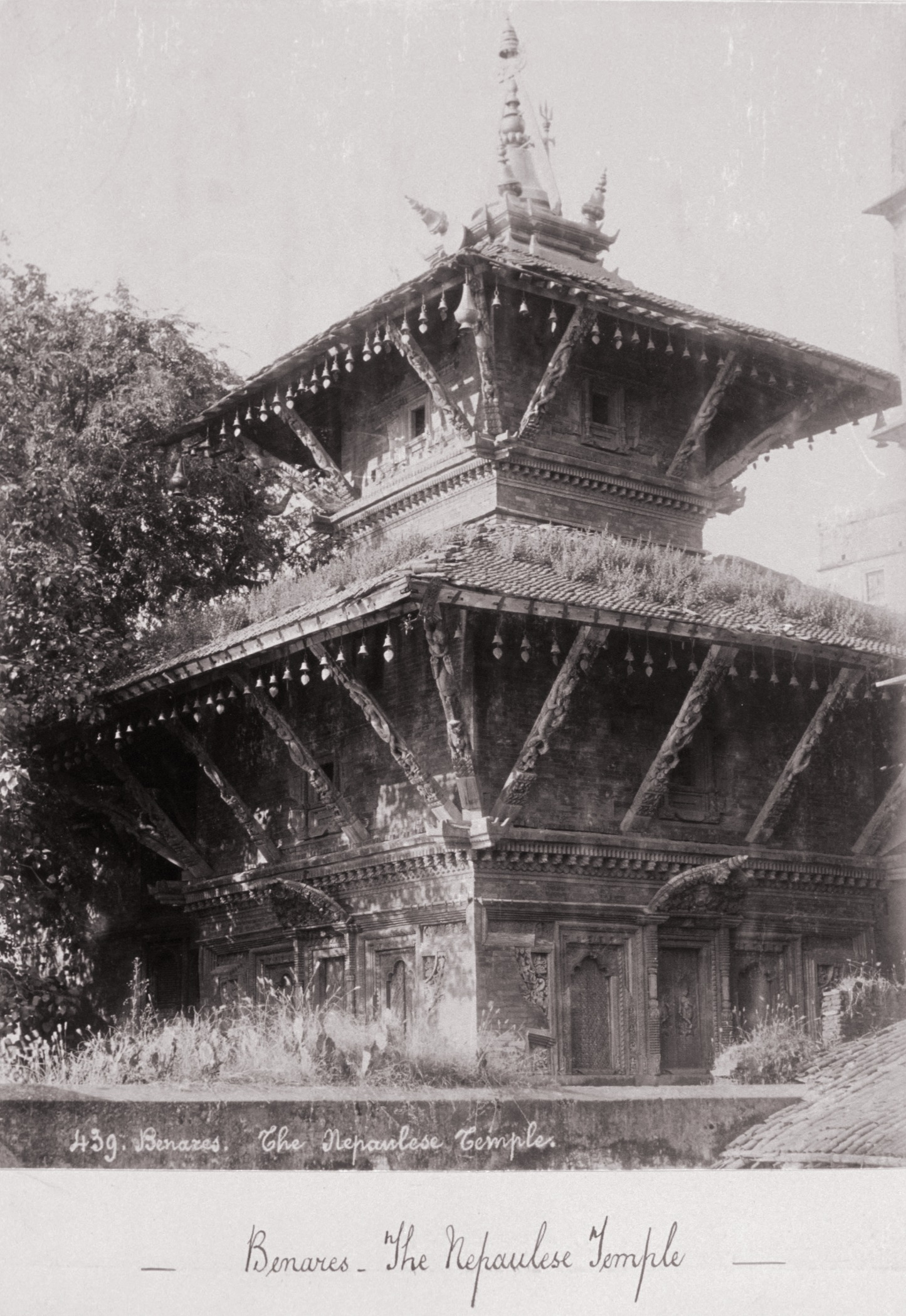
The Nepalese Temple – Varanasi, photographed by Samuel Bourne in the late 1860s.

Nepali Mandir is located on Lalita Ghat in Varanasi. It is 3.8 kilometers South-East of Varanasi Junction railway station and 100 meters South-West of Manikarnika Ghat.

== See also ==
- Pashupatinath Temple
- Hindu temples in Varanasi
