= Lalita Ghat =

- ललिता घाट (Hindi)
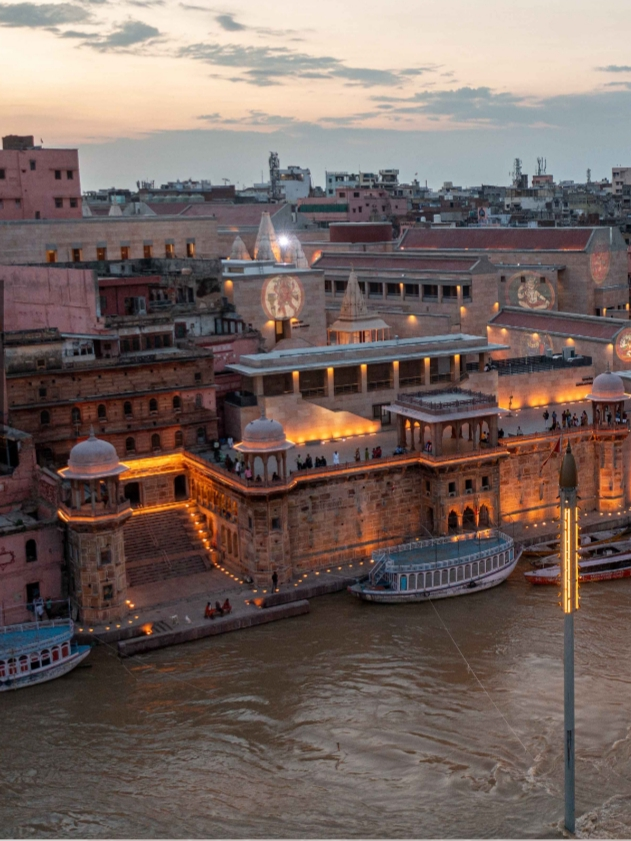
- Lalita Ghat during High Tide, at Night Time.

- Location of Lalita Ghat in Varanasi map
- 25.310013°N 83.013276°E
- Location: Varanasi

History
- Founded: 1800-1804
- Founder: Rana Bahadur Shah
- Built: 19th century

Site notes
- Elevation: 73.9 m (242 ft)
- Governing body: Varanasi Nagar Nigam
- Owner: Varanasi Nagar Nigam

Lalita Ghat (Hindi: ललिता घाट) is one of the main ghats on the Ganges River in Varanasi, Uttar Pradesh. The ghat is named after Hindu Goddess Lalita and was built in early 19th century by King of Nepal, Rana Bahadur Shah. The ghat houses the famous Nepali Mandir and Lalita Gauri Mandir.

== History ==
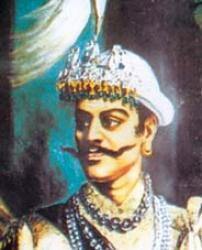
Rana Bahadur Shah, King of Nepal

The King of Nepal, Rana Bahadur Shah took exile in Varanasi from 1800 to 1804 and titled himself as "Swami Nirgunanda". During his exile, he decided to build a replica of Pashupatinath Temple in Varanasi. Construction of the temple commenced during his exile / stay in Varanasi. During the construction, Shah moved back to Nepal. On 25 April 1806, Rana Bahadur Shah was stabbed to death by his stepbrother, Sher Bahadur Shah. His son Girvan Yuddha Bikram Shah Deva undertook the construction of the temple (now called Nepali Mandir), a dharamshala and Lalita Ghat. The construction got over 20 years after the deadline.

== Significance and religious belief ==
The ghat is named after Hindu Goddess Lalita. Goddess Lalita is one of the group of ten goddesses of Hindu belief, collectively called Mahavidyas or Dasha-Mahavidyas. She is the foremost and the most important in Dasha-Mahavidyas. All other Mahavidyas concludes in her vidya i.e. Sri Vidya. Her consort is Maha Kameswara. She is the highest aspect of Goddess Adi Shakti. Parvati is the complete incarnation of Lalita Maha Tripura Sundari.

Affiliated to this site are the well known Lingam of Ganga Keshava; shrines of Gangatitya, Kashi Devi, Lalita Devi and Bhagirath Tirtha. It is a popular belief that a glimpse of Lalita Devi brings the same blessings as circumambulating the entire world. It is also believed that blessings of the Goddess Lalita eliminates problems and brings prosperity.

== Location ==
Lalita Ghat is situated on the bank of Ganges. It is 3.8 kilometers South-East of Varanasi Junction railway station and 100 meters South-West of Manikarnika Ghat.

== See also ==
- Nepali Mandir
- Lalita Gauri Mandir
