= Durga Mandir, Varanasi =

Hindu Temple in Uttar Pradesh, India

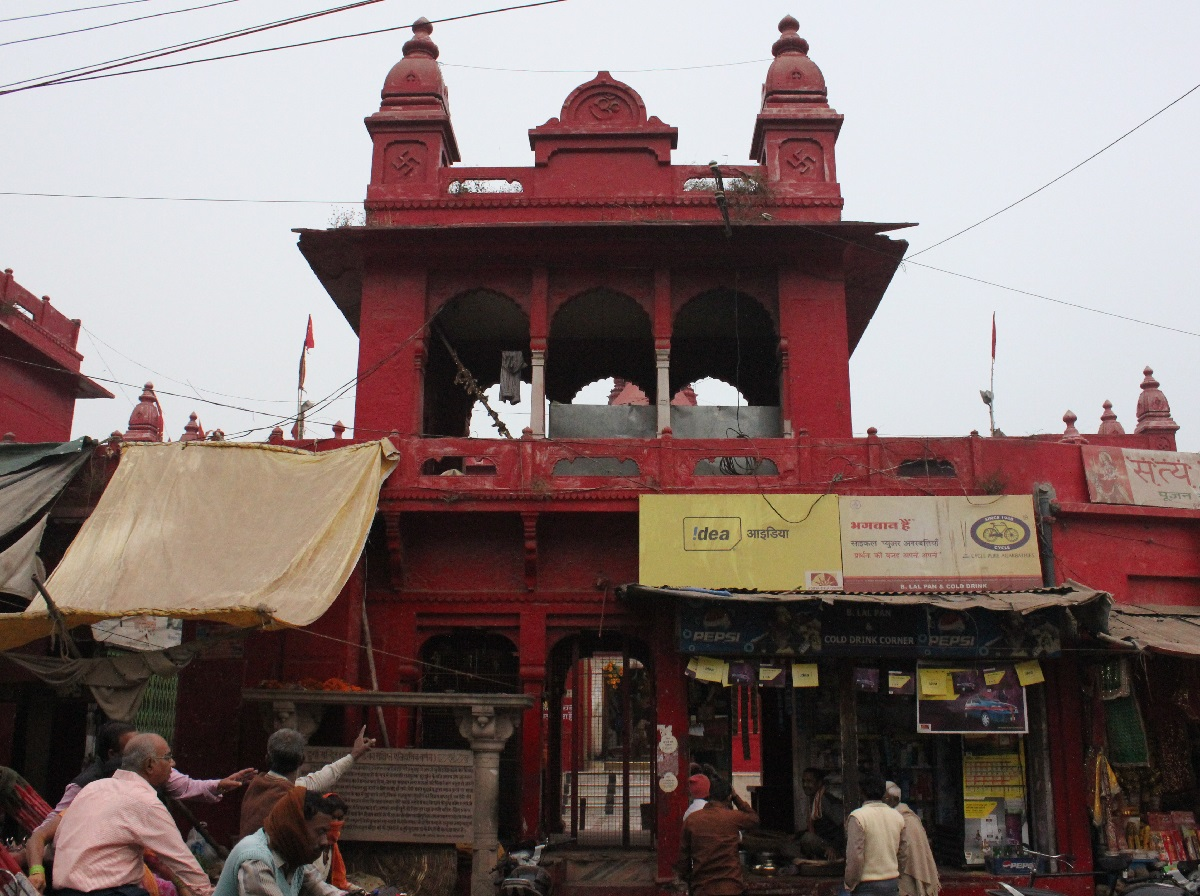
- Main entrance of Durga Mandir

- Temple location on Varanasi district map Durga Mandir, Varanasi (Uttar Pradesh)

Religion
- Affiliation: Hinduism
- District: Varanasi
- Deity: Durga
- Festivals: Durga Puja; Navratri

Location
- Location: Durga Kund, Bhelupur, Varanasi
- State: Uttar Pradesh
- Country: India
- Interactive map of Durga Mandir, Varanasi
- Coordinates: 25.288622°N 82.999279°E

Architecture
- Type: Nagara
- Creator: Rani Bhabani of Natore
- Completed: 18th century
- Elevation: 85 m (279 ft)

Durga Mandir (Hindi: दुर्गा मंदिर), also known as Durga Kund Mandir and Durga Temple, is one of the most famous temples in the holy city of Varanasi. This temple has great religious importance in Hinduism and is dedicated to Durga. Durga Mandir was constructed in 18th century by Rani Bhabani of Natore.

== History ==
Durga Mandir was constructed in 18th century by Bengali Maharani- Rani Bhabani of Natore. The temple is dedicated to the Goddess Durga. Next to the temple, is a kund (pond) which was earlier connected to the river Ganges. It is believed that the existing icon of the goddess was not made by a man but appeared on its own in the temple.

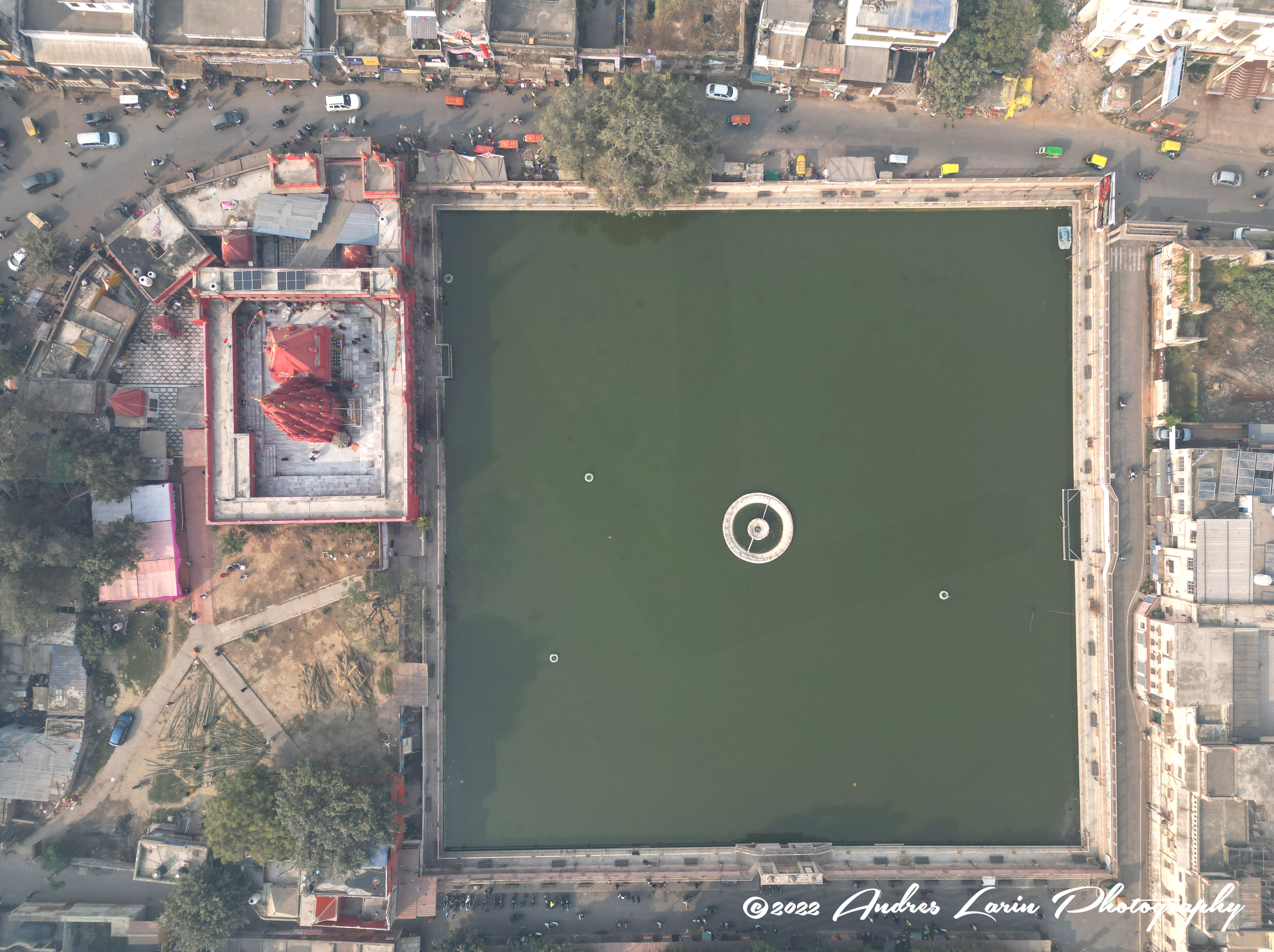
Drone shot of a Durga Mandir in Varanasi, 2022

In adhyaya (chapter) 23 of the Devi-Bhagavata Purana, this temple's origin is explained. As per the text, Kashi Naresh (king of Varanasi) called for a Swayamvar for his daughter Sashikala's marriage. The King later learnt that the princess was in love with vanvasi prince Sudarshan. So Kashi Naresh got his daughter secretly married to the prince. When the other Kings (who were invited for Swayamvar) got to know about the marriage, they got angry and went on war with Kashi Naresh. Sudarshan then offered prayers to Durga, who came on a lion and fought the war for Kashi Naresh and Sudarshan. After the war, Kashi Naresh pleaded to Durga to protect Varanasi and with that belief, this temple was constructed.

== Construction ==
Durga Mandir was constructed in the 18th century (exact date of construction not known) by a Hindu Bengali Rani - Rani Bhabani of Natore. (Bengali queen). The temple was built in North Indian Nagara style of architecture. The temple is painted red with ochre to match the colours of the central icon of Durga, the goddess of strength and power. Inside the temple, many elaborately carved and engraved stones can be found. The temple is made up of many small sikharas conjoined together.

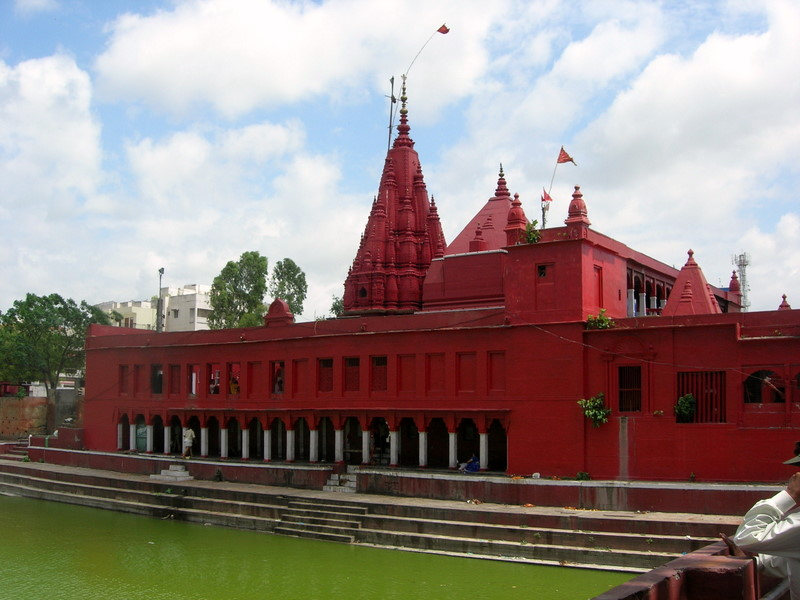
Mandir as seen from north corner of Durgakund

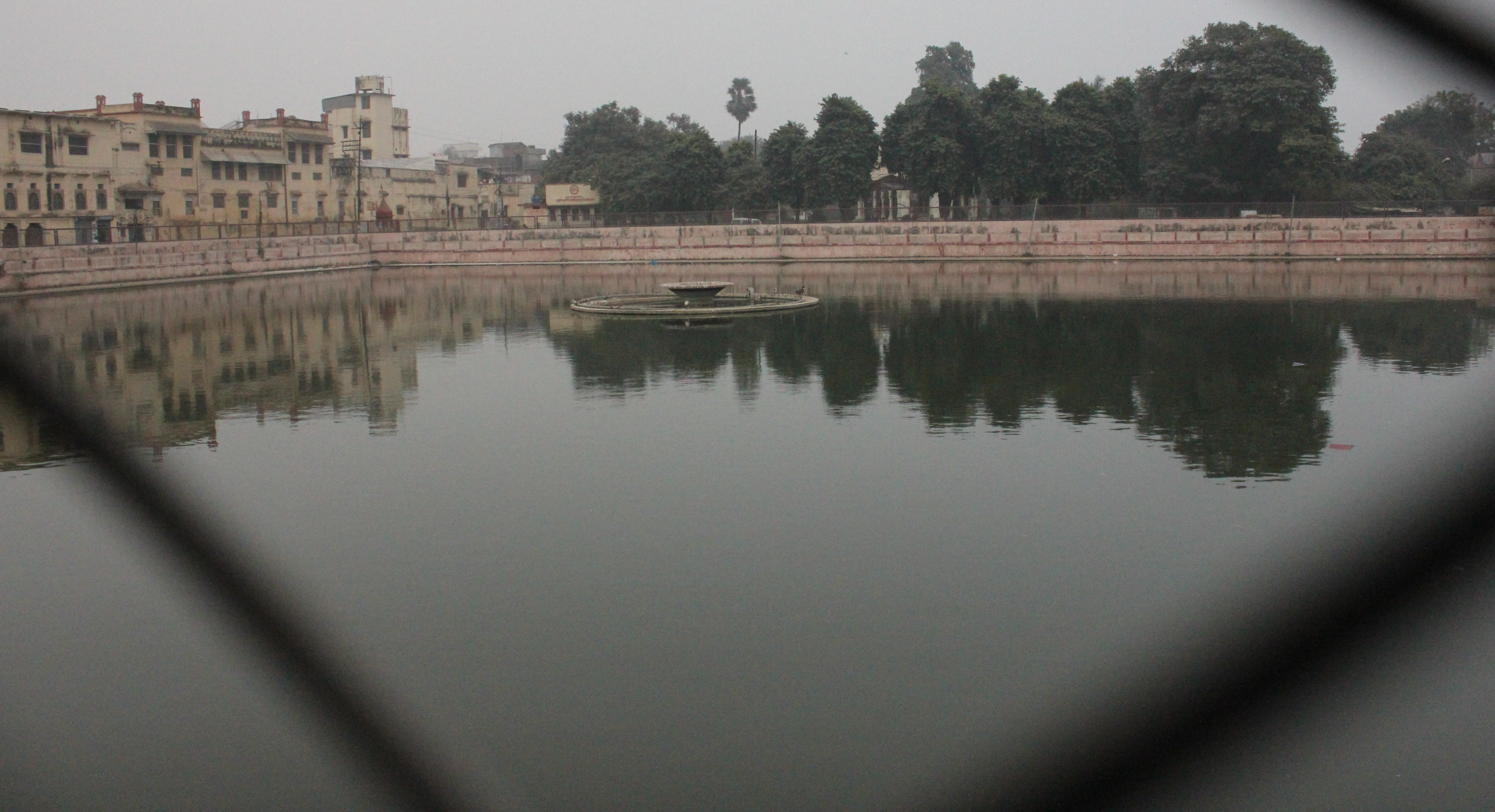
Durga Kund (pond) next to the temple

== Location ==
Durga Mandir is situated on the Sankat Mochan road, adjacent to Durga Kund, 250 meters north of Tulsi Manas Mandir, 700 meters north-east of Sankat Mochan Mandir and 1.3 kilometers north of Banaras Hindu University.

== See also ==
- Hindu temples in Varanasi
