= Gyanvapi Mosque =

Mosque and former Hindu temple in Varanasi, Uttar Pradesh, India

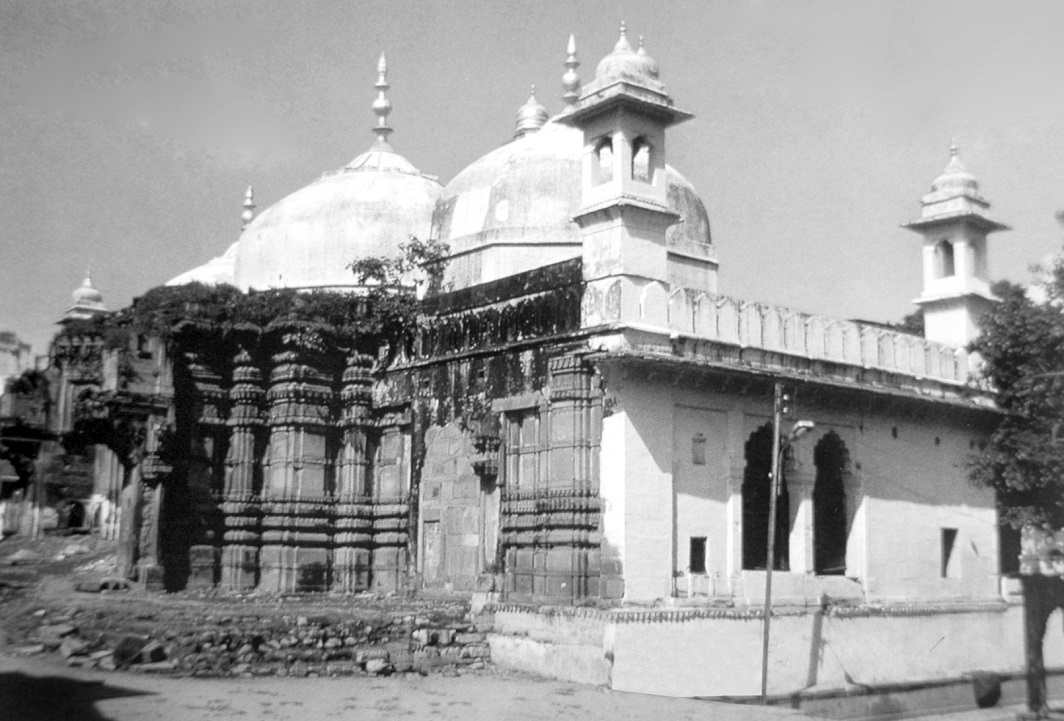
- The Gyanvapi Mosque

- Location of the mosque in Uttar Pradesh

Religion
- Affiliation: Islam
- Ecclesiastical or organisational status: Mosque
- Status: Active; Under Court case in the Honourable Supreme Court of India

Location
- Location: Varanasi, Uttar Pradesh
- Country: India
- Coordinates: 25°18′40″N 83°00′38″E

Architecture
- Type: Mosque architecture
- Style: Mughal

Specifications
- Dome: Three
- Minaret: Two

The Gyanvapi Mosque is a mosque located in Varanasi, in the state of Uttar Pradesh, India. The site was originally an ancient Hindu temple of Shiva or "Kashi Vishveshwara", one of the twelve sacred Jyotirlingas. The mosque was constructed in c. 1678 CE during the reign of the Muslim Mughal Emperor Aurangzeb, a decade after he issued a royal decree (firman) in 1669 ordering the destruction of the ancient Hindu temple.

A comprehensive ASI survey found that the mosque was constructed on the remains of a pre-existing large Hindu temple. The present structure incorporates architectural components of the previous temple, with visible Hindu motifs and sculptures on its pillars. However, both Hindus and the Muslims claim the right to the land, and ownership is currently disputed.

== Vishweshwar temple ==
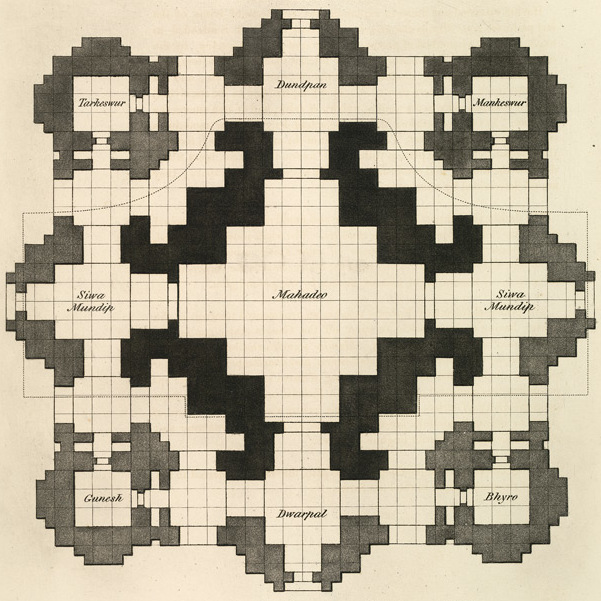
A conjectural reconstruction of the temple-plan by James Princep based on remnants and oral evidence of local Brahmins who probably derived from the Kashikhand. The dotted line traces the compound of the Gyanvapi mosque. Desai finds the presence of mandapas suspect, as accounts of contemporaneous pilgrims did not mention of them;

The site originally had a Vishweshwar temple devoted to the Hindu deity Shiva. It was built by Todar Mal, a premier courtier and minister of Akbar, in conjunction with Narayana Bhatta, a pre-eminent Brahmin scholar of Banaras from Maharashtra, during the late 16th century.

The temple contributed to the establishment of Banaras as a vaunted center of Brahminic assembly, drawing scholars across the subcontinent esp. Maharashtra, for adjudicating a spectrum of disputes concerned with Hindu religious law. (Note: Bhattadinakara, a roughly contemporaneous commentary by his grandson attributed the construction of the temple to Narayana Bhatta.) Architectural historian Madhuri Desai hypothesizes that the temple was a system of intersecting iwans —a borrowing from Mughal architecture— with prominent pointed arches; it had a carved stone exterior.

=== Pre-temple history ===
What was on the site prior to the temple is debated by scholars and has been extensively contested by the local Hindu and Muslim populations. Desai said these multiple histories of the original temple and tensions arising out of the location of Gyanvapi fundamentally shaped the sacred topography of the city.

==== Popular claims ====
21st-century accounts of the history of the mosque, as purveyed by Hindus, (Note: Pilgrims visiting the present Kashi Vishwanath Temple are informed with such a narrative. Local textbooks of the 1990s propagated such a reading of the mosque's past as well.) centre around a litany of repeated destruction and re-construction of the original temple which is situated in contrast to the timelessness of the lingam. The original temple was allegedly uprooted by Ghurids in 1193/1194 CE, upon the defeat of Jayachandra of Kannauj; the Razia Mosque was constructed in its place, a few years later. The temple would be rebuilt by a Gujarati merchant during the reign of Iltutmish (1211–1266 CE) at today's site — in what used to be Avimukteshwara's precincts — only to be demolished by Hussain Shah Sharqi (1447–1458) of the Jaunpur Sultanate or Sikandar Lodi (1489–1517) of the Delhi Sultanate. (Note: Miscellaneous raids and iconoclastic activities — undated and unattributed — are interpolated in between to explain how Avimukteshwara lost its prominence.)

==== Historicity ====
The earliest manuscripts of Skanda Purana (c. 810 CE) describe Banaras to be the kshetra of Avimukteshwar; there is no mention of Vishweshwar. The slightly later Matsya Purana, too, attests the supremacy of Avimukteshwar and does not mention Vishweshwar; however, certain corrupt manuscripts include it, suggesting a late interpolation. Krtyakalpataru, an encyclopedia of traditional Hindu law, written during the reign of Govindachandra (c. early 12th century) quoted a detailed description of Banaras — including an enumeration of all religious sanctuaries — from the Linga Purana; Kedareshwur was the only linga that was recorded to have been housed in a temple, Avimukteshwara was mentioned to be in the north of a sacred well, and of the two references to Vishweshwar, one is a literal reference to Shiva being the "Lord of the Universe" while the other is a linga. None of the extant Gahadavala inscriptions refer to a Vishveshwar shrine. Seals, excavated from Rajghat, mention Vishveshwar for the first time only in the first decade of the twelfth century; however, they soon become extremely abundant esp. as the Avimukteshwara seals, prevalent for centuries, die out.

Desai said it appears unlikely that there existed any prominent-enough Vishweshwar temple in Banaras, during the Ghurid raids (c. late-12th century) — or even during Razia Sultana's reign (fl. 1236) —, to have attracted particular attention in conflicts. She said that Hindu traditions were not timeless but fluid in time and space — they shared a dialogical relationship with popular practice as well as patronage. The Vishweshwar lingam received prominence only between the twelfth and fourteenth centuries with the Kashikhand (Note: A very late interpolation to the Skanda Purana, considered to be the most authoritative non-secular text on the conception of the city.) being the first text to attempt establishing Vishweshwar as the guardian deity of the city.

In contrast, Hans T. Bakker largely agrees with the popular narrative; he said the pre-history of the site is one of "[Muslim] bigotry and [Hindu] stubbornness". Bakker said that a temple, located at the current-day Gyanvapi precincts and devoted to Avimukteshwara, was indeed destroyed in 1194 CE; he cites Hasan Nizami's chronicling of wanton temple-demolition during Qutb ud-Din Aibak's raid on Banaras in support. At that time, Vishweshwar only occupied the adjacent hill-top that still bears an eponymous name. Soon Razia Sultana had a mosque constructed atop the hill-top forcing the Hindus to reclaim the vacant Gyanvapi site for a temple of Vishweshwar. This new temple of Vishweshwar was destroyed by the Jaunpur Sultanate to supply building materials for mosques at their new capital. Diana L. Eck agreed; other scholars have critiqued Eck's non-contextual usage of medieval sources. (Note: Dumper said Eck is a highly respected scholar on Sanskrit and Banaras but finds her history to be "extraordinarily confusing, moving from rhetorical storytelling to historical fact". Desai said Eck's account is parallel to Orientalist tracts of nineteenth century, where the "mythical antiquity" of Banaras blended seamlessly with "descriptions of the contemporary city".)

Beginning around the late-thirteenth century, a temple for Vishweshwar/Vishvanath finds mentions in both literary and inscriptional records — an inscription issued by Narasimha III in 1279 CE endowed the revenue of a village for payment toward taxes by the inhabitants of Banaras and for services at the Visvesvar Temple; an inscription from 1296, used as spolia in the Lal Darwaza Mosque, refers to a temple for Vishweshwar; and, Bhatta's Tristhalisetu (c. mid-16th century) mentions about how at times, "though there may be no Vishweshwar lingam due to mlechhas or other evil kings", yet pilgrimage must go on. Richard G. Salomon and others read this as a proof of the existence of a desecrated temple of unknown antiquity, before Todar Mal's construction.

For centuries, the Vishweshwar was one among the many sacred sites in the town; (Note: For centuries, 'nibandha' commentators sought to redefine the sacred space of Kashitirtha in terms of different temples notwithstanding the Kashikhand.) it would become the principal shrine of the city only after sustained patronage of Mughals, beginning from the late sixteenth century.

== Establishment ==
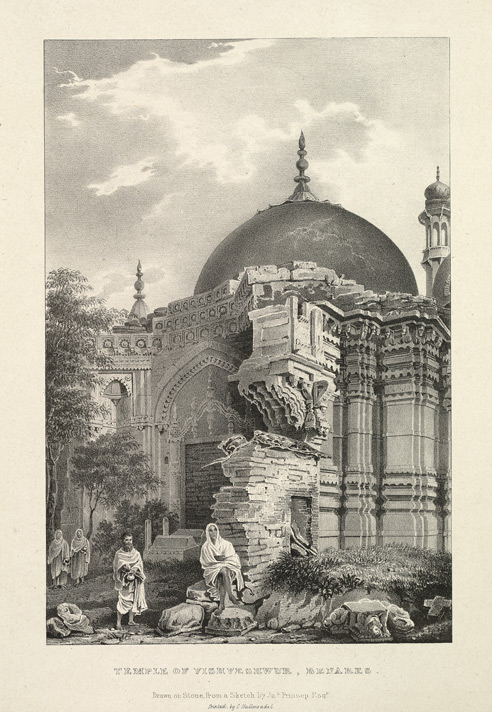
The semi-demolished wall of the temple, pillars, and ruins are visible in a sketch of the mosque by James Princep, 1834.

In September 1669, Aurangzeb ordered the demolition of the temple; (Note: Maasir-i-Alamgiri —a hagiographic account of Aurangzeb, penned after his death, by Saqi Mustaid Khan— records the demolition of the temple: It was reported that, according to the Emperor's [Aurangzeb] command, his officers had demolished the temple of Viswanath at Kashi. Among Khan's sources were the state archives; however, he did not provide citations. Khafi Khan, another contemporary biographer of Aurangzeb had said there was a lack of written sources for post-1667 events and hence, a need to depend on memory.) a mosque was constructed in place, perhaps by Aurangzeb, in c. 1678 CE. (Note: In 1207 AH (1792/1793 CE), on the occasion of the refurbishment of the mosque by a local Muslim noble, an inscription was installed. It claims the mosque to have been built in the 20th regnal year of Aurangzeb.) The façade was modeled partially on the Taj Mahal's entrance; the plinth of the temple was left largely untouched to serve as the courtyard of the mosque, and the southern wall — along with its cusped arches, exterior moldings and toranas — was turned into the qibla wall. Other buildings in the precinct were spared.

Oral accounts indicate that notwithstanding the desecration, Brahmin priests were allowed to reside in the premises of the mosque and exert their privileges on issues of Hindu pilgrimage. The remnants of the temple, especially the plinth, continued to remain a popular hub for Hindu pilgrims. The mosque came to be known as the Alamgiri Mosque — after the name of Aurangzeb — but with time, the current name was adopted in common parlance, deriving from an adjoining sacred waterbody — Gyan Vapi ("Well of Knowledge") — which, in all likelihood, even predated the temple. (Note: Legends hold that Shiva had dug it himself to cool the lingam.)

=== Motives ===
Scholars attribute political reasons rather than religious zealotry to be the primary motivation for Aurangzeb's demolition. Catherine Asher, a historian of Indo-Muslim architecture, notes that not only did the zamindars of Banaras frequently rebel against Aurangzeb but also the local Brahmins were oft accused of interfering with Islamic teaching. Consequently, she said that the demolition was a political message in that it served as a warning for the Zamindars and Hindu religious leaders, who wielded great influence in the city; Cynthia Talbot, Richard M. Eaton, Satish Chandra and Audrey Truschke agree on similar grounds. O' Hanlon highlights that the temple was demolished at a time when the conflict with Marathas was at its zenith.

In general, scholars emphasize upon how Aurangzeb granted protection and patronage to several temples, ghats, and maths, including in Banaras, both before and after the demolition. Ian Copland and others support Iqtidar Alam Khan who said Aurangzeb built more temples than he destroyed; they said that the religious politics of the Mughal emperors ought not to be viewed in light of their personal piety but in the sociopolitical contingencies of their times. The Oxford World History of Empire said that while the demolition of Gyanvapi might be interpreted as a sign of Aurangzeb's "orthodox inclinations", local politics played an influencing role and his policies towards Hindus and their places of worship were "varied and contradictory, rather than consistently agnostic."

=== Muslim counter-claims ===
Writing in 1993, Mary Searle Chatterjee said most local Muslims rejected the idea that Aurangzeb had the temple demolished out of religious zealotry. Theories included:

- The original building was a structure of the Din-i Ilahi faith which collapsed by itself or was destroyed by Aurangzeb, out of his hostility to Akbar's heretical thought-school.
- The original building was a temple but destroyed by a Hindu merchant from Jaunpur called Jnan Chand, as a consequence of the priests having looted, violated, and murdered one of his female relatives.

- A slight variant where it was Aurangzeb who destroyed the temple after the female relative of an accompanying officer suffered such fate. (Note: This is mentioned in Bhogaraju Pattabhi Sitaramayya's prison diary; he also said that one of his acquaintances had a contemporary manuscript in support of this narrative.)

- The original building was a temple but destroyed in a communal riot, triggered by local Hindus

- Ganj-e-Arsadi — a collection of the sayings of Arsad Badr-al-Haqq of Banaras, compiled in 1721 — notes Makhdum Shah Yasin to have demolished the "big temple" (assumed to be the Vishweshwar) in late 1669 in a communal melee as retribution against local Hindus who had engaged in the repetitive demolition of an under-construction mosque. Though opposed by the local administration in light of the associated imperial patronage, Aurangzeb did not condemn Yasin and expressed relief at the act.

- The original building was a temple and was destroyed by Aurangzeb but only because it had served as a hub of political rebellion.

More fringe claims include from the likes of Abdus Salam Nomani (d. 1987), the erstwhile Imam of the Gyanvapi mosque, who posited that the mosque was constructed much before Aurangzeb's reign; Shah Jahan had allegedly started a madrasah at the mosque in 1638–1639 CE. The mosque management committee, Anjuman Intezamia Masjid (AIM) supports Nomani and maintains that both the (new) Kashi Vishwanath Temple and the Gyanvapi mosque were constructed by Akbar, true to his spirit of religious tolerance.

Local Muslims emphatically reject that Aurangzeb had demolished any temple to commission the mosque. Nonetheless, there has been little engagement with these claims in historical scholarship; (Note: However, Mary Searle-Chatterjee notes of an eminent historian from Banaras Hindu University (G. D. Bhatnagar) to reject Aurangzeb's having destroyed a temple. Searle-Chatterjee herself refuses to discuss the historical validity of competing narratives, noting - "The historical issues are irrelevant, since it is clear that whatever the facts were, accounts of the origin of the central ruin are now functioning as symbolic narrative, providing a charter for contemporary attitudes and behavior.") Desai said Nomani's arguments were a strategic "rewriting of history" arising out of the Hindu-hegemonic nature of discourse in postcolonial Benaras.

== Late-Mughal India ==
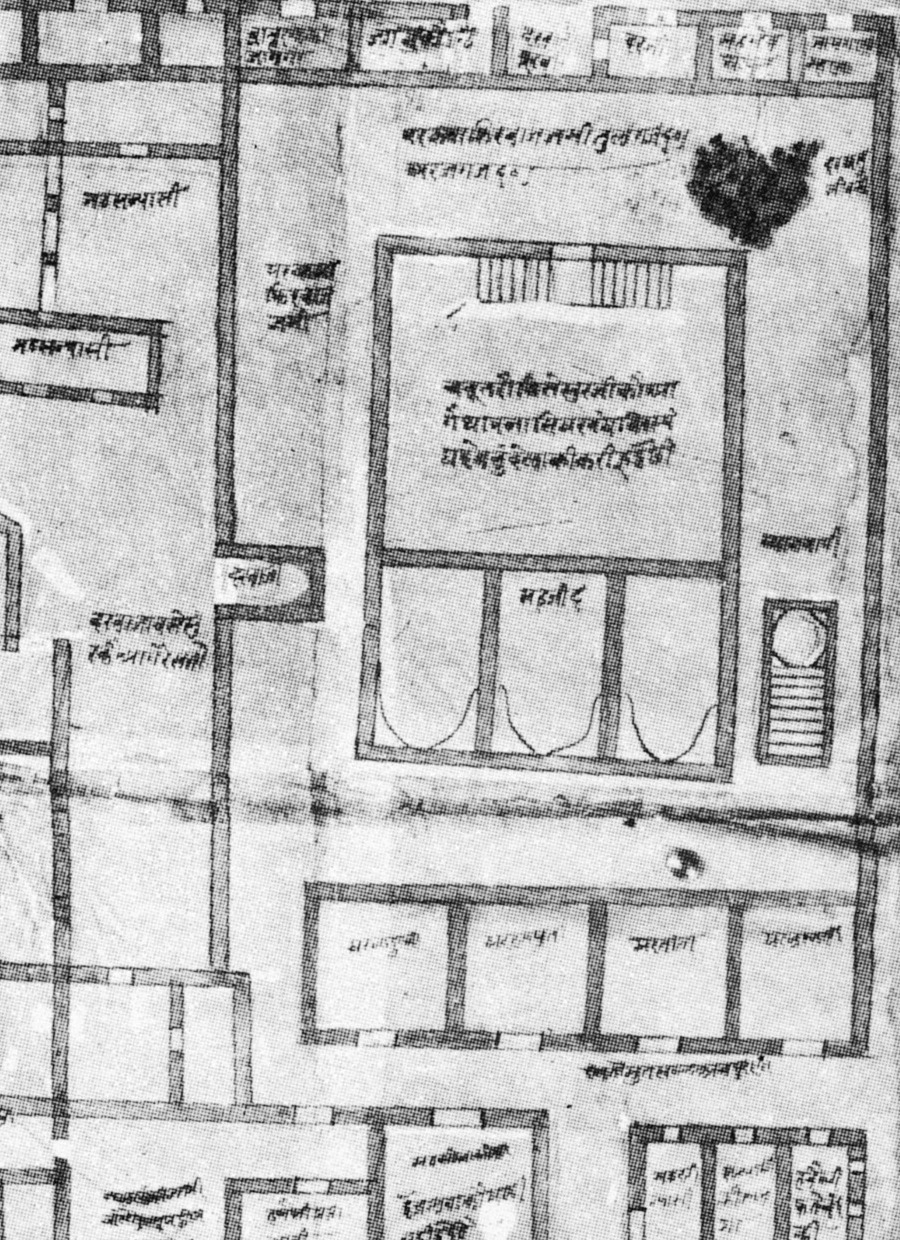
Bishan Singh's survey map (c. 1700). The three domed structure is marked as "masjid"; in the north, the plinth is demarcated separately as is the Gyanvapi well/pond on the East.

In 1678 the chief minister of the Malla ruler of Lalitpur constructed the Bhaideval temple (Note: Named so after the primary donor.) for Vishveshwara in the Patan Durbar Square — the inscription claims him to have transported Shiva from Banaras to Lalitpur since "he [Shiva] was dejected by terrible yavanas [Muslims]." (Note: The consecration of the temple was a grand affair with the royalty of Patan, Bhaktapur, Kathmandu, and Tanaha in attendance.) In 1698, Bishan Singh, the Kachhwaha ruler of Amber, had his agents survey the town — rather its ritual landscape — and gather details about the land-use patterns; their maps ('tarah') were explicit in holding the Gyanvapi mosque to lay at the site of the dismantled Vishweshwar temple. The temple-plinth and the Gyan Vapi well (pond) were demarcated separately from the mosque. (Note: These maps also noted the edges of the rectangular mosque-precinct to be lined up with the residences of Brahmin priests.) The Amber court went on to purchase significant land around the Gyanvapi precincts, including from Muslim inhabitants, with an aim to rebuild the temple — but without demolishing the mosque — yet failed. Eventually, an "Adi-Vishweshwar Temple" was constructed at the initiative of Bishan Singh's successor Sawai Jai Singh II, about 150 yards anterior to the mosque; the construction was borrowed from contemporary Mughal architecture — with Desai finding the typology to be more reminiscent of a Mughal tomb than temple — in what was a pointer to imperial patronage. (Note: C. 1720, Jai Singh had the walls of a room in his palace at Amber painted with "maps" of five holy towns — Mathura, Vrindavan, Ayodhya, Haridwar, and Banaras; in all probabilities, he intended to emulate a pilgrimage journey from the comforts of his palace and used to circumambulate the room daily. Differing significantly from contemporary historical reality, the murals portray an assertion of Hindu sensibilities divorced from the constraints of Mughal realpolitik; they exhibit ample creative liberty and are better characterized as a blend of realist and idealist representation, selective in their omissions and commissions. The Banaras mural does not feature the Gyanvapi Mosque just as the Mathura mural has the Keshava Deo temple standing notwithstanding its demolition by Aurangzeb, decades ago.)

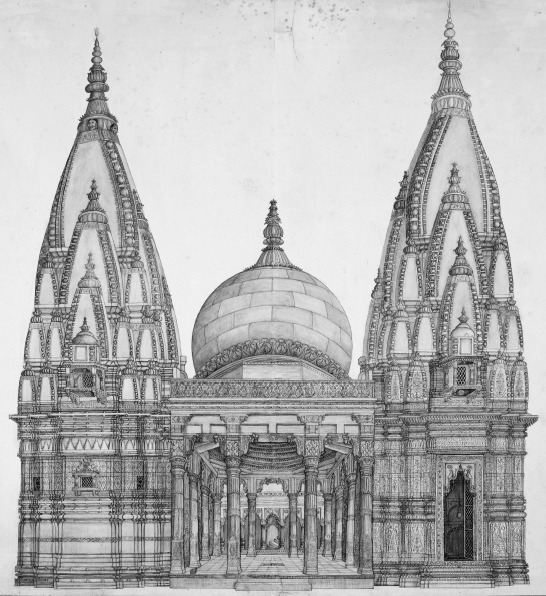
Elevation plan of the Kashi Vishwanath temple.

By the early 18th century, Banaras was under the effective control of the Nawabs of Lucknow; simultaneously, with the advent of the East India Company and their increasingly severe annexation policies, multiple rulers from across the country — and even administrative elites — started investing in Brahminising the cityscapes of Banaras, to claim cultural authority back in their homelands. The Marathas, in particular, became highly vocal about religious injustice at the hands of Aurangzeb and Nana Fadnavis proposed demolishing the mosque and reconstructing a Vishweshwar temple. In 1742, Malhar Rao Holkar proposed a similar course of action. Despite such consistent efforts, these plans did not materialize due to a multitude of interventions — the Nawabs who were their political rivals, local Brahmins who feared the wrath of the Mughal court, and British authorities who feared an outbreak of communal tensions.

In the late eighteenth century, as East India Company gained direct control of Banaras ousting the Nawabs, Malhar Rao's successor Ahilyabai Holkar constructed the present Kashi Vishwanath Temple to the immediate south of the mosque — this, however, had a markedly different spatial configuration and was ritually inconsistent. (Note: The precise year of construction is not known. It already existed by 1781, when Warren Hastings commissioned the construction of a gateway.) Compounded with the belief that the original lingam was hidden by the priests inside the Gyan Vapi during Aurangzeb's raid, the plinth would attract greater devotion than the temple for well over a century.

== British Raj ==
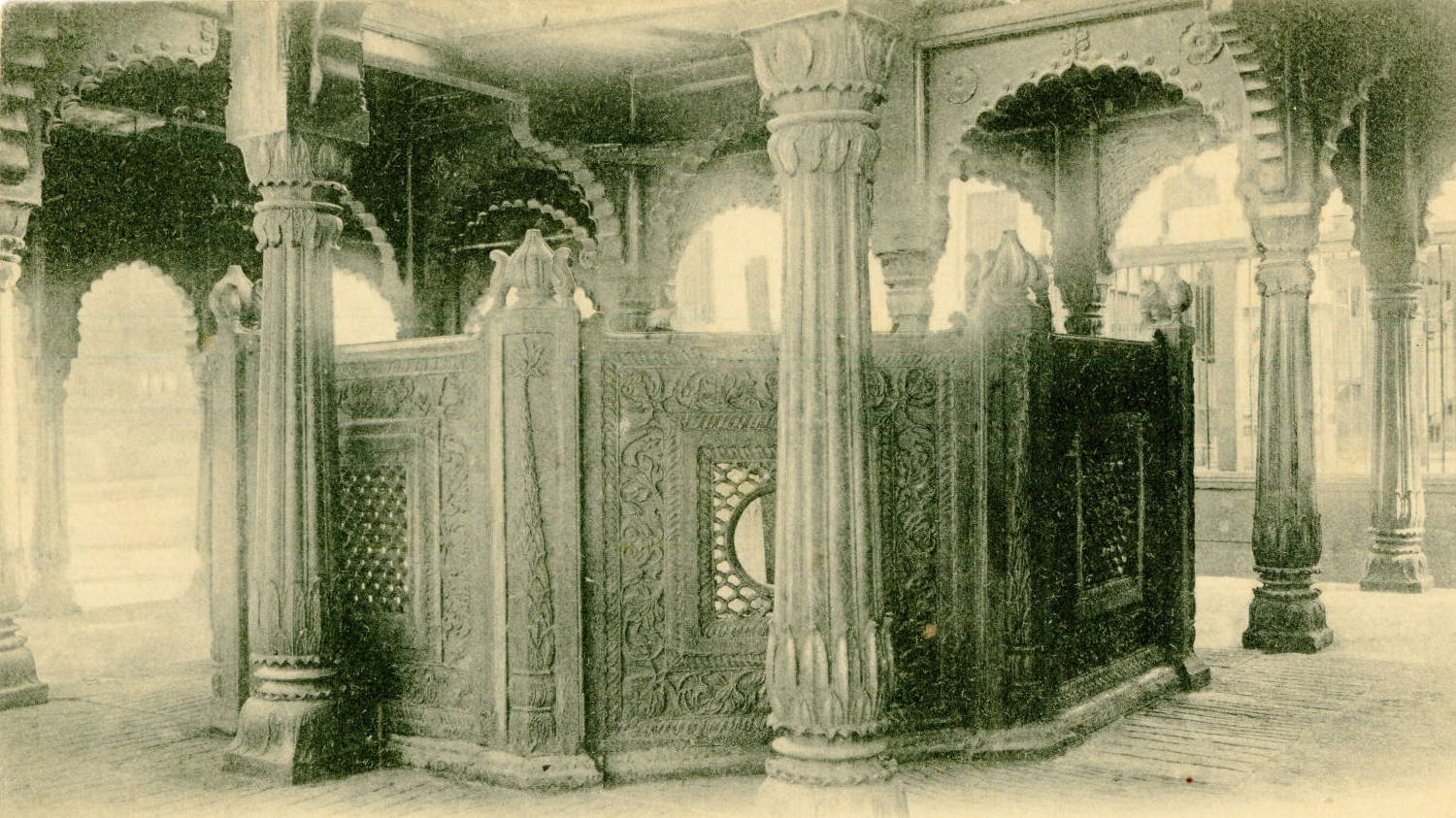
Rear-view of the well as depicted in a British India postcard c. 1900. The hexagonal screen had been installed by the local municipality to prevent devotees from dying of ritualistic suicide.

Under British Raj, the Gyanvapi, which was once the subject of whimsical Mughal politics, got transformed into a site of perennial contestation between local Hindus and Muslims spawning numerous legal suits and even, riots. A new generation of aristocrats and well-to-do traders took over the role exclusively played by petty rulers in late-Mughal India in controlling the ritual life of the city, most often under the guise of urbanization. Desai said the construction of mosque had sought to air an "explicitly political and visual" assertion about the Mughal command over the city's religious sphere but instead, "transmuted Vishweshwur into the undisputed fulcrum of the city's ritual landscape".

In October 1809, a riot broke between the Hindus and the Muslims out of a disputed construction at the Laat Bhairav site on the outskirts of the city. The day after, the riot spread across the city proper — a Muslim mob destroyed the Laat and proceeded to attempt demolishing the Kashi Vishwanath Temple; in turn, a Hindu mob, composed mostly of Gosains, burnt the Gyanvapi Mosque, massacred the Muslims sheltering within, and then, attempted to demolish it. Several deaths, mostly of Muslims, were reported and property damage ran into lacs, before the British administration quelled the riot. Widely believed to be first significant riot in N. India under Company rule, this hastened the growth of competitive communalism in Banaras. In memorials submitted to the government, about a year after the riot, the Hindus had accused Aurangzeb of being a bigoted ruler who had wrested Vishweshwar — among other temples — from them and pleaded for its restoration; the Muslims, in turn, accused the Hindus of having a perennial habit of claiming random mosques as Hindu shrines and asserted that the Gyan Vapi pond had only began to be worshipped from around twenty years before.

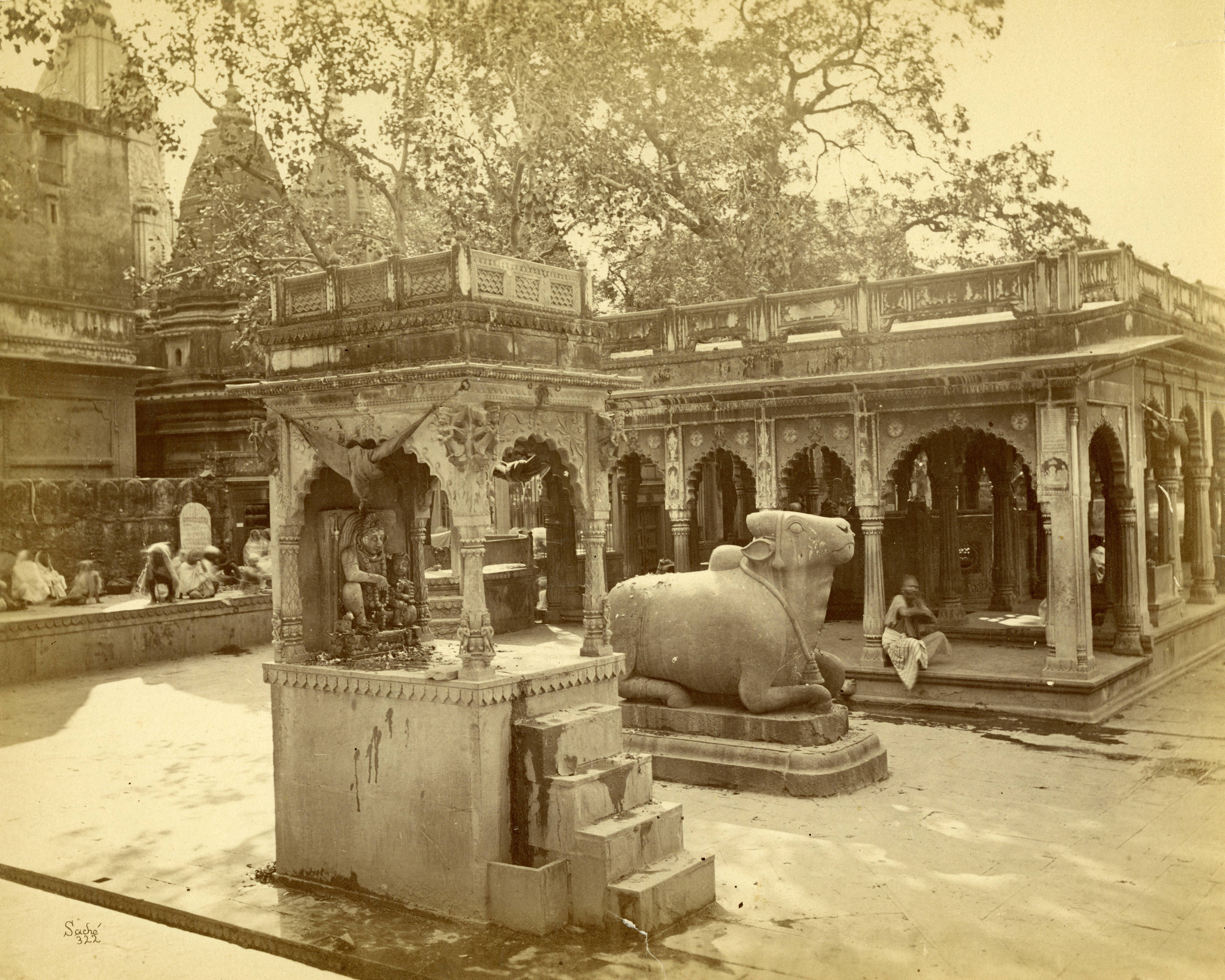
Gyan Vapi Precincts c. 1870s. Foreground (left to right): a small staired shrine of Shiva, a statue of Nandi facing the mosque (not in picture), and a colonnaded enclosure housing the well. Background: Spires of Kashi Vishwanath Temple.

Visiting in September 1824, Reginald Heber found the plinth to be more revered than Ahilyabai's temple and filled with priests and devotees; the "well", fed by a subterranean channel of the Ganges, featured a stair for the devotees to descent and take a bath. Four years later, Baiza Bai, widow of the Maratha ruler Daulat Rao Scindhia, constructed a pavilion around the well — reducing it in size —, and erected a colonnade to support a roof, pursuant to a proposal raised by member of a Peshwa family. The colonnade was based on the Gyan Mandapa, mentioned in Kashikhand but the architectural style was borrowed from contemporary Mughal Baradaris. (Note: Lazeratti notes, from conservations with Vyas family, that Muslims were subsequently prevented from accessing the water for purposes of wudu etc. The current wudukhana appears to have been constructed sometime hence.) To its east, was installed a statue of Nandi, which had been gifted by the Rana of Nepal. To further east, a temple of Mahadeva was constructed by the Rani of Hyderabad. In the south, two small shrines —one of marble, and the other of stone— existed.

The first legal dispute seem to have arose in 1843, when the priest of the Gyan Vapi well approached the local court about two attendants of the mosque who had been constructing a house in the temple precincts in violation of longstanding government orders that disallowed any unilateral modification of the site; the Court ordered in her favor and had the house demolished. Soon, legal disputes became frequent — in 1852, a dispute arose concerning the rights of cutting of a tree in a compound; two years later, a plea to install a new Nandi idol in the complex was rejected; etc. (Note: A similar dispute reached the Court in 1858, but this time, it was allowed on the condition that it replaces an old broken idol.) — and hostilities grew. In 1854, a Bengali pilgrim noted that Muslim guards were to be "either bribed or hoodwinked" to access the precincts.

M. A. Sherring, (Note: An amateur archaeologist, Sherring took to establishing Benaras as a Buddhist city of yore that had fallen to Brahminism, before felling to Muslims. He noted the presence of "Buddhist pillars" within the Gyanvapi Mosque, too. Such an assertion was thought to be a potent antidote to the fashioning of Benaras as an ageless site of pilgrimage for Hindus, which hindered Missionaries' efforts in converting natives. Also, if Buddhism could fell to Hinduism after centuries of glory, so would Hinduism to Christianity.) writing in 1868, said the Hindus had claimed the plinth as well as the southern wall; the Muslims were allowed to exert control over the mosque but quite reluctantly, and permitted to only use the side entrance. (Note: Local Muslims had once built a gateway in the middle of the platform in front of the mosque, but were not allowed to use it amidst severe Hindu discontent.) A peepal tree overhanging the gateway was also venerated, and Muslims were not allowed to "pluck a single leaf from it." In 1886, adjudicating on a dispute about illegal constructions, the District Magistrate held that unlike the mosque proper, which had belonged to the Muslims exclusively, the enclosure was a common space thereby precluding any unilateral and innovative use. This principle would continue to decide multiple cases in the next few decades. (Note: In 1887, an application by two local Muslims to open a shop at the complex perimeter was rejected; in 1889, construction of a stone bench was allowed since it could not have been an inconvenience or a favour to either community; in 1898, Muslims were disallowed from stacking construction material in the enclosure since it hindered pedestrians; in 1904, a trough feeder for cows and a wall — constructed by Hindus— were demolished since it was too large; in 1906, permission to rebuild the wall and install a new idol was rejected; in 1909, the municipality was allowed to pave a part of the enclosure.) Edwin Greaves, visiting the site in 1909, found that the mosque was "not greatly used", and remained an "eyesore" to the Hindus. His description of the pavilion paralleled Sherring's; the well commanded significant devotion too — however, pilgrims were not allowed direct access and instead, had to received its sacred water from a priest, who sat on an adjoining stone-screen. In the meanwhile, legal disputes continued unabated. (Note: In 1921, a plinth was allowed to be constructed for the Peepal tree; in 1923, Muslims were prohibited from storing poultry in the enclosure; in 1924, Muslims were ordered to remove a temporary barricade; in 1925, Hindus constructed a shed over the ablution tank of their own cost to prevent bird-droppings from the peepal tree contaminating the ablution tank, as a compromise, after having refused to cut any branch.)

In 1929 and 1930, the cleric of Gyanvapi was cautioned into not letting the crowd overflow into the enclosure on the occasion of Jumu'atul-Wida, lest Hindu pilgrims face inconvenience. Subsequently, in January 1935, upon such an occurrence, the city magistrate came down with his men and ordered the worshippers to vacate the site; days later, the mosque committee unsuccessfully demanded before the District Magistrate that the restriction on crowd-overflow be waived. It was also demanded, unsuccessfully, that Muslims be allowed to offer prayers anywhere in the complex. In December 1935, local Muslims attacked the Police after being prevented from offering prayers outside of the mosque proper, injuring several officials. This gave way to a lawsuit urging that the entire complex be treated as an integral part of the mosque — a waqf property — by customary rights, if not by legal rights; the contention was rejected by the lower Court in August 1937 (Note: Nonetheless, the Court held the mosque and the plinth to be undisputed waqf property.) and an appeal was dismissed by the Allahabad High Court with costs, in 1941. (Note: The High Court held that not only did the formation of enclosure post-date the mosque but also the enclosure was never in continuous possession of the Muslims (alone) for at-least the last hundred years. Thus, the plaintiff failed to establish any legal right. Further, recorded history of overflows into the enclosure went back to a few years, at most, and only on the occasion of a festive day. Thus, it was insufficient to give rise to customary rights.)

== Independent India ==
In March 1959, Hindu Mahasabha conducted a Rudrabhishek ceremony at the mosque pavilion on the occasion of Maha Shivaratri. Two of their workers were subsequently sentenced to six months of imprisonment for violating law and order. This spurred fellow Mahasabha-ites to mount routine agitations at the mosque pavilion across the next few months, demanding the restoration of the temple; by July, two hundred and ninety one "satyagrahis" spread across twenty three batches had courted arrest and served imprisonments of varying duration. In November, the annual meeting of RSS adopted a resolution to similar effects.

The site continues to remain volatile — Dumper finds it to be the "focus of religious tension" in the town. Access to the mosque remains prohibited for non-Muslims, photography is prohibited, the approaching alleys have light police-pickets (alongside RAF units), the walls are fenced with barbed wire, and a watchtower exists too. The mosque is neither well-used nor embedded enough in the cultural life of the city. On the eve of the 2004 Indian general election, a BBC report noted over a thousand policemen to have been deployed around the site.

=== Litigation ===
From 1984, the Vishva Hindu Parishad (VHP) and other elements of the Hindu nationalist Sangh Parivar engaged in a nation-wide campaign to reclaim mosques which were constructed by demolishing Hindu temples. The Gyanvapi mosque was prominently included among them. In 1991, a title-dispute suit (Note: Suit 610 of 1991.) was filed by three local Hindus in the Varanasi Civil Court on behalf of three Hindu deities — Shiva, Shringar Gauri, and Ganesha — for handing over the entire site to Hindu community to facilitate the reconstruction of temple; (Note: Further, it was claimed that the swayambhu lingam had existed in the compound for over a millennia —since the reign of one Vikramaditya— notwithstanding the superficial demolition of the temple by Aurangzeb and currently, Hindus were deprived of their religious right to offer water to the lingam.) AIM, acting as one of the defendants, said that the petition contravened the Places of Worship (Special Provisions) Act (henceforth PoW), which had expressly prohibited courts from entertaining any litigation that sought to convert places of worship. Nonetheless, AIM contested the idea that Aurangzeb had demolished any temple to construct the mosque. In the meanwhile, tensions increased in the wake of the demolition of the Babri mosque in December 1992, (Note: The Ayodhya dispute was stated as an exception to the PoW Act.) even though the Bharatiya Janata Party leaders, including those who had supported the demand for reclaiming Babri mosque, opposed the VHP's demand for the Gyanvapi Mosque since it was actively used. (Note: In an interview to Times of India on 15 July 1994, BJP supremo L. K. Advani said that the "Gyanvapi Mosque dispute is not on the BJP agenda." The TOI editorial said this fits the characteristic Jeckyl and Hyde behavior of Sangh Parivar organizations. On 2 April 1995, Atal Behari Bajpeyee said that Gyanvapi Mosque was actively used by Muslims and hence, BJP cannot support VHP's efforts.) Further, VHP leaders issued multiple calls across the mid-90s for Hindus to congregate in large numbers on the occasion of Maha Shivaratri and worship the Shringar Gauri image at the southern wall; public response was poor and no fracas occurred due to a proactive state administration. (Note: VHP had planned to conduct a parikrama of 18 temples around the Gyanvapi, every Shravan monday. The plan was dropped due to low public response.)

Hearings began in the civil court in June 1997. Four months later, the suit was held to be summarily barred by the PoW act. Three revision petitions were filed before the district court, by both the plaintiff and the defendants on disparate grounds, (Note: Rev No. 281 by defendant Uttar Pradesh Sunni Central Waqf Board, Rev. No. 285 by defendant AIM, and Rev. No. 286 by the plaintiffs.) which were merged and the civil court was ordered to adjudicate the dispute, afresh, after considering all evidence. The mosque management committee successfully challenged this allowance in the Allahabad High Court, who passed an order in October 1998, staying the proceedings. After a limbo of 22 years, the Civil court recommenced proceedings after petitioners cited a SCI judgement from 2018 which had held judicial stays to have a lifetime of six months unless explicitly extended; accordingly, the petitioners requested for an ASI survey to discover evidence in their favor. AIM petitioned against the very recommencement of trial before the High Court, who granted a fresh stay and reserved judgement on the merits of whether holding such a trial would be barred by the PoW Act. Nonetheless, the request for survey was granted in April 2021 and a five-member committee of archaeologists — with two members from the Muslim community — was constituted to determine whether any temple existed at the site, prior to the mosque. AIM opposed such a survey and moved before the High Court, who, in September, criticized the judgement for wanton breach of judicial decorum and issued an indefinite stay on the survey.

However, on 12 May 2022, the Civil court — adjudicating on a fresh plea by five Hindu women to worship the Shringar Gauri image at the southern wall — allowed a video-survey of the site. The survey went ahead notwithstanding local Muslim protests and accusations of bias by AIM. An object was discovered on draining the ablution pool which was alleged to be a shivling by the petitioners and the Court not only sealed-off the area but also restrained congregations of more than twenty mosque-goers at a time. AIM, claiming the object to be a medieval stone fountain, petitioned the Supreme Court of India for an indefinite stay of the survey and for vacating of all restrictions. However, the Court declined to grant full relief and only restored unfettered access to the mosque, before transferring the onus of deciding on merits to the District Court.

On 25 January 2024, the Archeological Survey of India presented its survey report to the court. It was determined that there existed a multi-chambered Hindu temple at the site prior to the construction of the mosque; most of the temple pillars were reused and they still had multiple votive inscriptions — in Devanagri, Kannada and Telugu scripts — featuring various names of Shiva. In addition, several sculptures of Hindu gods were found buried in the cellars. On 31 January 2024, the Civil Court allowed a Hindu petitioner to take possession of the cellar and initiate worship.

== See also ==
- Islam in India
- List of mosques in India
- Other notable mosques in Varanasi: Ganj-e-Shaheedan Mosque and Chaukhamba Mosque
- Conversion of non-Islamic places of worship into mosques
- Abdul Batin Nomani, Shahi Imam of Gyanvapi mosque

== Bibliography ==
- Desai, Madhuri (2003). "Mosques, Temples, and Orientalists: Hegemonic Imaginations in Banaras". Traditional Dwellings and Settlements Review. 15 (1): 23–37. JSTOR 41758028.
- Desai, Madhuri (2017). Banaras Reconstructed: Architecture and Sacred Space in a Hindu Holy City. University of Washington Press. ISBN 9780295741604. ISBN 9780295741611.
- Searle-Chatterjee, Mary (1993). "Religious division and the mythology of the past". In Hertel, Bradley R.; Humes, Cynthia Ann (eds.). Living Banaras: Hindu Religion in Cultural Context. SUNY Series in Hindu Studies. Albany, New York: SUNY Press. pp. 145–158. ISBN 9780791413319.
- Sherring, Matthew Atmore (1868). The Sacred City of the Hindus: An Account of Benares in Ancient and Modern Times. Trübner & co. pp. 51–56.
- Asher, Catherine B. (May 2020). "Making Sense of Temples and Tirthas: Rajput Construction Under Mughal Rule". The Medieval History Journal. 23 (1): 9–49. doi:10.1177/0971945820905289. ISSN 0971-9458.
- O'Hanlon, Rosalind (March 2011). "Speaking from Siva's temple: Banaras scholar households and the Brahman 'ecumene' of Mughal India". South Asian History and Culture. 2 (2): 264–265. doi:10.1080/19472498.2011.553496. ISSN 1947-2498. S2CID 145729224.
- Lazzaretti, Vera (2021b). "Demolitions, dream projects and the negotiation of Hinduness in Banaras". In Keul, István (ed.). Spaces of Religion in Urban South Asia. Routledge. pp. 90–91. doi:10.4324/9781003106067. hdl:10852/86847. ISBN 978-1-000-33141-7. S2CID 243380542.
- "Muslim Trouble in Benares: Police Force Stoned: Attempt to Pray Outside Mosque". Times of India. 20 December 1935.
- Lazzaretti, Vera (2021a). "Water And Conflicts Around Religious Heritage: Oscillations Between Centre And Periphery?". In Cortesi, Luisa; Joy, K. J. (eds.). Split Waters: The Idea of Water Conflicts. India: Routledge. doi:10.4324/9781003030171-9. ISBN 9780367466428. S2CID 236349990.
- Dutta, Prabhash K. (15 May 2022). "Gyanvapi: A 31-year dispute of 353-year-old shrine explained". The Times of India. Archived from the original on 17 May 2022.
- Greaves, Edwin (1909). Kashi the city illustrious, or Benares. Allahabad: Indian Press. pp. 80–82.
- Katju, Manjari (2003). Vishva Hindu Parishad and Indian Politics. Orient Blackswan. pp. 113–114. ISBN 978-81-250-2476-7.
- L. Eck, Diana (1982). Banaras: City of Light. Knopf. ISBN 978-0-307-83295-5.
- Askari, S. H. (1978). "Malfuzat: An Untapped Source of Social History — Ganj-i-Arshadi of the Jaunpur School — A Case Study". Khuda Bakhsh Library Journal. 7. Khuda Bakhsh Oriental Library: 1–22.
- Salaria, Shikha (19 May 2022). "Aibak, Akbar, Aurangzeb—the Gyanvapi divide & why a controversial mosque has a Sanskrit name". ThePrint.
- Lazzaretti, Vera (2021c). "Religious Offence Policed: Paradoxical Outcomes of Containment at the Centre of Banaras, and the 'Know-How' of Local Muslims". South Asia: Journal of South Asian Studies. 44 (3): 584–599. doi:10.1080/00856401.2021.1923760. ISSN 0085-6401. S2CID 236992467.
- Din Mohammad v. Secretary of State, Allahabad High Court, 1941
- Dumper, Michael (2020). "Hindu–Muslim Rivalries in Banaras: History and Myth as the Present". Power, Piety, and People: The Politics of Holy Cities in the Twenty-First Century. Columbia University Press. ISBN 978-0-231-54566-2.
- Shin, Heeryoon (2015). Building a "Modern" Temple Town: Architecture and Patronage in Banaras, 1750-1900 (PhD). Yale University.
- Askari, S. H. (2012) [2000]. "GANJ-E ARŠADĪ". Encyclopaedia Iranica Online. Brill. doi:10.1163/2330-4804_EIRO_COM_1891.
- Wink, André (2020). The making of the Indo-Islamic world : c. 700-1800 CE. Cambridge University Press. ISBN 978-1-108-41774-7.
- Taskin, Bismi (10 April 2021). "Decoding the Kashi Vishwanath-Gyanvapi dispute, and why Varanasi court has ordered ASI survey". ThePrint.
- Kumar, Sushil (27 April 2019). "How Modi's Kashi Vishwanath Corridor is laying the ground for another Babri incident". The Caravan.
- "Court Revives Dormant Dispute, asks ASI to Survey Gyanvapi Mosque Next to Kashi Vishwanath Temple". The Wire. 8 April 2021.
- Yamunan, Sruthisagar (10 April 2021). "Why UP court order asking ASI to survey Kashi-Gyanvapi mosque complex is legally unsound". Scroll.in.
- Yamunan, Sruthisagar (15 April 2021). "Analysis: Could ASI survey of Gyanvapi mosque lead to it being exempted from Places of Worship Act?". Scroll.in.
- Upadhyay, Sparsh (9 September 2021). "Gyanvapi Mosque Dispute: Allahabad High Court Stays Varanasi Court's ASI Survey Order & Other Proceedings". Live Law.
- Eaton, Richard M. (2000). "Temple Desecration and Indo-Muslim States". Journal of Islamic Studies. 11 (3): 306–307. doi:10.1093/jis/11.3.283. ISSN 0955-2340. JSTOR 26198197.
- Copland, Ian; Ian Mabbett; Asim Roy; Kate Brittlebank; Adam Bowles (2013). A History of State and Religion in India. Routledge. ISBN 978-1-136-45950-4.
- Menon, Kalyani Devaki (2002). "Living and Dying for Mother India: Hindu Nationalist Female Renouncers and Sacred Duty". In Mines, Diane P.; Lamb, Sarah (eds.). Everyday Life in South Asia. Indiana University Press. ISBN 9780253340801. JSTOR j.ctt16gz5rp.
- Truschke, Audrey (2017). Aurangzeb: The Life and Legacy of India's Most Controversial King. Stanford University Press. ISBN 978-1-5036-0259-5.
- Brown, Katherine Butler (2007). "Did Aurangzeb Ban Music? Questions for the Historiography of His Reign". Modern Asian Studies. 41 (1). Cambridge University Press: 77–120. doi:10.1017/S0026749X05002313. JSTOR 4132345. S2CID 145371208.
- Asher, Catherine B. (September 1992). Architecture of Mughal India. Cambridge University Press. ISBN 978-0-521-26728-1.
- Bakker, Hans (1996). "Construction and Reconstruction of Sacred Space in Vārāṇasī". Numen. 43 (1): 32–55. doi:10.1163/1568527962598368. ISSN 0029-5973. JSTOR 3270235.
- Eck, Diana L. (1982). Banaras: City of Light. Knopf. ISBN 978-0-307-83295-5.
- Gaenszle, Martin; Gengnagel, Jörg (2006). Visualizing Space in Banaras: Images, Maps, and the Practice of Representation. Isd. ISBN 978-3-447-05187-3.
- Pandey, Gyanendra (1989). "The Colonial Construction of 'Communalism': British Writings on Banaras in the Nineteenth Century". Subaltern Studies. Vol. VI. Delhi: Oxford University Press.
- Majumder, Sanjoy (25 March 2004). "Cracking India's Muslim vote". BBC News. Uttar Pradesh.
- Engineer, Asghar Ali (1997). "Communalism and Communal Violence, 1996". Economic and Political Weekly. 32 (7): 324. ISSN 0012-9976. JSTOR 4405088.
- Heber, Reginald (1829). Narrative of a journey through the upper provinces of India, from Calcutta to Bombay, 1824-1825. Philadelphia, Carey, Lea & Carey.
- Sarin, Jitendra (8 May 2017). "Allahabad HC to hear Vishwanath temple, Gyanvapi mosque dispute on May 10". Hindustan Times.
- Ahmed, Areeb Uddin (11 April 2021). "All you need to know about the Gyanvapi Mosque - Kashi Vishwanath Temple land dispute". Bar & Bench.
- Shrestha, Sahina (2 October 2021). "Restoring a piece of Nepal's history".
- Gaenszle, Martin; Sharma, Nutan Dhar (June 2002). "Nepali Kings and Kāśī: On the Changing Significance of a Sacred Centre". Studies in Nepali History and Society. 7 (1). Kathmandu, Nepal: 8. ISSN 1025-5109.
- Annual Report on Indian Epigraphy. Delhi: Archaeological Survey of India. 1967. p. 185.
- "Gyanvapi mosque dispute: Petitioners to move court against plea to remove survey officer". Scroll.in. 9 May 2022.
- "Gyanvapi mosque's survey will continue, says Varanasi court". Scroll.in. 12 May 2022.
- "Gyanvapi petitioners say shivling found in tank, mosque lawyer says it is a fountain". Scroll.in. 16 May 2022.
- "Gyanvapi mosque: Protect spot where claimed shivling was found, says SC but no bar on prayers". Scroll.in. 17 May 2022.
- "SC transfers Gyanvapi mosque case from trial court to district court". Scroll.in. 20 May 2022.
- Rashid, Omar (26 January 2024). "ASI's Survey Report Says a Large Hindu Temple Existed Under the Gyanvapi Mosque". The Wire.
- Mishra, Ishita (25 January 2024). "There existed a Hindu temple prior to construction of Gyanvapi mosque: Archaeological Survey of India". The Hindu.
- Rashid, Omar (31 January 2024). "A Day Before Retiring, Varanasi Judge Hands Over Gyanvapi Masjid Basement to Hindus For Worship". The Wire.
- Hawley, John Stratton (2024). "The Ideal Real Vṛndāvana of Jayasiṃha's Dining Room". In Okita, Kiyokazu; Lutjeharms, Rembert (eds.). The Building of Vṛndāvana. The Building of Vṛndāvana. BRILL. pp. 236–264. doi:10.1163/9789004686779_010. ISBN 978-90-04-68677-9.
- Sampath, Vikram (2024). Waiting for Shiva: Unearthing the Truth of Kashi's Gyan Vapi. BluOne Ink. ISBN 978-8196737597.
- Hawley, John Stratton (2012). "Hiding in Plain Sight: Gosains on the Ghats, 1809". In Dodson, Michael S. (ed.). Banaras: Urban Forms and Cultural Histories. The Building of Vṛndāvana. Routledge. pp. 236–264. doi:10.4324/9781003157793-6/hiding-plain-sight-william-pinch. ISBN 9781003157793.
- Udayakumar, S. P. (2005). Presenting the Past: Anxious History and Ancient Future in Hindutva India. Greenwood Publishing Group. ISBN 978-0-275-97209-7.
- Salomon, Richard G. (1985). The Bridge to the Three Holy Cities: The Sāmānyapraghaṭṭaka of Nārāyaṇa Bhaṭṭa's Tristhalīsetu. Delhi: Motilal Banarsidass.
- Chapple, Christopher Key; Tucker, Mary Evelyn (2000). Hinduism and Ecology: The Intersection of Earth, Sky, and Water. Harvard University Press. ISBN 978-0-945454-26-7.
- "Explained: Kashi Vishwanath in Sangh focus — first in 1959, but rarely thereafter". The Indian Express. 30 May 2022.
- Chojnacki, Christine (1995). Vividhatīrthakalpaḥ: Regards sur le lieu saint jaina. Institut Francais De Pondichery. doi:10.4000/books.ifp.5802. ISBN 9788184700701.
- Prasad, Pushpa (1990). Sanskrit inscriptions of Delhi Sultanate: 1191-1526. Oxford University Press. ISBN 0195621239.
