= Kāla-mādhava =

- Author: Madhavacharya
- Original title: काल-माधव
- Language: sa
- Subject: philosophy of time
- Publication date: c. 1336
- Publication place: Vijayanagara Empire

Kāla-mādhava is a c. 1336 CE Sanskrit-language treatise written by Madhavacharya alias Vidyaranya, in the Vijayanagara Empire of present-day India. The text aims to help the readers determine appropriate times for Hindu religious observances. It is also known as Kāla-nirṇaya ("determination or fixing of times") or Kāla-mādhavīya.

== Content ==
Madhava states that he composed Kāla-mādhava after writing a commentary on the dharma-śāstra text Parāśara-smṛti. According to him, the text aims to determine the time of performance of the dharma (duties) expounded in the Parāśara-smṛti. The text refers to several earlier writers and works, including Kala-darsha, Bhoja's work on the Shaiva agama, Muhurta-vidhana-sara, Vaṭeśvara-siddhānta, Vasishtha Ramayana, Siddhānta Shiromani, and Hemadri's Vrata-khanda and Dana-khanda.

The treatise includes a 129-verse introductory synopsis Kāla-nirnaya-kārikā. It contains five chapters (prakaranas):

1. Upodghata: discussion on time (kāla) and its nature
2. Vatsara: discussion on the periods of time:
  - year, including lengths of the year according to various calendars
  - solstices (āyāna)
  - seasons
  - months, including intercalary months and acts allowed/prohibited in these months
  - fortnights (paksha)
3. Pratipat: tithi (lunar day), duration of a tithi, types of tithis, rules for performances of religious rites and observances on the first tithi, muhūrta
4. Dvitiyaditithi: rules for the rest of the tithis (second to fifteenth), performance of vratas for each tithi,
5. Prakirnaka (miscellaneous): nakshatras for various acts, yoga (angular relationship between the Sun and the Moon), karana (half of a tithi), sankranti, eclipses

== Editions ==
- Chandrakant Tarkalankar, ed. (1885). Kālanirṇaya (Kālamādhava): being a treatise on the time proper for religious observances by Mādhavācārya. Calcutta: Baptist Mission Press.
- Kāla-mādhava, or Mādhavīya Kāla-nirṇaya (1876); published by Benares Sanskrit Press
- Kâlamâdhava, edited by Pandit Ratna Gopal Bhatta (1909), Chowkhamba Sanskrit Series
- Kala Madhav Karika (कालमाधवकारिका), with an introduction by Bhatta Vaidyanatha Suri (2014); published by Anandashram Sanstha, Pune

== Commentaries ==
- Nārāyaṇa Bhaṭṭa's commentary on introductory verses of Kalamadhava, 1540-1570 CE
- Kāla-mādhava-lakṣmī by Lakshmi-devi Payagunda (Lakṣmīdevī Pāyaguṇḍa), c. 18th century
- A vyākhyā by Umā, fl. 1400-1450; she belonged to the Mudgala gotra (clan), and was a resident of Kherada

Raghunandana (16th century) frequently quotes Kāla-mādhava.
