= Jamia Mazharul Uloom, Banaras =

Indian Islamic seminary

- جامعہ مظہر العلوم، بنارس
- Type: Islamic seminary
- Established: 1893; 133 years ago
- Founders: Hafiz Abdullah
- Rector: Independent Managing Committee
- Location: Varanasi, Uttar Pradesh, India
- Campus: Urban
- Language: Arabic, Urdu

Jamia Mazharul Uloom (جامعہ مظہر العلوم، بنارس) is an Islamic seminary located in Varanasi, Uttar Pradesh, India. It is one of the older religious institutions in the region and primarily provides instruction in Islamic sciences, including the Dars-e-Nizami curriculum, Hifz (Qur'an memorization), and the Arabic, Persian, and Urdu languages.

== History ==
Varanasi has historically been a renowned center of Islamic scholarship, producing numerous scholars, poets, mystics, and religious figures across generations. With the decline of individual educational households and private madrasas in the early 20th century, a growing need was felt for a permanent Islamic seminary in the city. This need culminated in the founding of Jamia Mazharul Uloom in 1893 (1310 AH), attributed to the efforts of Hafiz Abdullah, a devout and charitable Muslim artisan. He was known for dedicating his personal earnings toward mosque construction and religious education, and reportedly spent his inheritance of ₹5,000 entirely on building a mosque on the banks of the Ganges.

The seminary emerged in a city that had historically hosted prominent teachers such as Shah Raza Ali, Qutb of Benares; Hafiz Amanullah Husayni, a master of logic and philosophy; and early reformist educators associated with the Dars-e-Nizami curriculum. The founding of Jamia Mazharul Uloom was seen as a continuation of this tradition. According to a 1954 report, the seminary initially provided lodging and meals for 40 to 50 poor students, and gradually expanded to host over 250 students at a time.

By 1954, thousands of students had reportedly graduated from the seminary, including huffaz (Qur'an memorizers), Islamic scholars (ʿulama), and imams. Many served in various mosques and educational institutions across northern India and beyond. Notably, Shah Mun'ami, who later became Bihar's Minister of Public Works, was an alumnus of the seminary.

== Curriculum ==
The seminary offers religious education from the elementary level up to the Dawrah-e-Hadith (advanced study of hadith). Its curriculum includes:

1. Qur'anic studies
2. Dars-e-Nizami syllabus (including Islamic jurisprudence, logic, and theology)
3. Arabic, Urdu, and Persian languages

Annual examinations are conducted through both written and oral assessments, covering both religious and general subjects. Admission requires candidates to pass preliminary written and oral tests.

== Boarding and welfare ==
In 1954 (1374 AH), the seminary maintained a residential facility (darul-iqama) for full-time students. Out of approximately 150 enrolled students at that time, nearly 100 received free lodging and meals provided by the institution, while around 50 arranged their own accommodations. The seminary prioritized the needs of poor and orphaned students during that period.

Additionally, a dedicated orphanage (yateem khana) was established at the seminary in 1941 with the aim of combining religious education with structured care for orphaned children. In 1948, the foundation stone of a separate facility for the orphanage was laid by India’s then Governor-General, C. Rajagopalachari. According to the same 1954 report, community donations totaling around ₹19,000 were collected to construct a protective boundary wall around the acquired land.

As of 1954, twelve orphaned children were enrolled in the institution, and nearly fifty had graduated from the orphanage’s program over a span of about 13 years.

== Library ==
According to the 1954 report, the seminary's library contained approximately 2,500 books covering various branches of Islamic and general knowledge.

== Student organization ==
As of 1954, a student association named Anjuman al-Balagh actively organized weekly speech contests, scholarly debates, and religious events for student development.

== Notable features ==
- Teachers from various Islamic schools of thought have served at the institution.
- It has historically fostered an inclusive and non-sectarian educational environment.
- The seminary has produced numerous graduates who served in religious and community leadership roles across India.

== Funding ==
In the 1950s, the seminary was largely supported through donations from local benefactors. Its annual operating budget at that time was approximately ₹16,000, primarily sourced through local charitable contributions.

== Notable alumni ==
- Habibur Rahman Azami – Indian Hadith scholar
- Muhammad Ibrahim Banarsi – Former Mufti of Varanasi and Khateeb of Gyanvapi Mosque
- Shah Mun'ami – Former Minister of Public Works, Bihar
- Tahir Hussain Gayavi – Indian Islamic scholar
- Abdul Batin Nomani – Mufti of Varanasi and Imam of Gyanvapi Mosque
