= Gaga Bhatt =

Brahmin who crowned Shivaji

Pandit Gaga Bhatt
- विश्वेश्वर भट्ट
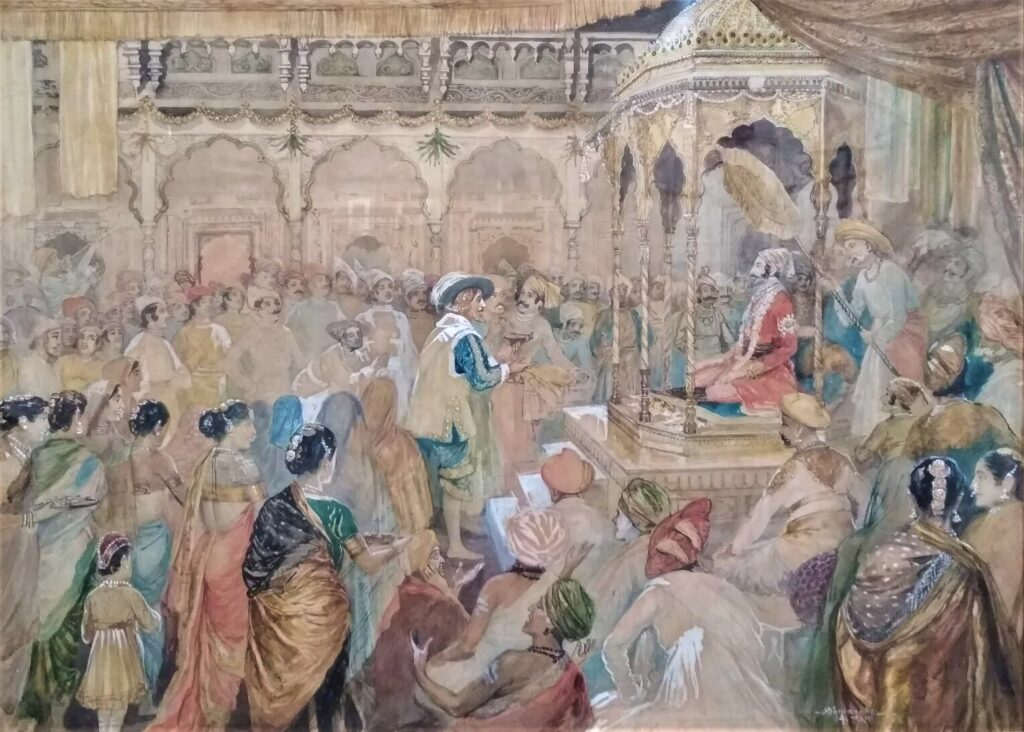
- Indrabhishek of Chatrapati Shivaji by Gaga Bhatt in the court.
- Title: Vedonarayana

Personal life
- Born: Vishveshwara Bhatt; 1600 Varanasi
- Died: 1685 (aged 84–85)
- Parent: Divakara Bhatt (father)
- Known for: Indrabhishek (or coronation) of Chatrapati Shivaji Maharaj

Religious life
- Religion: Hinduism
- Sect: Vaishnavism
- Dharma name: Paṇḍita Viśveśvara Bhaṭṭa

Vishweshwara Pandit (IAST: Viśveśvara Paṇḍita) (b. 1600 – d. 1685), popularly known as Gaga Bhatt (from Gāgābhaṭṭa), was a 17th-century Brahmin scholar from Varanasi, best known for presiding over the pan-Indian Brahminical committees convened by Chhatrapati Shivaji Maharaj to adjudicate the caste status of the Syenavi Gaud Saraswat Brahmins, who claimed Brahmin rank, and the Chandraseniya Kayastha Prabhus, who claimed to be Kshatriyas, before taking up the matter of Shivaji Maharaj's own caste and eligibility for investiture with the sacred thread (Upanayana), coronation as Chhatrapati (Abhisheka), and participation in other high rituals. Although there is some debate regarding Shivaji Maharaj to be of Kshatriya class, as some Historical records mention that near the time of the coronation, there was widespread opposition from Brahmins, who argued that only those born into the Kshatriya varna could be crowned as kings.

== Life and career ==
=== Early life and coronation ===
Gaga Bhatt was renowned as Vedonarayana ("greatest exponent of Vedic discourse"). The Bhatta family was Deshastha Rigvedi Brahmin (DRB) and originally hailed from Paithan, Maharashtra who belongs to Vishwamitra gotra. His great grandfather Nārāyaṇa Bhaṭṭa was a well-known scholar and his notable works on "smṛti" include, Prayogaratna, Tristhalisetu, Antyeșțipaddhati and Vṛttaratnāvalī. His grandfather was Rāmakṛṣṇa Bhaṭṭa, the eldest son of Nārāyaņa. His father Divākara Bhaṭṭa, the eldest son of Rāmakṛṣṇa was an author on smriti. His works include, Bhaṭṭadinākara, Śāntisāra and Dinākaroddyota. His uncle, Kamalākara Bhaṭṭa, was also a noted scholar, mostly known for his Nirņayasindhu, a popular work on smriti. Gaga Bhatt himself is known for his Bhāṭṭacintāmaṇi, a commentary on Jaimini's Purva Mīmāṃsā sūtras and the ensuing school of thought, Mīmāṃsā.

Gaga Bhatt's first reference appears in 1640 where is noted as a member of the assembly of Pandits in Kashi deciding upon the rights of a Shende Golak family. Gaga Bhatt has previously met Shivaji more than a decade before his coronation year of 1674. In 1663, he came to the Deccan. At Rajapur, Maharashtra Shivaji invited him to preside an assembly of 15 Pandits to decide on the rights of the Shenvi community and determine their status ie. whether they were Brahmins or Gowdas. The decision at this assembly in April 1664 is prefaced by praise or prashasti for Shahaji and Shivaji by Gaga Bhatt.

=== Coronation of Chhatrapati Shivaji Maharaj ===
Ganga Bhatt appeared without invitation in the chronicles of Sabhasad and Chitragupta, when he decided to visit his court after hearing about the fame of Shivaji. He was impressed with Shivaji's court and their treatment of him, quoting:

The forms of Kshatriya duty have been utterly extinguished during the Kali Yuga. The earth is overrun with Yavanas (Mahomedans) who have usurped the thrones of kings. No spark of valour is left in the warriors of the Solar or the Lunar race. Sacrifices are stopped; forms of duty forgotten; the Brahman Dharma eclipsed; the great shrines have lost their expiatory virtue. It is only you who have put forth great valour, defeated the Mahomedan sultans, quieted Aurangzeb, vanquished his pro-consuls, won a great kingdom, and maintained in your power a hundred thousand cavalry, three hundred and sixty forts, and great wealth and possessions. This being so, you are yet without a consecrated throne. It is, therefore, my wish and the wish of many other people of Swaraj to crown you king and have you saluted as a king of the royal umbrella by other rulers. Without a formal crowning a ruling king has no honour. By getting yourself formally crowned, you will complete the humiliation of Aurangzeb and the other sultans. Do you, therefore, indulge us in this our desire?

— Takakhav, N. S., The Life of Shivaji Maharaj p. 354

Gaga Bhatt presented a genealogy declaring that Shivaji's ancestors were Kshatriyas descended from the solar line of the Kshatriyas Ranas of Mewar. Shivaji had insisted on an Indrabhishek ritual, which had fallen into disuse since the 9th century. He was given the title Kshatriya Kulavantas Sinhasanadheeshwar Chhatrapati Shivaji Mahārāj by Gaga Bhatt. Shivaji's grandfather Maloji Bhonsle claimed descent from the Sisodia clan of Kshatriyas. According to this theory, Shivaji's original ancestors had migrated from Mewar to Deccan.Those Scholars who doubt Kshatriyas origin writes that some local Brahmins doubted his Kshatriya ancestry, but the prominent Pandit Gaga Bhatt of Varanasi presented a genealogy declaring that Shivaji's ancestors were Kshatriyas descended from the solar line of the Kshatriyas Ranas of Mewar. Allison Busch, Professor at the Columbia University states that Shivaji was not a Kshatriya as required and hence had to postpone the coronation until 1674 and hired Gaga Bhatt to trace his ancestry back to the Sisodias. While the preparations for the coronations were in process, Bhushan, a poet, wrote a poem about this genealogy claimed by Bhatt in "Shivraj Bhushan". Using this example, Busch shows how even poetry was an "important instrument of statecraft" at the time.

Scholars suggest that Pandit Gaga Bhatt was secured in charge of authoritatively declaring him a Kshatriya as Bhonsles being Marathas did not belong to Kshatriya nor any other upper caste but were mere tillers of soil as Shivaji's great-grandfather was remembered to have been. Bhatt was made compliant, and he accepted the Bhonsle pedigree as fabricated by the clever secretary Balaji Avji, and declared that Rajah was a Kshatriya, descended from the Maharanas of Udaipur. Bhatt was rewarded for the bogus genealogy with a huge fee. The Brahmin acknowledgement of Kshatriyahood is therefore taken as political. The passage from the Dutch records suggest the plausibility of this argument. The report of Shivaji's coronation in the contemporary Dutch East India Company archives indicates that Shivaji's claim was contested twice at the ceremony itself. Firstly the Brahmins did not want to grant him the status of Kshatriya and then they refused him the recitation of the Vedas, indicating Shivaji was admitted to the fold of the higher varnas as far as the sign of the sacred thread was concerned, but restricted in their use of the concomitant ritual rights including the recitation of the Vedas.

Historians such as Surendra Nath Sen and V. K. Rajwade reject the Sisodia origin by citing the temple inscription of Math, dated to 1397 and holds the view that the genealogy was forged by Shivaji's men.

Gaga Bhatt officially presided over the ceremony, and had a gold vessel filled with the seven sacred waters of the rivers Yamuna, Sindhu, Ganga, Godavari, Krishna and Kaveri. He held the vessel over Shivaji's head and chanted the coronation mantras, as the water kept dripping from the several tiny holes in the vessel. After the ablution, Shivaji bowed before Jijamata and touched her feet. Nearly fifty thousand people gathered at Raigad for the ceremonies. Shivaji was bestowed with the sacred thread jaanva, with the Vedas and was bathed in an abhisheka. He had insisted on an Indrabhishek ritual, which had fallen into disuse since the 9th century. Shivaji then had the title of "shakakarta" conferred upon him. He was bestowed with the Zaanva (or Janeu, the sacred thread), with the Vedas and was bathed in an abhisheka. Shivaji was formally crowned Chhatrapati ("Chhatrapati= Chief, head or King of Kshatriyas", representing the protection he bestowed on his people) on 6 June 1674 at the Raigad fort.
