= Indrabhisheka =

Historical Hindu ceremony

Indrabhisheka (Sanskrit: इन्द्राभिषेक, romanized: Indrābhiṣēka) was a ceremony performed by Indian kings that is mentioned in the Aitareya Brahmana.

== History ==
With the loss of political power to the Turushka Islamic hordes, and collapse of tradition, the indrabhisheka ceremony was relegated to the background. The Yadavas and Chauhans were the last dynasties to perform a coronation ritual, but whether they performed indrabhisheka ceremony is not clear. Chhatrapati Shivaji Maharaj, the founder of the Maratha Empire, revived the indrabhisheka tradition. Pandit Gaga Bhatt, who presided over his coronation ceremony, wrote a detailed book on the procedure. A thread ceremony, Upanayana, of Shivaji took place on May 29, 1674, and then a Vratyastoma ceremony was performed.
