= Nārāyaṇa Bhaṭṭa =

16th-century Indian scholar

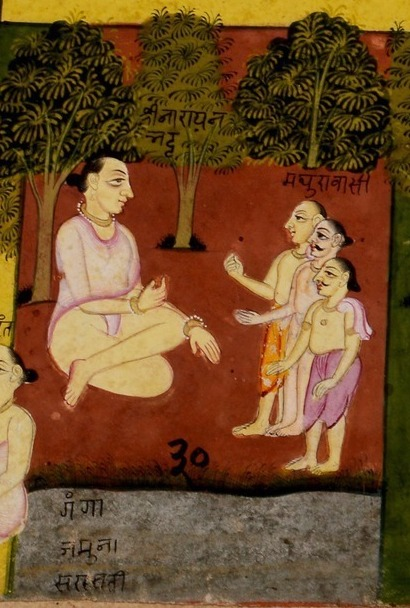
Sri Narayan Bhatt, Bhaktamal illustration, Bundelkhand, circa late 18th century

Nārāyaṇa Bhaṭṭa (c. March 1513 – ?) was a renowned scholar and author in the field of Dharmaśāstra, prosody, and Alaṅkāra, residing in Benares during the 16th century. He belonged to the Bhaṭṭa family, originally from Maharashtra, known for their dedication to the study and composition of Dharmaśāstra texts. Nārāyaṇa Bhaṭṭa's father, Rāmeśvara Bhaṭṭa, migrated from Pratiṣṭhāna in Deccan to Banaras.

It is believed that he played a role in rebuilding the famous Viśvanātha temple in Banaras, which had been repeatedly demolished by Muslim attackers in the past. (Note: However, this effort was short-lived, as the temple was once again demolished by Aurangzeb, who then constructed the Gyanvapi Mosque in 1678 on the site where the temple had stood.)

He is also the ancestor of authorities like Kamalākara Bhaṭṭa, Gāgā Bhaṭṭa, Dinakara Bhaṭṭa, and others.

== Works ==
Bhaṭṭa's notable works include a commentary on the Vṛttaratnākara of Kedāra Bhaṭṭa, Vṛttaratnāvalī, Prayogaratna, Tristhalisetu, and Antyeșțipaddhati. His work, Vṛttaratnāvalī, is mentioned in a report by F. Kielhorn. He also wrote a commentary on Madhavacharya's Kāla-mādhava.

Nārāyaṇa Bhaṭṭa's life and works provide valuable insights into the scholarly pursuits and cultural heritage of Benares during the 16th century.
