= Abdul Batin Nomani =

Indian mufti and writer

- عبد الباطن نعمانی
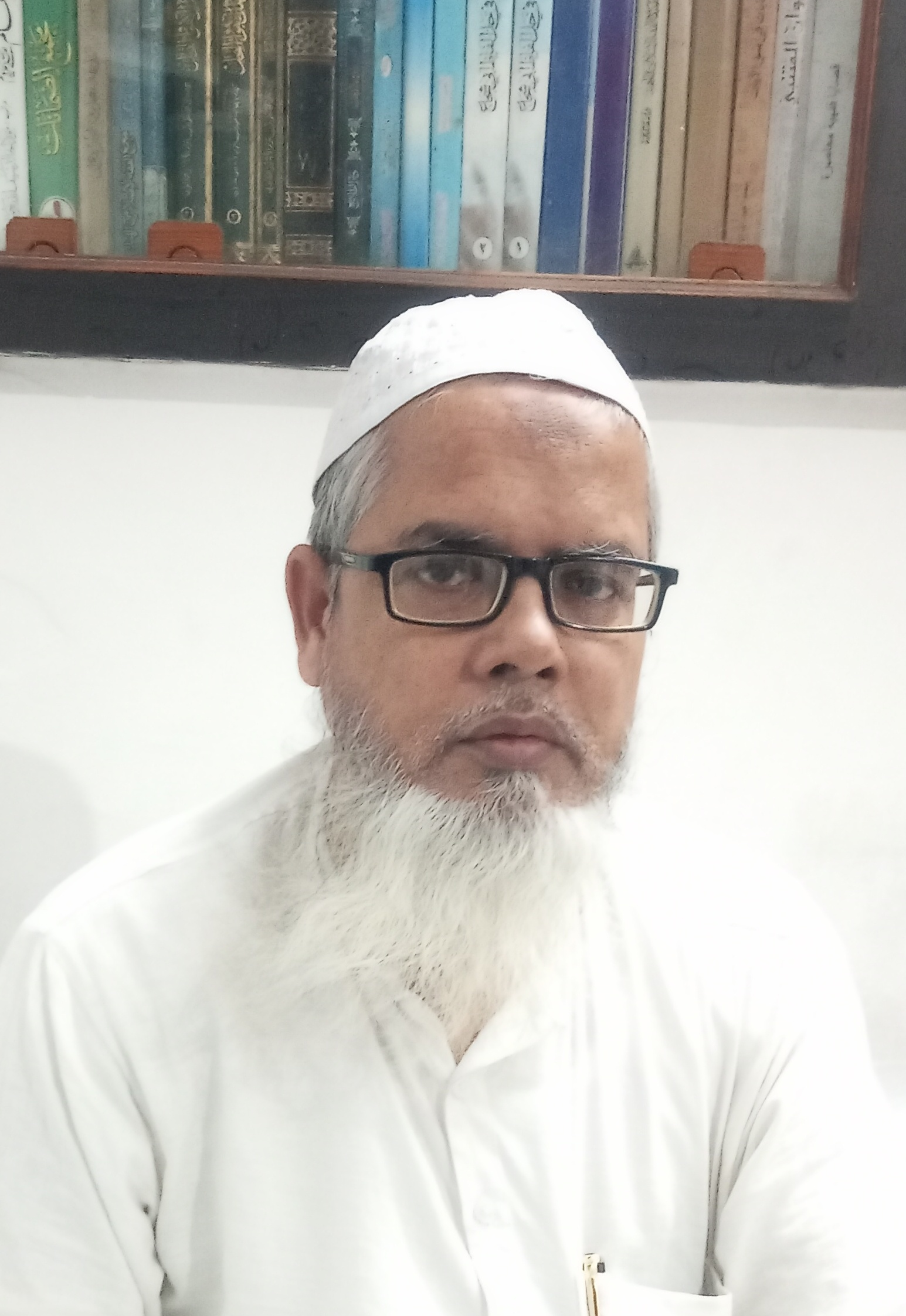
- Title: Mufti-e-Banaras, Shahi Imam of Gyanvapi Mosque

Personal life
- Born: 5 March 1973 (age 53) Varanasi, Uttar Pradesh, India
- Education: Jamia Mazharul Uloom, Varanasi
- Occupation: Islamic scholar, teacher, community leader

Religious life
- Religion: Islam
- Denomination: Sunni Islam
- Jurisprudence: Hanafi
- Creed: Maturidi
- Movement: Deobandi

Abdul Batin Nomani (born 5 March 1973) is an Indian Sunni Islamic scholar, mufti, and the current Shahi Imam of the Gyanvapi Mosque in Varanasi, Uttar Pradesh. He also serves as the Mufti of Varanasi and the secretary of the Anjuman Intezamia Masajid Committee, which manages the Gyanvapi Mosque complex.

== Early life and education ==
Abdul Batin Nomani was born in Azad Park, Pili Kothi area of Varanasi on 5 March 1973. He comes from a family with a long-standing tradition of religious scholarship. He began his Quranic education at home and later studied at Madrasa Mazharul Uloom, from where he graduated in 1993. He received advanced training in Hadith under scholars including Zainul Abideen Maaroofi and also passed the "Fazil" examination from the Madrasa Board.

== Career ==
Following his graduation, Nomani began teaching at Jamia Mazharul Uloom in Varanasi, where he continues to serve.

In 2002, he assumed the position of Shahi Imam of the Gyanvapi Mosque, a role previously held by his grandfather, father, and another member of his family. He also serves as the Mufti of Varanasi and the secretary of the Anjuman Intezamia Masajid Committee, which manages the Gyanvapi Mosque complex.

He heads the Darul Ifta and serves on the local Shariah arbitration board (Darul Qaza) in Varanasi. He is affiliated with various religious and community organizations, including the Jamiat Ulama-e-Hind (Banaras chapter).

== Gyanvapi Mosque Involvement ==
Nomani has been actively involved in the legal and religious issues surrounding the Gyanvapi Mosque. He has publicly stated that the mosque has been used for Muslim worship for centuries and is registered as a Sunni Waqf property since 1937.

In June 2022, he expressed concerns about increasing legal and societal pressure on mosques in India, citing the Gyanvapi case and other similar disputes.

In August 2024, Nomani led public protests against the installation of a temporary gate near Gate No. 4 of the Gyanvapi complex, alleging that it would hinder Muslim access to the mosque during Friday prayers.

In early February 2024, following a Varanasi district court order that permitted Hindu worship in the southern cellar (basement) of the Gyanvapi complex, Nomani and the Anjuman Intezamia Masajid Committee (AIMC) called for peaceful protest measures, including a bandh (shutdown) of shops in several Muslim-dominated localities on 2 February 2024; the AIMC said the action was in response to what it described as a "misleading claim" that puja had been performed in the southern cellar until 1993, which the committee denied. The AIMC reported that around 2,200 people offered Friday prayer at Gyanvapi on 2 February and that additional worshippers attended other mosques across the city; security was tightened and police patrolling (including drone deployment) was reported around the complex on that day to maintain peace and order.

Nomani publicly denied historical claims suggesting continuous Hindu worship in the southern cellar of the mosque, stating that such assertions were false and that there was no record of puja being performed there, and reiterating the AIMC's legal challenge to the district court's order in the higher courts.

In August 2024, after the Kashi Vishwanath (KV) temple security committee proposed and began installing a temporary iron gate near Gate No. 4 of the Gyanvapi complex for crowd and security management, Nomani and other AIMC office-bearers objected strongly, alleging the gate would obstruct Muslim access; the AIMC convened a meeting and resolved to write to several political leaders seeking intervention and to prepare legal options, while the district administration stated the installation was intended for crowd management and subsequently halted work after AIMC objections. Nomani warned of continued opposition — within legal and Gandhian limits — should attempts to restrict access recur, and AIMC leaders prepared both political outreach (letters to MPs and party leaders) and legal recourse to challenge such installations.

In July 2025, as the Uttar Pradesh government's Dalmandi Road widening project advanced (aimed at improving access to Gate 4 of the Kashi Vishwanath Dham), Nomani wrote an open letter to the President, the Prime Minister, the Chief Minister and opposition leaders seeking an alternative route to avoid demolition of six mosques and numerous shops and homes in the Dalmandi area; he argued that the project threatened livelihoods of thousands and communal harmony, and noted that affected mosque and property owners had obtained temporary stays from the High Court, pointing to legal complexities in the exercise of the project. The public letter and local political responses underscored Nomani's continued role in mobilising community concern and seeking political/legal remedies to infrastructure actions that affect mosque properties and local commerce.

At a conference in Kozhikode in February 2024, Nomani reiterated that, in his view and research, there is no historical record indicating that a temple stood on the exact site of the Gyanvapi Mosque; he suggested that claims about a temple at that precise spot were fabricated and that the area in question had been used historically for storing temple properties rather than as a site of puja.

== Public appeals and activism ==
In 2021, Nomani appealed to all mosque committees and imams across Uttar Pradesh to ensure that proper legal documentation of mosques was maintained, following the demolition of a mosque in Barabanki despite a court stay order.

Nomani has continued to combine legal action, political outreach and public appeals in response to developments affecting the Gyanvapi complex and neighbouring areas, including organising or endorsing peaceful protests, calling for community-wide measures such as selective shop closures in protest of court orders, and writing to political leaders to seek intervention when administrative actions (such as security installations or road-widening projects) are perceived to threaten mosque access or existence.

== Publications ==
Nomani is also active in Islamic research and has authored a historical account titled Jama Masjid Gyanvapi: Tareekh ke Aaine Mein (Gyanvapi Mosque in the Mirror of History). He has also contributed to the religious and cultural historiography of Varanasi by editing and annotating earlier works such as Asar-e-Banaras and Tazkira Mashaikh-e-Banaras. In addition, he has written instructional texts like Hajj ka Muallim.

== Recognition ==
Nomani has been recognized by several civil society groups for his contributions to interfaith dialogue and social issues. He was honored by the Institute of Planning and Management in 2006 following his efforts for peace during a communal crisis in Varanasi.

== See also ==
Gyanvapi Mosque
