= Vaṭeśvara =

10th century Indian astronomer

Vaṭeśvara (Sanskrit: वटेश्वर Sanskrit pronunciation: [vəʈeːɕvərə]) (born c. 880), was a tenth-century Indian mathematician from Kashmir who presented several trigonometric identities. He was the author (at the age of 24) of the Vaṭeśvara-siddhānta, written in 904 AD, a treatise focusing on astronomy and applied mathematics.The work criticized Brahmagupta and defended Aryabhatta I. An edition of the first three chapters was published in 1962 by R. S. Sharma and Mukund Mishra. Al Biruni referred to the works by Vateswara, particularly the Karaṇasāra, noting that the author was the son of Mihdatta who belonged to Nagarapura (also referred to as Anandapura, now named Vadnagar). The Karaṇasāra uses 821 Saka era (899 AD) as a reference year.

== Other sources ==
- K. V. Sarma (1997), "Vatesvara", Encyclopaedia of the History of Science, Technology, and Medicine in Non-Western Cultures edited by Helaine Selin, Springer, ISBN 978-0-7923-4066-9
