= Tahir Hussain Gayavi =

Indian Islamic scholar (1947–2023)

Maulana Tahir Hussain Gayavi

Personal life
- Born: 12 April 1947 Kābar, Konch, Gaya district, Bihar, British India
- Died: 10 July 2023 (aged 76) Arrah, Bhojpur district, Bihar, India
- Education: Jamia Mazharul Uloom, Banaras; Mazahir Uloom, Saharanpur; Darul Uloom Deoband; Jamia Arabia, Jama Masjid (Amroha); Aligarh Muslim University
- Known for: Founding Darul Uloom Husainia, Palamu district

Religious life
- Religion: Islam
- Denomination: Sunni Islam
- Jurisprudence: Hanafi
- Creed: Maturidi
- Movement: Deobandi

Tahir Hussain Gayavi (1947–2023), also written as Tahir Hussain Gayawi or Tahir Gayavi, was an Indian Hanafi Deobandi Islamic scholar and educator. He is noted for his writings and public speeches on Islamic theology, particularly in the areas of refutation of religious innovations (bidʻah) and defense of Sunni orthodoxy.

== Early life and education ==
Tahir Hussain Gayavi was born on 12 April 1947 (20 Jumada al-Awwal 1366 AH) in the village of Kābar, Konch block, Gaya district, Bihar (then part of British India).

He studied up to Arabic grade three at Madarsa Anwar al-Uloom in Gaya, then continued at Madarsa Mazharul Uloom, Banaras, where he also passed the "Maulvi" exam under the Allahabad Board with first division. After spending a year at Mazahir Uloom, Saharanpur, he was admitted to Darul Uloom Deoband in 1967. His education there was interrupted during the 1969 student strike.

He later completed his hadith studies at Jamia Islamia, Jama Masjid, Amroha in 1970 upon the advice of Syed Fakhruddin Ahmad. He also passed "Ālim" and "Fāzil" exams from the Allahabad Board and received the "Adeeb-e-Kamil" certificate from Aligarh Muslim University with first division.

== Career ==
After completing his studies, Gayavi taught for nearly nine years in various institutions in Banaras, including Madarsa Islamia Reori Talab, Banaras. In 1984 (1404 AH), he founded Darul Uloom Hussainia in Palamu district, which was then part of Bihar (now Jharkhand). He later established another institution of the same name in Sundru, Lohardaga district, Jharkhand, both of which are recognized as prominent religious seminaries.

Gayavi actively participated in theological debates and was known for his engagement in inter-sect polemics. His notable debates occurred in Jharia, Cuttack, and Katihar.

== Literary works ==
Gayavi authored several works, mostly in Urdu, on Islamic jurisprudence and theology. Some of his published books include:

- Ismat-e-Anbiya aur Maulana Maududi
- I'jaaz-e-Qurani
- Raza Khanit ke Alamatī Masā'il
- Al-Adad al-Sahih fi Raka'at al-Tarawih
- Namazon ke Baad ki Dua
- Shahid-e-Karbala aur Kirdar-e-Yazid
- Muqtadi par Fatiha Wajib Nahin
- Angusht Bosi se Bible Bosi tak
- Tark-e-Taqleed Ek Bidat Hai (Urdu translation of Bida'at-u-Tark al-Madhāhib al-Fiqhiyyah by Adeeb al-Kamdāni)
- Barelwiyat ka Sheesh Mahal
- Mas'ala-e-Qudrat
- Hadith-e-Thaqalayn
- Khutbat-e-Munazir-e-Islam

== Death ==
Gayavi died on 10 July 2023 (21 Dhu al-Hijjah 1444 AH) in Arrah, Bhojpur district, Bihar. His funeral prayer was held the next day after Maghrib prayer at Wali Ganj Haveli Mosque in Arrah, followed by burial at the local cemetery in Rauzah Ganj.

Sanaul Huda Qasmi, Deputy Administrator of Imarat-e-Shariah, described Gayavi's death as a significant loss for Islamic scholarship. He stated that Gayavi had dedicated over five decades to advocating the Hanafi school of thought and the Deobandi tradition, particularly in India and among related scholarly circles.
