= Catherine B. Asher =

Catherine Ella Blanshard Asher (1946-2023), who published as Catherine B. Asher and was known to friends as Cathy Asher, was an American art historian. Professor of art history at the University of Minnesota, she was "an expert on premodern South Asian and Islamic art and architecture".

== Life ==
Asher gained her PhD in art history from the University of Minnesota in 1984, with a thesis on 'The Patronage of Sher Shah Suri: A Study of Form and Meaning in 16th Century Indo-Islamic Architecture'. She went on to become first Assistant Professor and then Professor at the University of Minnesota.

Asher was married for 52 years to Frederick M. Asher, also an art history professor at the University of Minnesota, who died in 2021.

She died at her home in Minneapolis on April 14, 2023.

== Works ==
- (ed. with Thomas Metcalf) Perceptions of South Asia’s Visual Past. AIIS and Oxford New Delhi, 1994. OCLC 32199400
- Architecture of Mughal India. The New Cambridge History of India. Cambridge University Press. Revised, republished 2001. OCLC 793601485
- (with Cynthia Talbot) India before Europe. Cambridge University Press, 2006. OCLC 1328141036
- Dehli's Qutb Complex: The Minar, Mosque and Mehrauli. Marg Publications, 2017. OCLC 1006412542
