= Laat Bhairav =

Small Hindu temple

Laat Bhairava is a small Hindu temple of Bhairava in Varanasi, which is surrounded by Muslim graveyards and Masjid. It stands on a small platform and is open to sky covered by temporary shed.

== Ashokan Pillar ==
Many sources mention that current structure of Laat Bhariva was earlier one of the Ashokan Pillars and it was 35 feet in height as per Tavernier and was destroyed by Auragzeb in 1669. The remaining height was further destroyed by Muslims during Hindu Muslim Riots of 1809 and the pillar was reduced to a size of a stump. This riot is known as Laat Bhairav Riots. According to some sources what remained of stupa is now worshiped by Hindus as Laat Bhairav's idol.

== Hindu Temple ==
Laat Bhairava is considered as one of the eight Bhairavas by Hindus, which are said to be guardian deity of Mahadev - the Kashi Vishwanath. To the north-east of the temple there is a pond which is considered sacred by Hindus and is known as Kapalamochana Tirtha. The temple is a housed in a small cylindrical structure on an open ground, which surrounded by Masjids and Majars on a land which is controlled by Muslim community. On Fridays, they even offer namaj on the same ground where the Laat Bhairava Temple stands. The temple is said to have been destroyed by Aurangzeb in 1669 after he demolished Kashi Vishwanath Temple. The French traveler Tavernier mentioned in 1670 that this structure was about 35 feet tall. After Aurangzeb’s death in 1707, efforts began by Hindus to reclaim and restore what was left of the temple. Later, in 1809, during what is recorded as the first communal riot in history—known as the ‘Lat Bhairav Riot’—this structure suffered significant damage. At that time, the Hindu community covered and preserved the remaining portion of the structure, which was about 14 to 16 feet high, as a way to protect what was left. The current cylindrical structure is covered with copper plate, which has engraved the face and body of Bhairava and is generally covered with sindoor. In earlier centuries on 5 Hindus were allowed only on special days but presently there are no such restrictions although the area remains under Muslim control and this temple is located in the Muslim-majority Saraiya area. There is a large Muslim population living surrounding the temple. In 2021, a faction of the Hindu side filed a case in the Varanasi Civil Court to reclaim their rights. Hearings are currently ongoing in the court regarding this matter. The Hindu side is demanding that the entire complex be handed over to them and permission be granted for temple construction but the Muslim side is not agreeable to this. .
