= Vaṭeśvara-siddhānta =

Indian mathematical and astronomical text

Vaṭeśvara-siddhānta is a mathematical and astronomical treatise by Vaṭeśvara in India in 904. This treatise contains fifteen chapters on astronomy and applied mathematics.

Mathematical exercises are included for students to show their comprehension of the text.
