= Sarah Lamb (anthropologist) =

American anthropologist

Sarah Lamb (born 6 February 1960) is an American cultural anthropologist known for her writings on aging. She is Professor of Anthropology and Women's, Gender and Sexuality Studies and Barbara Mandel Professor of Humanistic Social Sciences at Brandeis University in Waltham, Massachusetts.

She studies the ways people construct their social-cultural worlds and identities, particularly surrounding age, gender, the body, family, religion, and nation.

Lamb is the author of several books, including White Saris and Sweet Mangoes: Aging, Gender, and Body in North India (UC Press), Aging and the Indian Diaspora: Cosmopolitan Families in India and Abroad (Indiana U Press), Being Single in India: Stories of Gender, Exclusion, and Possibility (UC Press), and editor of Successful Aging as a Contemporary Obsession: Global Perspectives (Rutgers U Press and Everyday Life in South Asia (Indiana U Press, in two editions)

== Early life and education ==
Lamb was born and grew up in Berkeley, California to Sharon Rowell and distinguished American linguist Sydney Lamb. She completed a BA in Religious Studies with honors at Brown University in 1982. Then, she completed an MA (1985) and PhD (1993) in Anthropology at the University of Chicago. Her dissertation, titled "Growing in the Net of Maya: Persons, Gender and Life Processes in a Bengali Society," received the Saller Prize awarded each year to the most outstanding dissertation in the social sciences at the University of Chicago.

== Career ==
=== Research interests ===
Lamb has authored numerous books and articles based on ethnographic research in both India and the United States. Her work examines aging, gender, families, ethical strivings, and understandings of personhood. Through participant-observation, fieldwork and interviewing, Lamb probes the ways people construct their social-cultural worlds and identities, with particular attention to aging, gender, body, family, and moral life. She critically analyzes everyday life practices and experiences, medical and legal discourses, and taken-for-granted assumptions to understand how subjectivities and social-cultural worlds are produced. Lamb's current Carnegie-funded project examines "successful aging" as a contemporary obsession and cultural-biopolitical project, prevailing in North America and with diverse instantiations around the globe.

=== Graduate and postgraduate work ===
As a graduate student, Lamb conducted extensive ethnographic fieldwork in India. She spent a year collecting narratives and life histories of Bengali widows in 1985 and returned to West Bengal in 1989 for her dissertation fieldwork on aging, gender, and the making and unmaking of persons. Her early research was primarily based in a large Bengali village, with other work in Kolkata (then Calcutta) and places of pilgrimage. Lamb also pursued advanced language studies at the American Institute of Indian Studies, Kolkata. Her first book, White Saris and Sweet Mangoes: Aging, Gender and Body in North India, was based on this work.

Between 1993 and 2004, Lamb conducted field research in San Francisco and Boston, examining the experiences of older immigrants from India and their families as they think about aging practices and creatively combine and rework the ideas, values, images, and lifeways comprising what they perceive to be "India" and "America." In 2003 and 2006, Lamb returned to India to conduct fieldwork in Kolkata and New Delhi on aging and understandings of modernity in cosmopolitan India, including the surge of old age homes, increasing numbers of elderly living alone, and the transnational dispersal of families. This work led to her next book, Aging and the Indian Diaspora: Cosmopolitan Families in India and Abroad.

Starting in 2013, Lamb worked on two main projects, one located in India and one in the United States. In India, she explored the narratives and experiences of never-married single women. Through this work, she contributed to studies of personhood and social transformations, and published her third book, Being Single in India: Stories of Gender, Exclusion, and Possibility (UC Press). In the United States, she conducted fieldwork investigating the narratives of healthy and successful aging, analyzig public health, medical, and popular media, and conducted interviews with Americans in Massachusetts, California, and the US South. This project was complemented by her comparative fieldwork in India.

=== Academic roles and appointments ===
Lamb held a postdoctoral fellowship from 1993 to 1995 in sociocultural gerontology at the University of California, San Francisco Medical Anthropology Program following her PhD. She transitioned to Brandeis University as an Assistant Professor of Anthropology in 1995. At Brandeis, she served as the Head of Division of Social Sciences (2013–2018), Chair of the Anthropology Department (July 2007 – June 2011; July 2022 – June 2024, July 2025-June 2026), and Chair of Women's, Gender and Sexuality Studies (2019–2020). She is currently Professor of Anthropology and Women's, Gender, and Sexuality Studies, and Barbara Mandel Professor of Humanistic Social Sciences at Brandeis University

At Brandeis University, Lamb mentors both undergraduate and graduate students, and teaches both undergraduate and graduate courses that focus on Personhood, Gender, Aging, Transnationalism, South Asian cultures, Modernity, Medical Anthropology, and related topics.

== Editorships ==
Lamb is the founding editor of the Rutgers University Press series Global Perspectives on Aging. Lamb also serves on the editorial boards of several journals, including Aging & Anthropology, Medical Anthropology Quarterly, Journal of Cross-Cultural Gerontology, and Journal of the Indian Anthropological Society.

== Awards and honors ==
- 2022: 58th Lewis Henry Morgan Lecture, Department of Anthropology, University of Rochester: "Successful Aging's Global Moment: Visions and Dilemmas of Aging Well."

== Publications ==
=== Books ===
- White Saris and Sweet Mangoes: Aging, Gender and Body in North India. Berkeley: University of California Press, 2000
- Everyday Life in South Asia. Diane P. Mines and Sarah Lamb, eds. Bloomington: Indiana University Press, 2002 (1st edition) and 2010 (2nd edition)
- Aging and the Indian Diaspora: Cosmopolitan Families in India and Abroad. Bloomington: Indiana University Press, 2009
- Successful Aging as a Contemporary Obsession: Global Perspectives, edited by Sarah Lamb. New Brunswick, NJ: Rutgers University Press, 2017
- Being Single in India: Stories of Gender, Exclusion, and Possibility. University of California Press, 2022.

=== Selected articles ===
- 1997. The Making and Unmaking of Persons: Notes on Aging and Gender in North India. Ethos 25(3):279-302. The Making and Unmaking of Persons: Notes on Aging and Gender in North India
- 1999. Aging, Gender and Widowhood: Perspectives from Rural West Bengal. Contributions to Indian Sociology33(3):541-570. Aging, gender and widowhood: Perspectives from rural West Bengal
- 2001. Being a Widow and Other Life Stories: The Interplay between Lives and Words. Anthropology and Humanism26(1):16-34. Being a Widow and Other Life Stories: The Interplay between Lives and Words
- 2002. Intimacy in a Transnational Era: The Remaking of Aging among Indian Americans. Diaspora: A Journal of Transnational Studies. 11(3): 299-330. Intimacy in a Transnational Era: The Remaking of Aging among Indian Americans
- 2005. Cultural and Moral Values Surrounding Care and (In)Dependence in Late Life: Reflections from India in an Era of Global Modernity. Journal of Long Term Home Health Care 6(2):80-89. DOI: 10.1891/cmaj.6.2.80
- 2010. Rethinking the Generation Gap: Age and Agency in Middle-Class Kolkata. Journal of Aging, Humanities, and the Arts 4(2): 83-97. Rethinking the Generation Gap: Age and Agency in Middle-Class Kolkata.
- 2013. In/dependence, Intergenerational Uncertainty, and the Ambivalent State: Perceptions of Old Age Security in India. South Asia: Journal of South Asian Studies n.s., 36(1): 65-78. In/dependence, Intergenerational Uncertainty, and the Ambivalent State: Perceptions of Old Age Security in India
- 2014. Permanent Personhood or Meaningful Decline? Toward a Critical Anthropology of Successful Aging. Journal of Aging Studies 29: 41-52. DOI: 10.1016/j.jaging.2013.12.006
- 2015. Beyond the View of the West: Ageing and Anthropology. In Cultural Handbook of Gerontology, 1st edition. Julia Twigg and Wendy Martin, eds. pp. 37–44. New York: Routledge.
- 2018. Being Single in India: Gendered Identities, Class Mobilities, and Personhoods in Flux. Ethos 46(1): 49-69. Being Single in India: Gendered Identities, Class Mobilities, and Personhoods in Flux
- 2019. On Being (Not) Old: Agency, Self-Care, and Life-Course Aspirations in the United States. Medical Anthropology Quarterly 33(2): 263-281. doi: 10.1111/maq.12498
- 2020. On Vulnerability, Resilience, and Age: Older Americans Reflect on the Pandemic. Anthropology & Aging 41(2): 177-186. DOI: On Vulnerability, Resilience, and Age: Older Americans Reflect on the Pandemic
- 2021. Freedom to Choose? Singlehood, Gender, and Sexuality in India. In Opting Out: Women Messing with Marriage around the World, Joanna Davidson and Dinah Hannaford, eds. Rutgers University Press.
- 2023. Who Wants to Have an Aged Self If to Age Is So Bad? Ageless and Aged Selves as Cultural Constructs. The Ageless Self Debate. Anthropology & Aging 44(1): 107-110. Who Wants to Have an Aged Self If to Age Is So Bad? Ageless and Aged Selves as Cultural Constructs
- 2024. Sarah Lamb and Nilanjana Goswami. Healthy Aging, Self-Care, and Choice in India: Class-based Engagements with Globally Circulating Ideologies. Journal of Aging Studies 68: 1-11. Healthy aging, self-care, and choice in India: Class-based engagements with globally circulating ideologies
- 2025. Successful Aging's Global Moment: Visions and Dilemmas of Aging Well." Lewis Henry Morgan Lecture. HAU: Journal of Ethnographic Theory 15(1): 8-25. Successful aging’s global moment: Visions and dilemmas of aging well
