= Kashi Vishwanath Temple =

Hindu temple in Varanasi, Uttar Pradesh, India

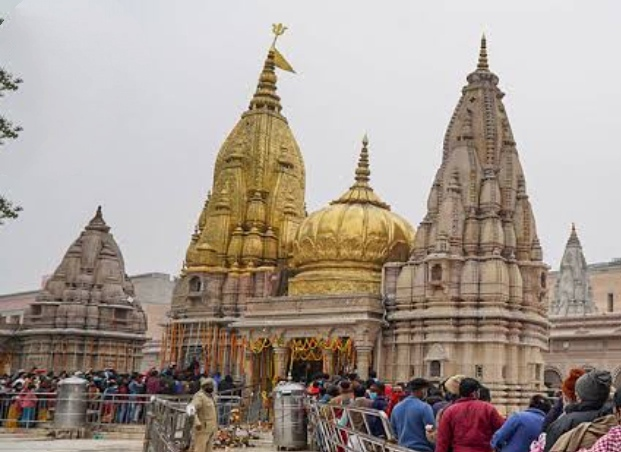
- Entrance to present temple built by Ahilyabai Holkar in 1780.

- Location within Varanasi district Location within Uttar Pradesh

Religion
- Affiliation: Hinduism
- District: Varanasi
- Deity: Vishveshwara or Vishwanath (Shiva)
- Festival: Maha Shivaratri
- Governing body: Shri Kashi Vishwanath Temple Trust

Location
- Location: Varanasi
- State: Uttar Pradesh
- Country: India
- Coordinates: 25°18′38.79″N 83°0′38.21″E

Architecture
- Type: Mandir
- Creator: 1585 - by Man Singh I and Raja Todar Mal; 1780 - by Maharani Ahilyabai Holkar; 1835 Gold Plating - by Maharaja Ranjeet Singh, Sikh Empire; 2021 Kashi Vishwanath corridor - by Prime Minister Narendra Modi
- Completed: 1780
- Demolished: 1194 by Muhammad Ghori; 1505-1515 by Sikandar Lodi; 1669 by Aurangzeb

Website
- shrikashivishwanath.org

Kashi Vishwanath Temple is a Hindu temple dedicated to Shiva. It is located in Vishwanath Gali, in Varanasi, Uttar Pradesh, India. The temple is a Hindu pilgrimage site and is one of the twelve Jyotirlinga shrines. The presiding deity is known by the names Vishwanath and Vishweshwara (IAST: Viśvanātha and Viśveśvara), meaning Lord of the Universe.

The original temple, called the Adi Vishveshwar Temple, was demolished by Mohammad of Ghori during his invasion of India. Subsequently, the temple was rebuilt by Man Singh I and Todar Mal under the emperor Akbar.

According to several historical accounts, the Mughal Emperor Aurangzeb ordered the demolition of the Hindu temple in 1669. Subsequently, in 1678, the Gyanvapi Mosque was built on its site, but Hindu pilgrims continued to visit the remnants of the temple. Some scholars claim that the demolition was motivated by the rebellion of local zamindars (landowners) who were associated with the temple. The demolition was intended as a warning by Aurangzeb to the anti-Mughal factions and Hindu religious leaders in the city.

The current structure was constructed on an adjacent site by the Maratha ruler Ahilyabai Holkar of Indore in 1780. In 2021, a major redevelopment of the temple complex was completed, and the Kashi Vishwanath Dham Corridor connecting the Ganga river with the temple was inaugurated by Prime Minister Modi, leading to a many-fold increase in visitors. It has become one of the most visited Hindu temples in India, with an average 45,000 pilgrims per day in 2023. The total assets of the temple, were estimated to be more than ₹6 crores in 2024.

== Legend ==
It is believed that Varanasi is the first Jyotirlinga to manifest itself. According to the legend, it was at this place that Shiva (the Hindu god of destruction) manifested as an infinite column of light (Jyotirlinga, depicted as lingodbhava) in front of Brahma (the Hindu god of creation) and Vishnu (the Hindu god of preservation) when they had an argument about their supremacy.

In order to discover the origin of the luminous column, Vishnu took the form of a boar (Varaha) and tracked the column beneath the ground, while Brahma, who assumed the shape of a swan, scoured the heavens in an attempt to locate the apex of the column. However, both of them were unsuccessful in identifying the source of the luminous column. Yet, Brahma deceitfully asserted that he had discovered the summit of the column, while Vishnu humbly admitted his inability to find the starting point of the radiant column. Due to Brahma's deceit over the discovery of the origin of the luminous column, Shiva penalised him by cutting his fifth head and placing a curse upon him. This curse entailed that Brahma would no longer receive reverence, whereas Vishnu, being truthful, would be equally venerated alongside Shiva and have dedicated temples for eternity.

Hindu scriptures describe Vishweshwara as the sacred deity of Varanasi, holding the position of king over all the other deities as well as over all the inhabitants of the city and the extended circuit of the Panchkoshi, an area (the sacred boundary of Varanasi) spreading over 50 miles.

== History ==
=== Ancient and classical periods ===
The Skanda Purana contains a part titled "Kashi Khanda", while the Brahmavaivarta Purana includes a portion known as "Kashi Rahasya", both of which are dedicated to the city of Varanasi. As per the Kashi Khanda of the Skanda Purana, there were a total of 1099 temples, out of which 513 were specifically devoted to the worship of Shiva. The scripture states that the Vishvanath temple was formerly known as Moksha Lakshmi Vilas, and the temple housed a total of five mandapas (halls). The lingam of Vishwanath was situated in the garbhagriha (innermost sanctuary). The remaining four mandapas include the Jnana mandapa located to the east, the Ranga mandapa to the west, the Aishvarya mandapa to the north, and the Mukti mandapa to the south. Kashi Vishwanath is also one of the shrines of the Vaippu Sthalams sung by Tamil Saivite Nayanar Sambandar.

Nārāyaṇa Bhaṭṭa, in his book Tristhalisetu, as well as Madhuri Desai describe that the temple centres around a repetition of destruction and reconstruction.

=== Medieval period and destruction ===
The original Vishwanath temple, initially known as the Adi Vishveshwar Temple, was destroyed by the Ghurids in 1194, when Mu'izz al-Din Muhammad ibn Sam returned to India and defeated Jayachandra of Kannauj near Chandawar and afterwards razed the city of Kashi. between 1236 and 1240, the Razia Mosque was constructed in its place. By the end of the 13th century, the temple was rebuilt near the Avimukteshwara Temple, away from the original site, during the reign of Sultan Iltutmish. The structure remained in use until the fifteenth century, when it was damaged during the rule of the Sharqi rulers of Jaunpur and was later demolished under Sikandar Lodi in 1490.

=== Mughal period ===
Sketches by James Prinsep

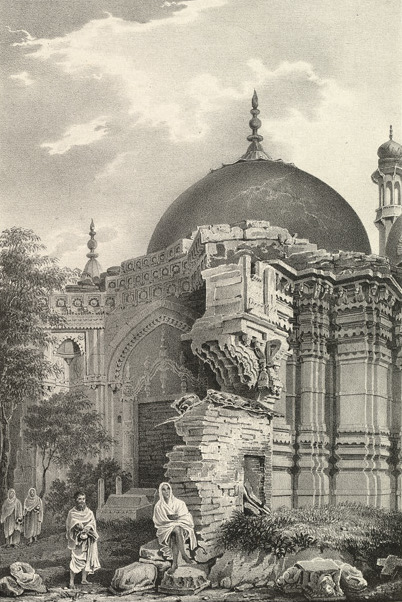
The Gyanvapi Mosque sketched as the Temple of Vishveshwur, Benares.

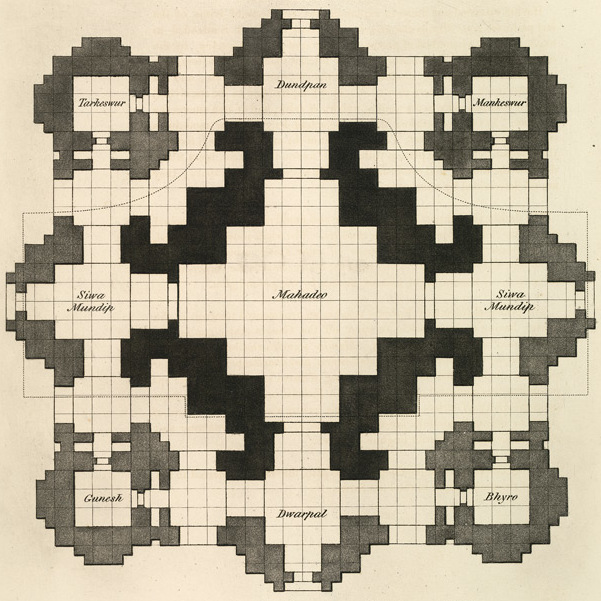
Plan of the Ancient Temple of Vishveshwar.
The dotted line shows the portion of the temple occupied by the present Masjid.

Raja Man Singh started rebuilding the temple during Akbar's reign. Raja Todar Mal furthered the reconstruction of the temple in 1585.

In the seventeenth century, during the rule of Jahangir, Vir Singh Deo completed the construction of the earlier temple. According to some historians, such as James G. Lochtefed, the Mahanirvani Akhara reportedly defended against Aurangzeb's forces and claimed victory over his army in 1664. Lochtefed based this claim on handwritten manuscripts in the akhara's archives. Many historians suggest that this battle, may have contributed to Aurangzeb's decision to demolish the temple in 1669, as a punishment for armed resistance rather than purely religious iconoclasm.

In 1669, Mughal Emperor Aurangzeb destroyed the temple and built the Gyanvapi Mosque in its place. The remains of the erstwhile temple can be seen in the foundation, the columns, and the rear part of the mosque.

=== Maratha and British period ===
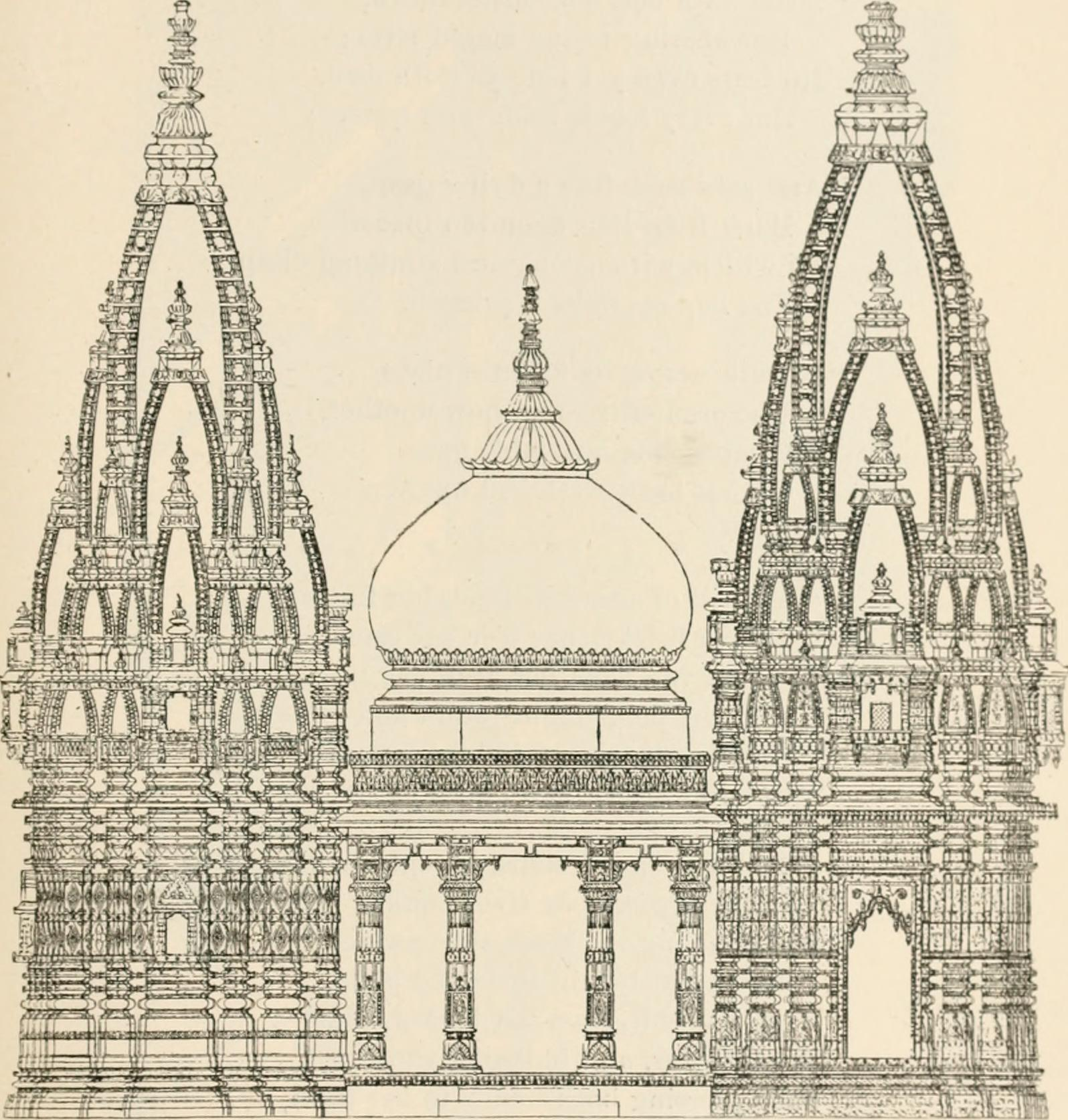
Elevation of the present temple structure

In 1742, the Maratha ruler Malhar Rao Holkar devised a plan to demolish the mosque and reconstruct the Vishweshwar temple at the site. However, his plan did not materialise, partly because of the intervention of the Nawab of Awadh, who was given control of the territory. In 1750, the Maharaja of Jaipur commissioned a survey of the land around the site with the objective of purchasing land to rebuild the Kashi Vishwanath temple, which in turn failed.

In 1785, at the behest of Governor General Warren Hastings, Collector Mohammed Ibrahim constructed a Naubatkhana in front of the temple. In 1780, Malhar Rao's daughter-in-law, Ahilyabai Holkar, built the present temple adjacent to the mosque. In 1828, Baiza Bai, widow of the Maratha ruler Daulat Rao Scindhia of Gwalior State, built a low-roofed colonnade with over 40 pillars in the Gyan Vapi precinct.

Many noble families from various ancestral kingdoms of the Indian subcontinent, and their predecessor states, made generous contributions to the operation of the temple. In 1835, Maharaja Ranjit Singh of the Sikh Empire, at the behest of his wife, Maharani Datar Kaur, donated 1 tonne of gold for plating the temple's dome. In 1841, Raghuji Bhonsle III of Nagpur donated silver to the temple.

The temple was managed by a hereditary group of pandits. After the death of Mahant Devi Dutt, a dispute arose among his successors. In 1900, his brother-in-law, Pandit Visheshwar Dayal Tewari, filed a lawsuit, which resulted in him being declared the head priest.

=== Post-Independence ===
Since 1983, the temple has been managed by a board of trustees set up by the government of Uttar Pradesh. The Puja of the Maa Shringar Gauri Temple, on the western side of the disputed Gyanvapi Mosque, was restricted after the demolition of the Babri Masjid in December 1992, due to the ensuing deadly riots that followed the demolition of the mosque. In August 2021, five Hindu women petitioned a local court in Varanasi to be allowed to pray at the Maa Shringar Gauri Temple.

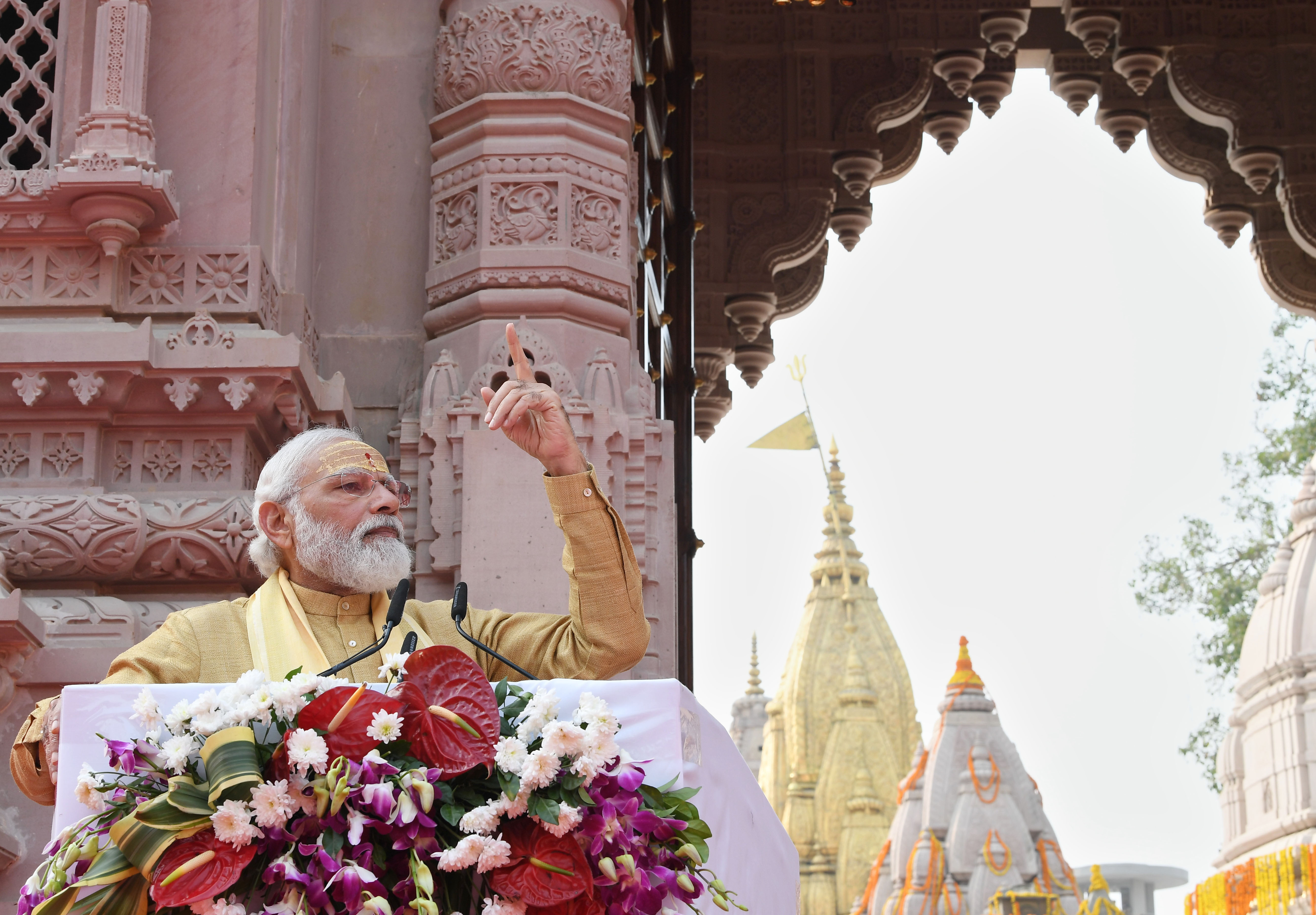
Prime Minister Narendra Modi speaking at the inauguration of the renovated Kashi Vishwanath Corridor on 13 December 2021.

After 239 years, the Kumbhabhishekham (consecration ceremony) of the temple was held on 5 July 2018, which was conducted by Nattukottai Nagarathar, a mercantile community of Tamil Nadu.

The Kashi Vishwanath Corridor Project was launched by Prime Minister Narendra Modi in 2019 to make it easier to travel between the temple and the Ganges River and to create more space to prevent crowding. On 13 December 2021, Modi inaugurated the corridor with a sacred ceremony. A press release by the government said that around 1,400 residents and businesses within the corridor's area were relocated elsewhere and compensated. It also said that more than 40 ruined, centuries-old temples were found and rebuilt, including the Gangeshwar Mahadev temple, the Manokameshwar Mahadev temple, the Jauvinayak temple, and the Shri Kumbha Mahadev temple.

In February 2022, the sanctum sanctorum of the temple was gold-plated after an anonymous donor from South India donated 60 kg of gold to the temple. Flowers from the temple are recycled into incense by the biomaterials startup Phool.co.

As of August 2023, the Kashi Vishwanath Temple Trust reported that 10 crore (100 million) tourists had visited the temple since the inauguration of the corridor in December 2021.

== Temple complex ==
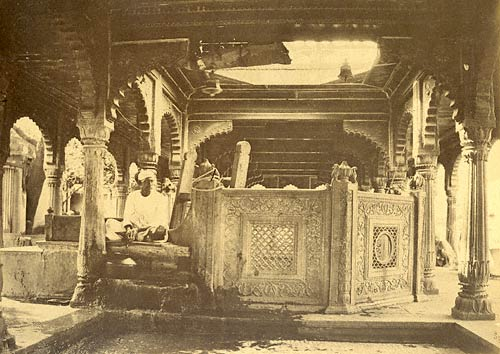
The original holy well—Gyanvapi is in between the temple and Gyanvapi Mosque

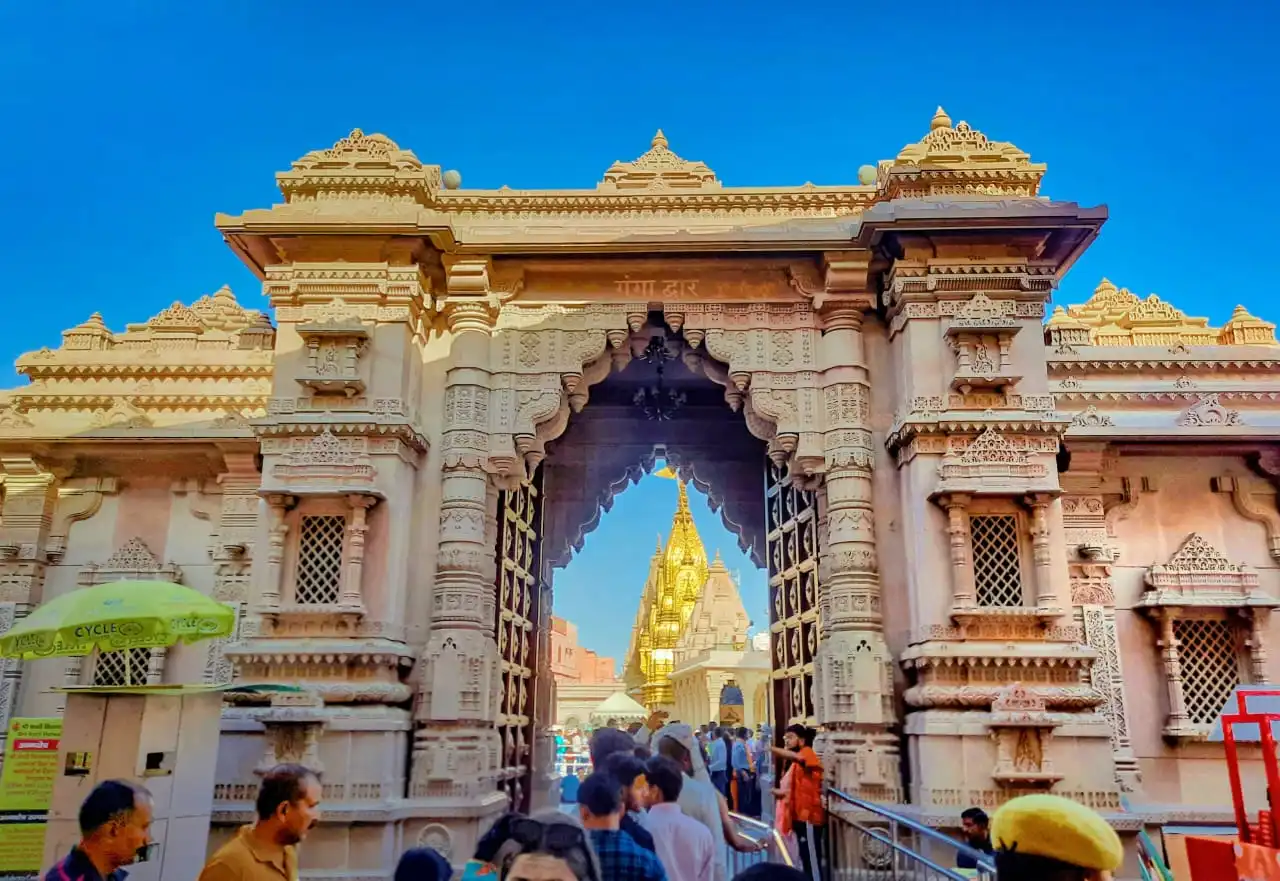
Ganga Dwara, Gateway of Corridor that connects Kashi Vishwanath Temple with Ghats of the Ganges.

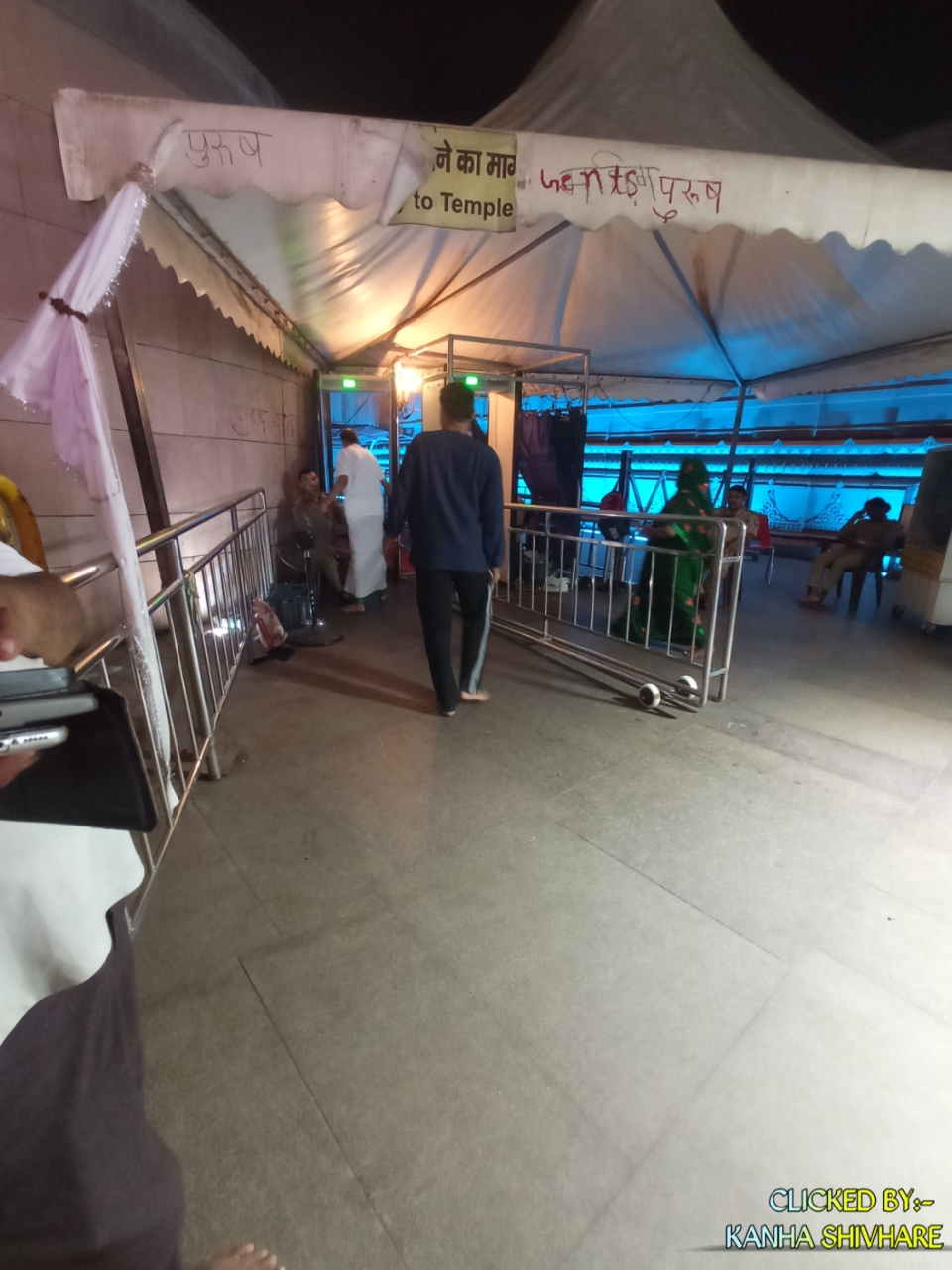
Checking point at Kashi Vishwanath annapurna Entrance

The temple complex consists of a series of smaller shrines located in a small lane called the Vishwanatha Gali, near the river. The linga of the main deity at the shrine is 60 centimetres (24 in) tall and 90 centimetres (35 in) in circumference, housed in a silver altar. The main temple is a quadrangle, and there are shrines to other deities around it. There are small temples for Kala Bhairava, Kartikeya, Avimukteshwara, Vishnu, Ganesha, Shani, Shiva, and Parvati in the complex.

There is a small well in the temple called the Jnana Vapi, also spelled Gyan Vapi (the wisdom well). The Jnana Vapi is located to the north of the main temple, and during the invasion by the Mughals, the jyotirlinga was hidden in the well to protect it. It is said that the main priest of the temple jumped in the well with the lingam in order to protect the jyotirlinga from invaders.

There is a Sabha Griha (congregation hall) leading to the inner Garbha Griha (sanctum sanctorum). The jyotirlinga is enshrined in the sanctuary and placed on a silver platform. The structure of the temple is composed of three parts. The first consists of a 15.5-meter-high spire on the temple; the second is a gold dome; and the third is the gold spire within the sanctuary bearing a flag and a trident.

The Kashi Vishwanath Temple is popularly known as the Golden Temple, due to the gold plating of its spire. One tonne of gold donated by Maharaja Ranjit Singh has been used in the gold plating, as well as in three domes, each made up of pure gold, donated in 1835. The Shri Kashi Vishwanath Dham corridor was constructed between Kashi Vishwanath Temple and Manikarnika Ghat along the Ganges River, providing various amenities for pilgrims.

== Religious importance ==
Located on the banks of the holy river Ganges, Varanasi is regarded as among the holiest of the Hindu cities. The Kashi Vishwanath Temple is widely recognised as one of the most important places of worship in the Hindu religion, because the it holds the jyotirlinga of Shiva Vishveshwara, or Vishvanath.

A visit to the temple and a bath in the Ganges is one of many methods believed to lead one on a path to moksha (liberation). Thus, Hindus from all over the world try to visit the place at least once in their lifetime. There is also a tradition that one should give up at least one desire after a pilgrimage to the temple, and the pilgrimage would also include a visit to the temple at Rameswaram in Tamil Nadu in South India, to which people take water samples of the Ganges to perform prayer there and bring back sand from near that temple.

== Festivals ==
12 days after Maha Shivaratri, on the occasion of Rangbhari Ekadashi (Phalgun Shukla Ekadashi), Shiva returns to Kashi with his consort Parvati. The temple complex echoes with the beating of dozens of damroos (two-sided drums) as the couple is welcomed. This tradition has been performed for over 200 years. On Vasant Panchami, a Tilak is applied on Baba (Baba is an affectionate name for Shiva used by devotees). These traditions have been carried out by the erstwhile Mahant family of the temple for over a century.

These rituals of Baba's marriage ceremony are performed at the residence of Kulpati Tiwari, the erstwhile Mahant of Shri Kashi Vishwanath Temple in Redzone. The seven rituals of Saptarishi Aarti were performed by Baba Vishwanath. According to the Puranas, Kashi is beloved by the Saptarishi; so, according to the tradition, the devotees of the Saptarishi Aarti perform the rituals of marriage. The seven archaks under the leadership of Pradhan Archak Pandit Shashibhushan Tripathi (Guddu Maharaj) completed the marriage in Vedic rituals. Mangala Aarti is performed at 3:30 am, Bhog Aarti at 12:00 pm, Saptarishi Aarti at 7:30 pm and Shringar Aarti at 11:00 pm.

The Yadav community of Kashi associated with Chandravanshi Gop Seva Samiti and Shree Krishna Yadav Mahasabha have been performing jalabhishek on a shivling, traditionally for 94 years, starting in 1932.

== See also ==
- Shri Vishwanath Mandir
- Vishalakshi Temple
- Mrityunjay Mahadev Mandir
- Ratneshwar Mahadev temple
- List of Hindu temples in Varanasi
- Nandmahar Dham
- Mata Mawai Dham
- Shree Kashi Karvat Mandir

== Notes ==
- Chaturvedi, B. K. (2006), Shiv Purana (First ed.), New Delhi: Diamond Pocket Books (P) Ltd, ISBN 81-7182-721-7
- Eck, Diana L. (1999), Banaras, city of light (First ed.), New York: Columbia University Press, ISBN 0-231-11447-8
- Gwynne, Paul (2009), World Religions in Practice: A Comparative Introduction, Oxford: Blackwell Publication, ISBN 978-1-4051-6702-4.
- Harding, Elizabeth U. (1998). "God, the Father". Kali: The Black Goddess of Dakshineswar. Motilal Banarsidass. pp. 156–157. ISBN 978-81-208-1450-9.
- Lochtefeld, James G. (2002), The Illustrated Encyclopedia of Hinduism: A-M, Rosen Publishing Group, p. 122, ISBN 0-8239-3179-X
- R., Venugopalam (2003), Meditation: Any Time Any Where (First ed.), Delhi: B. Jain Publishers (P) Ltd., ISBN 81-8056-373-1
- Vivekananda, Swami. "The Paris Congress of the History of Religions". The Complete Works of Swami Vivekananda. Vol. 4.
