= Ratneshwar Mahadev temple =

Temple in India

Ratneshwar Mahadev Mandir
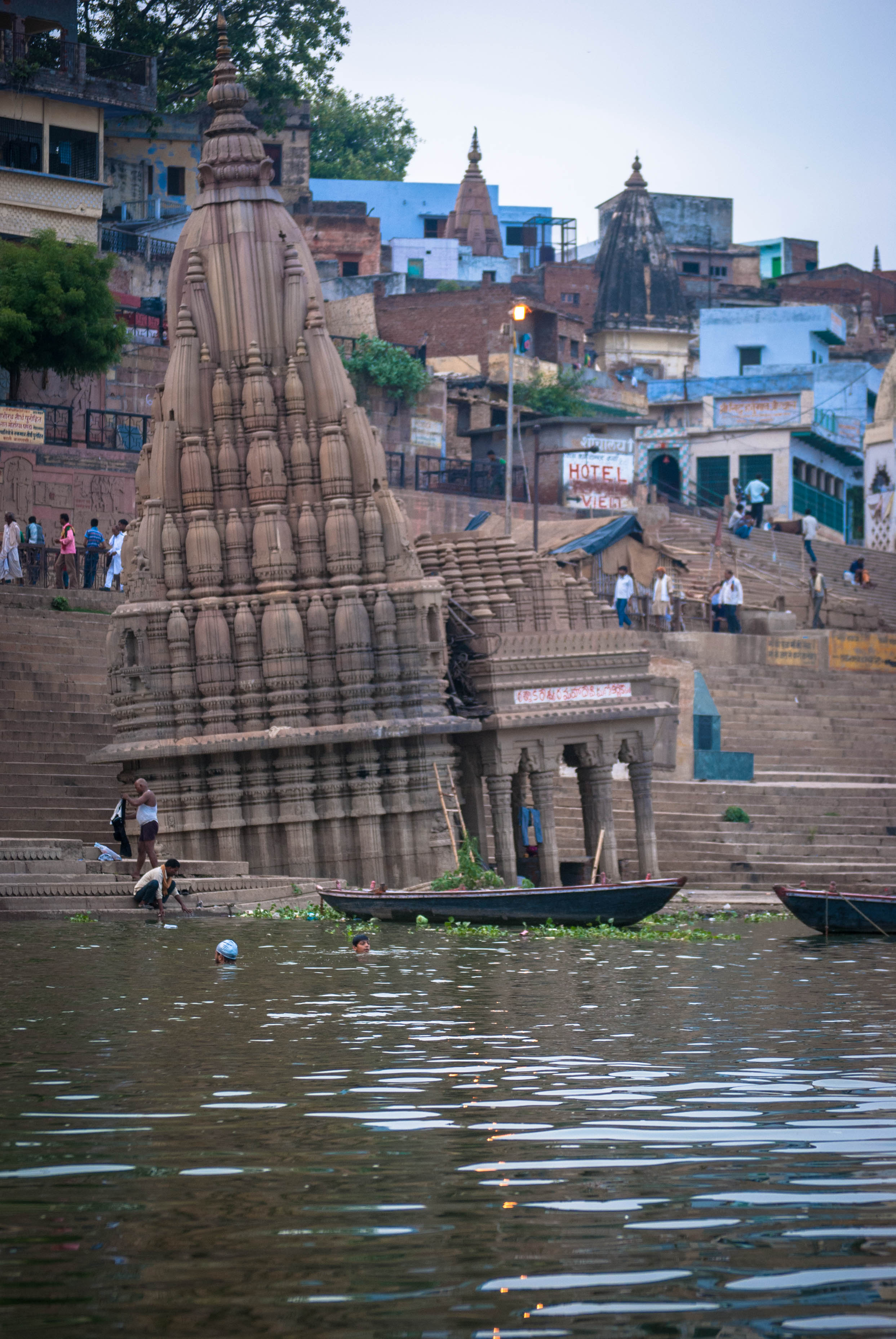
- Ratneshwar Mahadev Temple

Religion
- Affiliation: Hinduism
- District: Varanasi
- Deity: Shiva
- Festival: Mahashivratri

Location
- Location: Manikarnika Ghat, Varanasi
- State: Uttar Pradesh
- Country: India
- Interactive map of Ratneshwar Mahadev Mandir
- Coordinates: 25.3119°N 83.01603°E

Architecture
- Completed: 19th century based upon records, earlier by legend
- Elevation: 25 m (82 ft)

Ratneshwar Mahadev Mandir (also known as Matri-rin Mahadev, or Leaning temple of Varanasi) is one of the most photographed Hindu temples in the holy city of Varanasi in Uttar Pradesh, India. The temple, while apparently well-preserved, leans significantly towards the back side (north-west), and its garbhagriha is generally below the water much of the year, except for a few months during the summer. The Ratneshwar Mahadev Temple is situated at Manikarnika Ghat, Varanasi. The temple has developed a nine-degree slant.

== Architecture ==
It was built by Aman Dev. The temple is elegantly constructed in the classical style with a Nagara Shikhara and Samvarna mandapa. The site of the temple is very unusual. Unlike all other temples in Varanasi on the banks of Ganga, the temple is built at a very low level. In fact, the water level can reach the shikhara part of the temple.

It is constructed at a very low spot; the builder must have known that its garbhagriha would be underwater for much of the year. In spite of much of the temple being underwater during most of the year, it is well preserved, except for the lean that can be noted in 20th century photos.

A number of online posts have falsely stated that the temple is 74 m high, however the actual height is estimated to be somewhere around 13 m

== History ==
The Temple is also known as Kashi Karvat (Kashi is the ancient name for Varanasi and karvat means leaning in Hindi). The actual time of construction is unknown.

James Prinsep, who was an assay master at the Banaras Mint from 1820 to 1830, created a series of drawings, one of which includes the Ratneshwar Mahadev temple. He commented that when the temple entrance was underwater, the priest used to dive in the water to conduct worship.

Photographs from 1860s do not show the building leaning. Modern photographs show a lean of about nine degrees. The building is likely leaning due to waterlogged foundation.

A lightning strike in 2015 caused slight damage to some of the elements of the shikhara.

=== Theory related to its origin ===
The priests claim that it was built by an unnamed servant of Raja Man Singh for his mother Ratna Bai about 500 years ago. According to the revenue records, it was constructed from 1825 to 1830. However, according to Dr. Ratnesh Varma of District Cultural Committee, it was constructed by the Amethi royal family.

Some sources claim that was built by Queen Baija Bai of Gwalior in the 19th century. According to another story, it was built by a female servant of Ahilya Bai of Indore, named Ratna Bai. Ahilya Bai cursed it to lean because her servant had named it after herself.

== Location ==
The temple in Manikarnika Ghat is located in front to the Tarkeshwar Mahadev Mandir built in 1795 by Ahilyabai Holkar, where Lord Shiva is said to recite the Taraka Mantra (salvation mantra). Between the two temple is a spot that was termed as the holiest spot in Banaras by James Prinsep in 1832. An 1865 photograph terms one of the temples as the Vishnupad temple. It is likely the Ganesh temple with the Charan Paduka of Lord Vishnu near it (only distinguished individuals can be cremated at the spot). The same spot is said to have been the site of a Sati in a 1903 print.

== Gallery ==
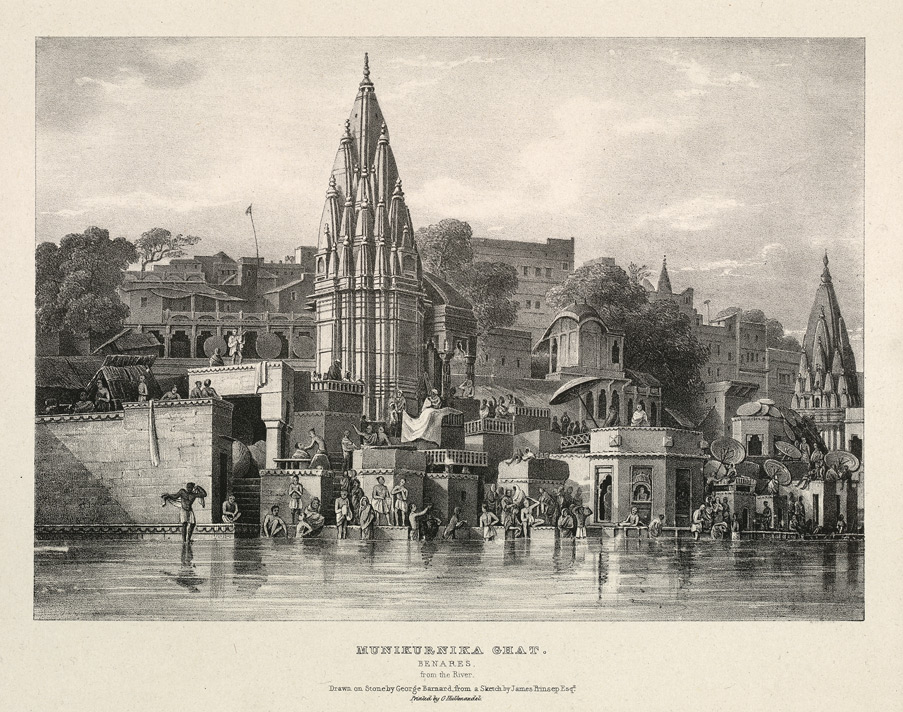
Manikarnika Ghat Benares from the river by James Prinsep, 1832. Tarakeshwar temple on the left.
.

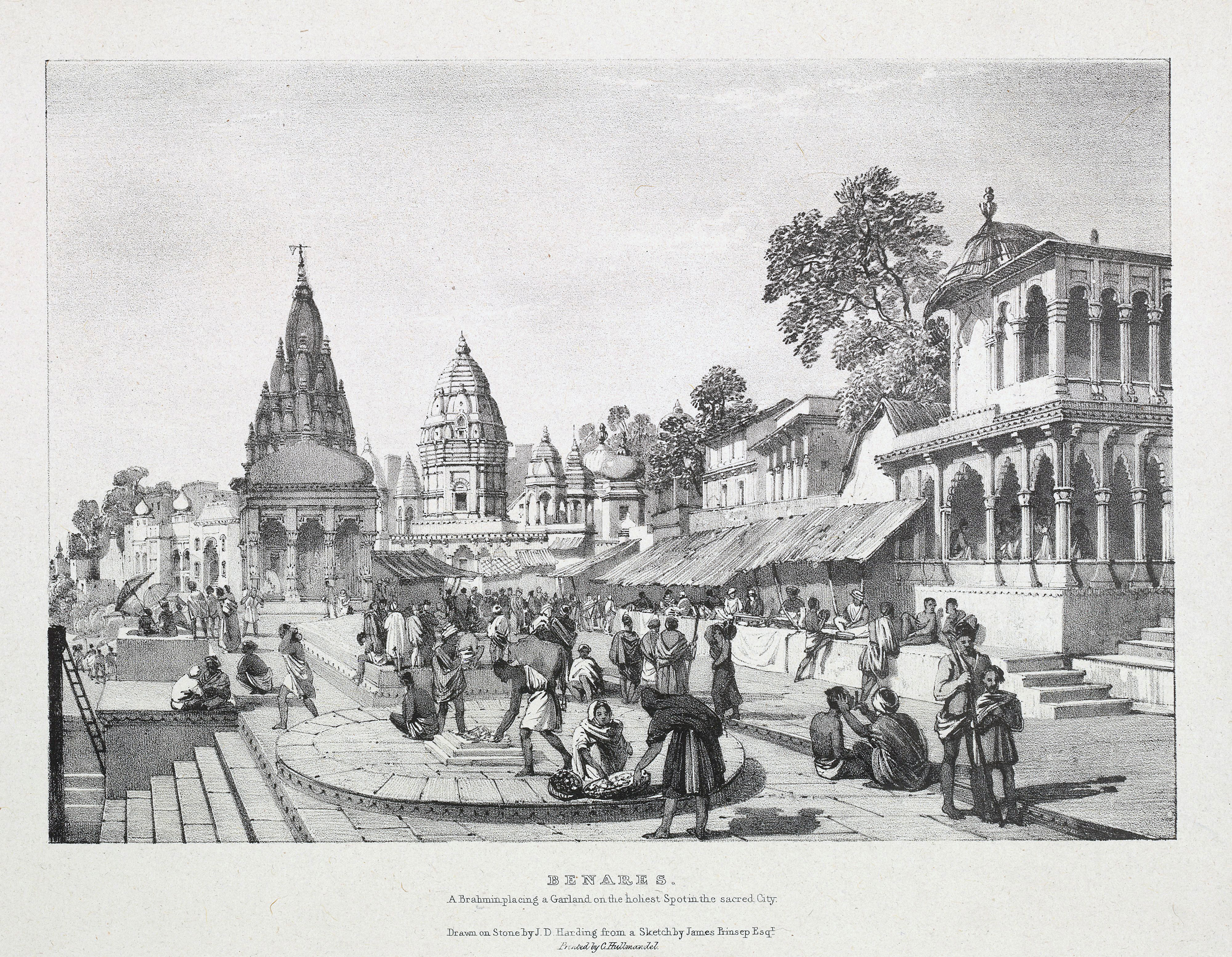
A Brahmin placing a garland on the holiest spot in the sacred city by James Prinsep 1832. Tarakeshwar temple on the left and Baba Mashan Nath temple in the center.
.

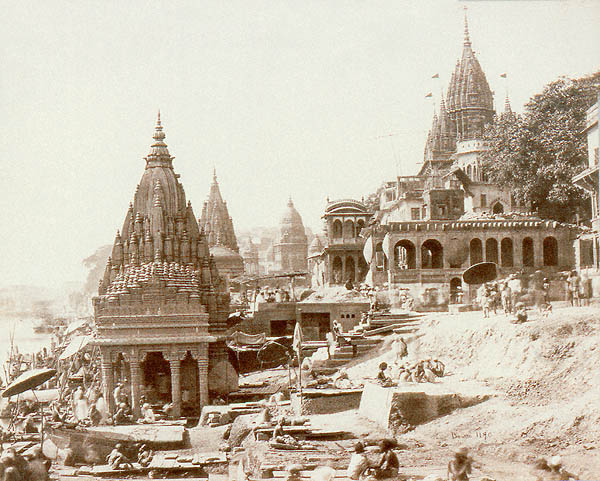
Vishnu Pud and Other Temples near the Burning Gat, Benares. Acquired by King Edward VII when Prince of Wales, 1865. The ghats are apparently under construction.

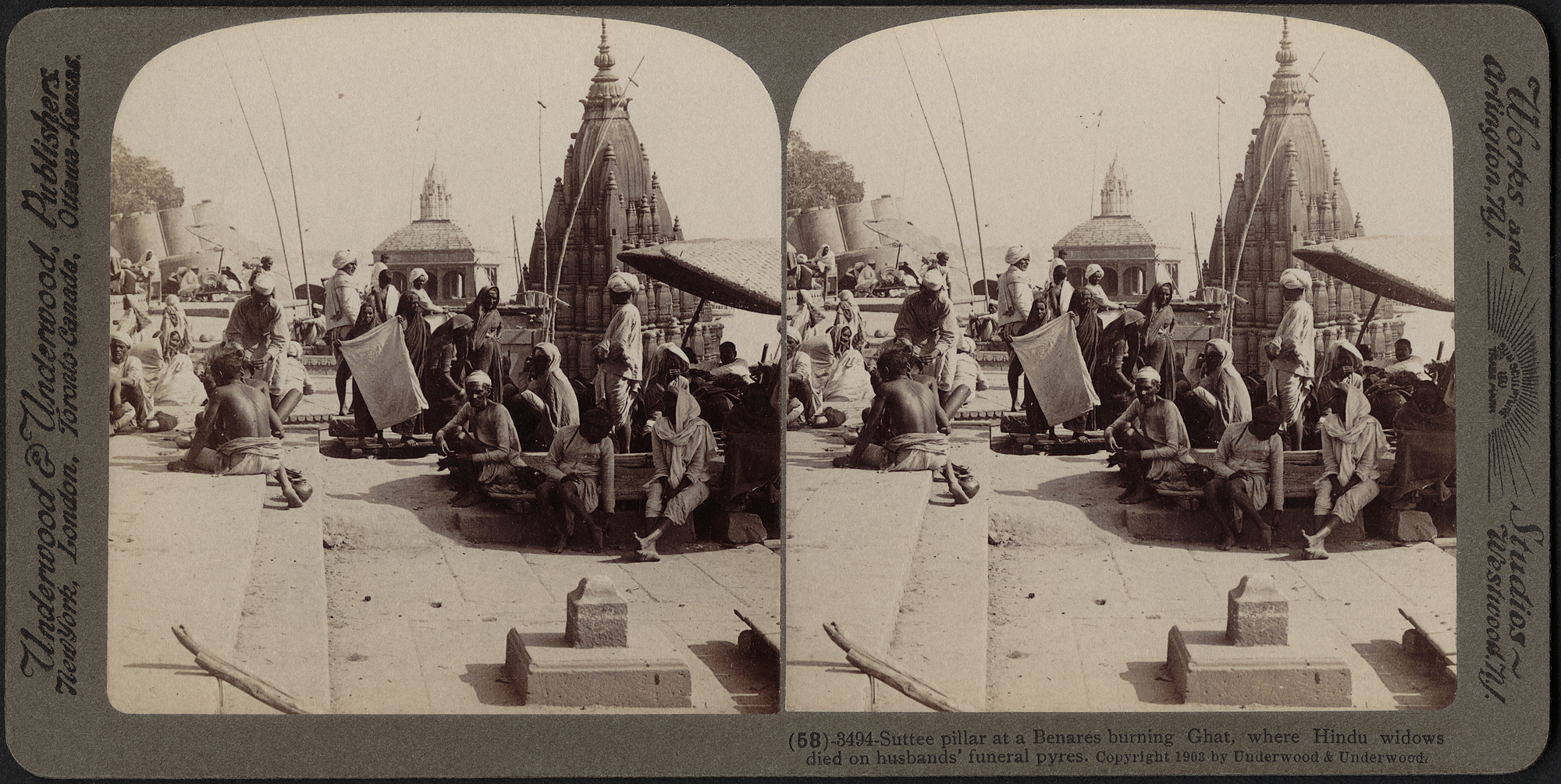
"Suttee" pillar, 1903 Stereograph
.

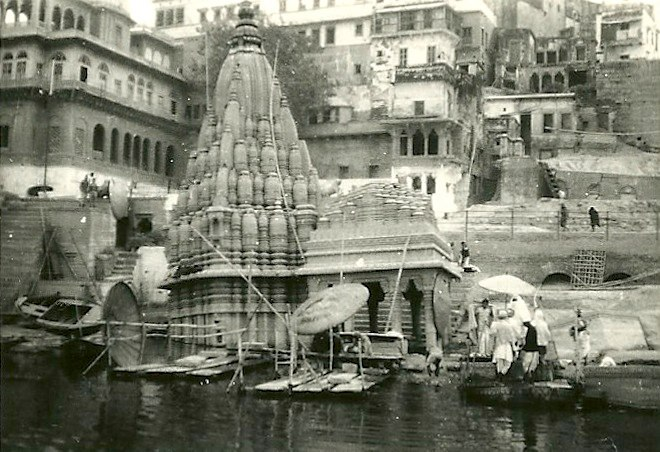
1953

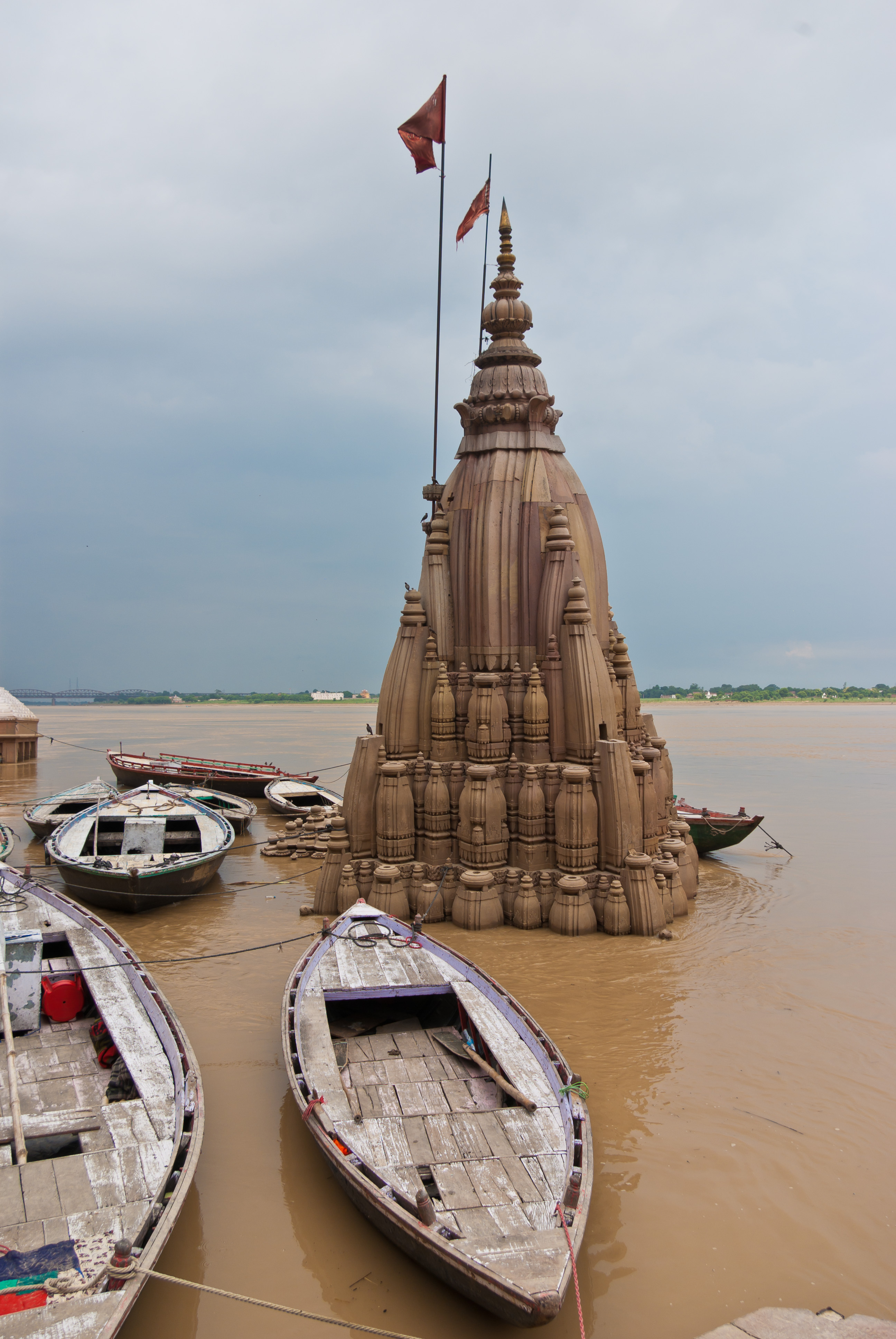
Submerged temple, 2011. Taken from an angle that does not show the lean.

== See also ==
- Kashi Vishwanath Temple
- Shree Ratneshwar Mahadev Temple, Karachi
- Hindu temples in Varanasi
- Shree Kashi Karvat Mandir
