= PHOOL =

Indian e-commerce company

Phool.co
- Company type: Private
- Founded: 2017
- Headquarters: Kanpur, India
- Key people: Ankit Agarwal (CEO)
- Website: phool.co

Phool is an Indian biomaterials startup co-founded by Ankit Agarwal and Prateek Kumar in 2017 to collect temple flower waste dumped in rivers in Kanpur. It use flowers from temples across India's and create useful products such as rose incense cone, Phool vermicompost. Phool is a brand owned by Kanpur Flowercyling Private Limited founded in 2017. In the first four years, over 11,060 metric tonnes of temple waste was recycled. The company has recently been split into the companies HelpUsGreen and Phool.

== History ==
An idea of recycling flowers started when Ankit Agarwal and Prateek Kumar visited Ghats of River Ganga and realized the danger of temple flowers containing pesticides and insecticides. They planned to meet temple waste management and pitch their idea of recycling flowers. After a year and half of research product like incense cone and vermicompost started.

Agarwal, was working with a consumer software company, Symantec, as an automation scientist. Kumar worked as an environmental engineer with Apollo Tyres. Besides helping clean the rivers, the company provides employment to over 300 marginalised women.

== Products ==
Florafoam is a product which is completely decomposable in environment after its use and purely made of flowers. It is alternative to thermocol which takes years to decompose. Florafoam chosen in Amazon stores India.

It also make vegan leather products. Named as Fleather, they are made from floral waste collected from temples across India.

== Process ==
Every week, the company collects over 21 tonnes of floral waste from temples in cities like Ayodhya, Varanasi, Bodh Gaya, and Badrinath. It processes the waste into incense and leather products.

== Awards ==
- The 2018 World Changing Idea.
- Unilever Young Entrepreneur Award.
- Spirit of Manufacturing Awards.
- PETA's Best Innovation Award.
