= Help Us Green =

Indian social enterprise

HelpUsGreen
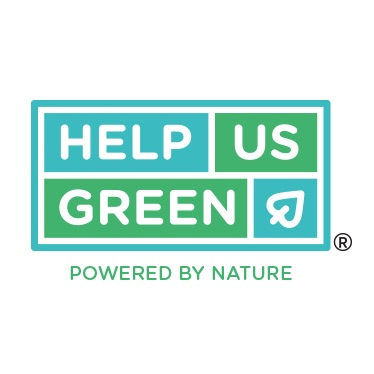
- Founded: 2015
- Headquarters: Kanpur, India
- Area served: India
- Website: helpusgreen.com

HelpUsGreen is a social enterprise based out of Kanpur, India founded in 2015 that preserves the Ganges by flowercycling the waste from the places of worship and converts them into patented lifestyle products with the help of rural women enabling circular economy. The company was founded in 2015 by Karan Rastogi and Ankit Agarwal. In 2019, the founders split mutually and formed 2 individual companies. Help Us Green LLP is owned by Mr. Karan Rastogi.

== Work ==
The company collects 2.4 tons of floral waste from temples and mosques in Uttar Pradesh, India on a daily basis recycles these floral wastes into charcoal-free and bambooless incense, that helps in managing the floral refuse in the river and also helping in reviving The Ganges. HelpUsGreen is also in the process of developing methods of converting the waste flowers to bio-ethanol.

== Awards ==
List of Awards:

1. United Nations Young Leader for sustainable Developmental Goals 2018
2. United Nations Momentum of Change Award, Poland 2018
3. Fast company world changing Ideas 2018
4. Forbes 30 under 30 2018
5. Unilever Young Entrepreneur award 2017
6. TiE UP Entrepreneur of the year 2017
7. TiE Global Spirit for of Manufacturing for Social Impact 2016
8. UNEP Young champions of Earth 2017 (Asia-Pacific)
9. Gifted Citizen 2017 by Ciudad le das Ideas Mexico 2017
10. DBS NUS Social enterprise winner 2017
11. Wharton India Economic Forum People's Choice Award 2017
12. Winner of the Tata Social Enterprise challenge 2016
13. ISB iDiya challenge 2015
14. IIM Indore Kalpvriksha 2016,
15. IIM Ahmadabad 2017 Masterplan
16. IIT Kanpur UpStart Biz 2015
17. Vilgro Unconvention New Delhi 2016
18. IIT Kharagpur Empressario 2017
