= Shree Kashi Karvat Mandir =

Hindu temple

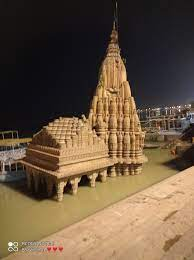

The Shri Kashi Karvat Mandir (or Kashi Karont) is one of the Dwadesh Jyotirlingas temple. It is a few meters away from Kashi Vishwanath Temple. It is an ancient Shiva temple. It is an important temple and visited by many Hindu devotees who visit Kashi Vishwanant Temple.

In ancient times the temple used to have a saw (Karont or Karvat). Before British period, people used to come there and throw themselves down the hole and blade, thus killing themselves. They are believed to go straight to heaven. There have also been many stories that claim that later the priests started scaring the pilgrims and throwing them with blades, robbing them of their valuables. And the dead bodies were thrown into the Ganges through a secret canal in the basement. The crypt is now confined to the priests and their families, who have been caring for it for the last 25 generations, and Karvat was taken to UK by the British people.

== History ==
The religious teachers of the Hindu religion tell the sadhana seekers society that scripture is not certified. Due to this, the sadhaks did not get any benefit from God, which was expected from devotion.

The religious leaders of Kashi devised a reprehensible and criminal plan. Lord Shiva had decreed that the gates of heaven would open for anyone who sacrificed their life in the city of Kashi, granting them unhindered access to paradise. The karvat (saw) at Shree Kashi Karvat Mandir became infamous as an instrument of this fatal form of “liberation.” Eventually, the British authorities intervened, and the saw was removed. Bhagat Kabir’s shabad in the Sri Guru Granth Sahib also references the karvat: Karvatu bhalā na karvaṭ tērī॥

One who dies in Maghar Nagar (near Gorakhpur in Uttar Pradesh presently in District- Sant Kabir Nagar (Uttar Pradesh), will go to hell or get the body of a donkey.

Due to the misconception that one who dies in Maghar will go straight to the birth of a pig, that is, hell, and those who die in Kashi will go straight to heaven. That's why everyone used to spend their last days in Kashi only.

The people of the surrounding villages used to hand over their parents to the selfish Pandit in Kashi in their old age. They used to keep them on a rental basis. Then gradually, the number of older people increased, so the selfish Pandits and priests started worrying that if one could not be served, how would they serve them all? Then to kill them forcefully, they made a huge brick cave on the banks of the river Ganga and then got a saw-like object installed in the middle of that cave, which the people of that time used to call Karont. Then those older people were told that whoever wanted to go to heaven soon should get his head cut off by Karont in this cave; he would go straight to heaven. This is Guruji's order; after saying this, all the elders were already troubled by sorrow and pain, so they all said yes to getting rid of this sorrowful life. And everyone was beheaded one by one. Whenever that saw got stuck, the older adult would be told that God's order had not yet been given to him. Then that older adult would go back, crying, and after some time, again provide fees to the priests to get the head cut off from Karont. One of the Holy scripture of Hinduism, Bhagavad Gita, explains in Chapter 17 Verse 23 that one can only attain salvation only after taking the actual mantras of the Almighty God given by a complete saint. In this way, the number of those older adults served by religious leaders was reduced cruelly.

Prior to all this, the monument was household of an Ahir Sardar.

== Architecture ==
A plaque at the small gate in bright maroon and yellow colours says "Only followers of Sanatana Dharma are allowed to enter". The interior has been redone with Tylo. There is a small hole inside the temple from where you can see the Shiv ling in the basement. In the basement, where you can see the Shivalinga, it is said that in ancient times there was placed a saw (Karvat or Ara), which was suspended from the ceiling of the temple and was believed to spontaneously fall on those chosen by the Lord Shiva, for his blessings. Since suicide is not allowed in Hinduism, the act was arranged with the help of a priest. Gradually this practice was banned, and saws were removed from the room.

== See also ==
- Varanasi (historically known as "Kashi")
- Kashi Vishwanath Temple
- Shri Vishwanath Mandir
