= Manikarnika Ghat =

Hindu shrine and open crematorium

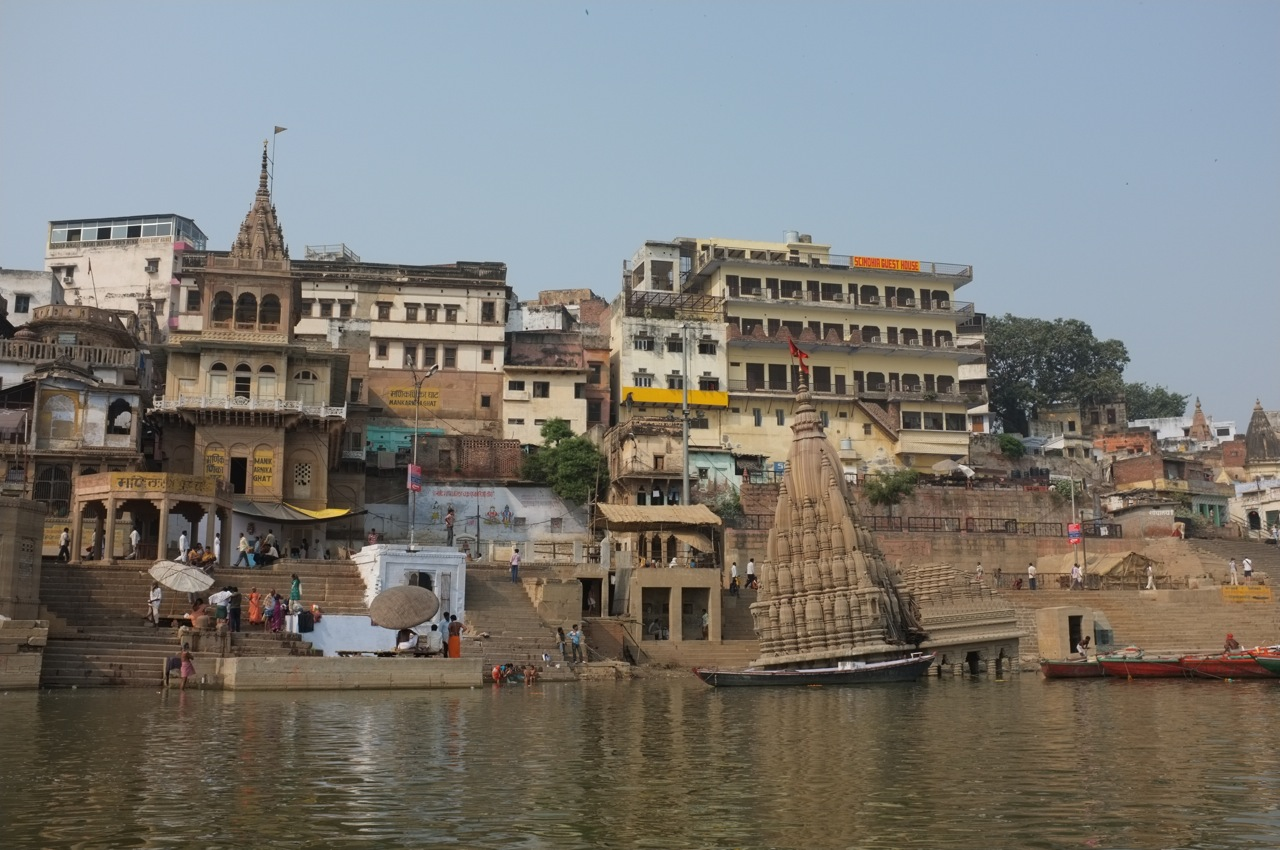

Religion
- Affiliation: Hinduism

Location
- Location: Varanasi
- State: Uttar Pradesh
- Country: India
- Interactive map of Manikarnika Ghat
- Coordinates: 25°18′39.134″N 83°0′50.708″E

Manikarnika Ghat (Hindi: मणिकर्णिका घाट) is one of the oldest and sacred ghats on the banks of the River Ganges, in the city of Varanasi in the Indian state of Uttar Pradesh. It is included in the 84 ghats of Varanasi.

It is widely known as a Varanasi's principal cremation ground (Maha-Smashaan), while also serving as a sacred pilgrimage site (Maha-Tirth) for performing Hindu rituals and ceremonies. In Hinduism it is believed that a human's soul attains moksha when cremated here.

According to a legend the ghat is named after the earrings of Sati, a Hindu goddess, which is believed to have fallen there. Another legend in the Kashi Khand states that Shiva's earring fell into the nearby kund created by Vishnu, thus the name.

== Location ==
Manikarnika Ghat is located on the left bank of River Ganges, situated midway between the confluence of River Assi and River Ganges which marks the southern boundary of the city and the confluence of the River Varuna and River Ganges, which marks the northern boundary of the city of Varanasi in Uttar Pradesh. The Dashashwamedh Ghat is located to its south and Panchganga Ghat on its north.

Generally in India, the cremation grounds are at the periphery of the city, while in Kashi this cremation ghat is at a focal point. Kashi is known as the 'nabhi' (navel) of the India, and thus with its location Manikarnika Ghat is 'nabhi' of Kashi.

== Etymology and history ==
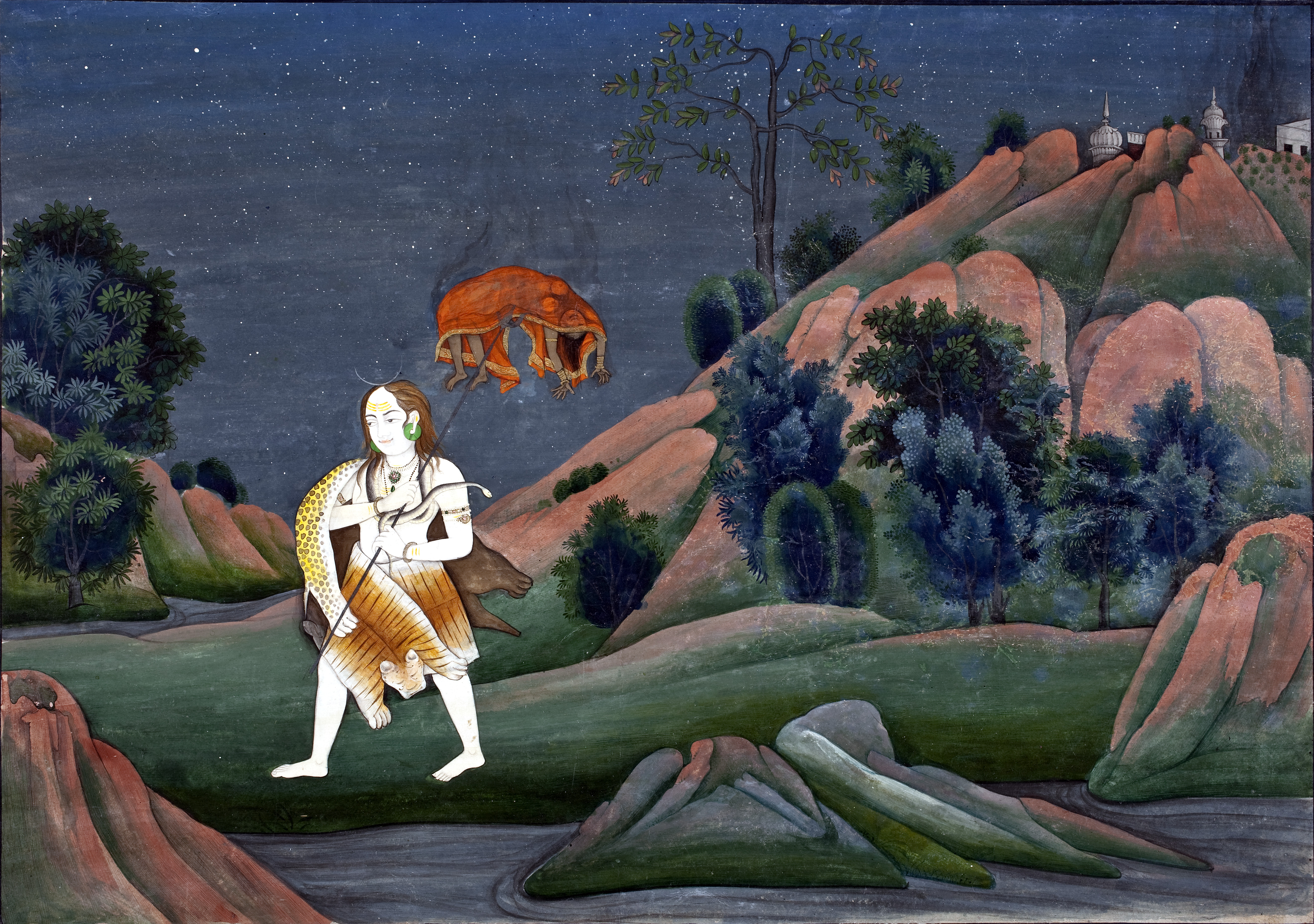
Shiva carrying the corpse of Sati Devi

The name Manikarnika means jewel ('mani') of the ear ('karnika').

According to the Kashi Khand (of Skanda Purana), Vishnu dug a well with his discus (Sudarshana Chakra) and filled it with his perspiration from the austerities he performed on its side for 50,000 years (for the creation of the universe). Shiva and Parvati came to see it and in his delightful tremble his earring fell into the well. Pleased by Vishnu's austerities, Shiva gave Vishnu a boon. Vishnu asked for only one boon, that the couple always behold there and since Shiva's earring studded with 'mukta' (pearl) had fallen there, the place should grant 'mukti' or moksh (liberation) to all. The Manikarnika-Chakra-Pushkarini kund (also known as Adi Manikarnika Tirth) is still located at the Manikarnika Ghat.

According to another legend, Shiva and Parvati were sitting beside the well, and Parvati's earring fell into the well, so Shiva named the well on the ornament as 'Manikarnika' kund.

Manikarnika Ghat was the first stone ghat to be built in 1372 AD by two king brothers and this is also evident from the earliest inscriptions on the Ghat. Later in the 18th century (1735), Bajirao Peshwa supported the re-construction on the ghat. It is also believed that Devi Ahilyabai Holkar in 1791 supported its re-construction. She also funded the construction of a temple and a screened off bathing area for women (never completed) called Zenana ghat. Another reconstruction of the ghat was completed in 1912, which involved raising the platform of the ghat above flood level by Raja (Sir) Moti Chand.

== Religious significance ==
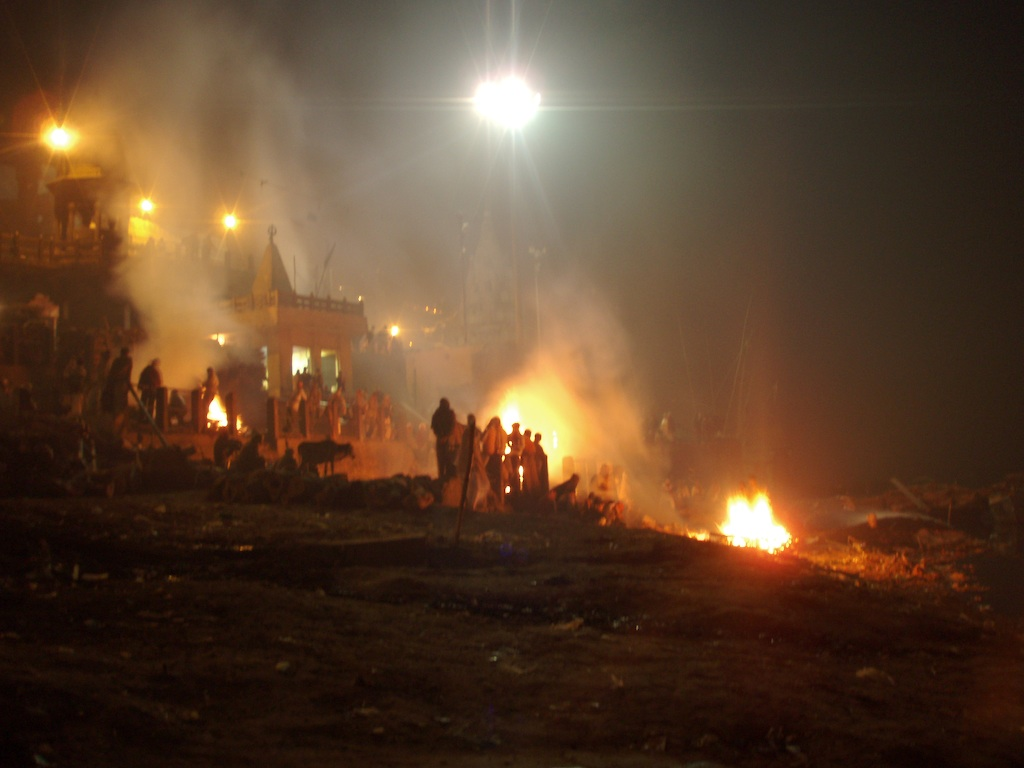
Cremations at Manikarnika Ghat

Manikarnika Ghat and Harishchandra Ghat serve as the principal cremation ground (Maha-Smashaan) for Hindus. In addition, it also serves as a sacred pilgrimage site (Maha-Tirth) for performing Hindu rituals and ceremonies. Due to its religious significance, it is included in the 84 ghats of Varanasi.

According to orthodox Brahman specialists, a person attains liberation only when they die in Kashi, while others believe that liberation is attained by even cremating one in Kashi, as a person's pran (soul) is said to leave the body when the chief-mourner cracks open the skull of the half cremated body in the pyre. As a part of the cremation ceremony, the Dom (funeral attendant) provides the chief-mourner with the never-extinguishing fire from the ghat to light the pyre. It is sometimes claimed that without this fire there is no 'liberation'. Even when families do not take this fire, a tax is paid to the attendant called Doms' tax. The fire of the pyres at this ghat never cools down, as bodies keep coming here for cremation.

An afternoon bath at the ghat carries religious merits. It is also here that the devotees begin and end the Panchkoshi Parikrama yatra.

=== Adjacent religious places ===
- Chakra-Pushkarani, a tank built by Vishnu where the earring of Shiva fell, leading to the tirth being called Manikarnika.
- Vishnu Paduka, the footsteps of Vishnu set in marble. This is the place where Vishnu engaged in years of tapa.
- Tarakeshwar Mahadev temple built in the 18th century under the patronage of Devi Ahilyabai Holka, it is built in the garbhagriha (sanctum) and ardha-mandap (half-hall) style.
- Amethi Shiva temple built in Panchavatna style of architecture.
- Ratneshwar Mahadev temple built with a garbhgriha, mandapa and ardha-mandapa, with elaborate carvings on the exterior walls. The temple has partly submerged in water.
- Manmandir was built by in the beginning of 17th century by Raja Mansingh of Amber. An observatory was built on top of the Manmandir by Raja Savai Jaisingh. The Manmandir observatory houses a samrat-yantra (giant sundial), nadivalaya-yantra, chakra-yantra and digansh-yantra.

== See also ==
- Ghats in Varanasi
