= Banaras Hindu University =

Public university in Varanasi, Uttar Pradesh, India

- Kashi Hindu Vishwavidyalaya
- Official seal of BHU
- Other name: BHU
- Former name: Benares Hindu University
- Motto: IAST: Vidyāyā'mr̥tamaśnute
- Motto in English: "Knowledge imparts immortality"
- Type: Public research university
- Established: 4 February 1916; 110 years ago
- Founders: Annie Besant; Madan Mohan Malaviya; Rameshwar Singh; Prabhu Narayan Singh; Sunder Lal
- Academic affiliations: AIU; NMC; UGC; ICAR; BCI
- Budget: ₹1,808.75 crore (US$190 million)
- Chancellor: Vacant
- Vice-Chancellor: Ajit Kumar Chaturvedi
- Visitor: President of India
- Students: 30,698
- Undergraduates: 15,746
- Postgraduates: 7,557
- Doctoral students: 4,555
- Location: Varanasi, Uttar Pradesh, India; 25.2677°N 82.9891°E
- Campus: Urban, 1,300 acres (530 ha)
- Language: Hindi, English
- Anthem: Kulgeet - Madhur Manohar
- Colours: BHU Saffron, BHU Blue, BHU Grey/Silver
- Mascots: Goddess Saraswati (Learning and Wisdom)
- Website: bhu.ac.in

Banaras Hindu University (BHU), formerly Benares Hindu University, is a collegiate, central, and research university located in Varanasi, Uttar Pradesh, India, and founded in 1916. It is ranked amongst the most prestigious universities of the country. The university incorporated the Central Hindu College, which had been founded by theosophist and future Indian Home Rule leader Annie Besant in 1898. By December 1911, Annie Besant and the Theosophists had relinquished day-to-day control of the Central Hindu College to Madan Mohan Malaviya and others, who emphasised a more orthodox Hindu education, preserving traditional practices such as the hereditary caste system, in contrast to Besant's Theosophical vision. Five years later Malaviya established the university with the support of the maharaja of Darbhanga Rameshwar Singh, the maharaja of Benares Prabhu Narayan Singh, and the lawyer Sunder Lal.

With over 30,000 students, and 18,000 residing on campus, BHU is the largest residential university in Asia. The university is one of the eight public institutions declared as an Institute of Eminence by the Government of India. It is also one of the 12 institutions from India in BRICS Universities League, a consortium of leading research universities from BRICS countries. The university's main campus spread over 1,370 acres (5.5 km^{2}), was built on land donated by Prabhu Narayan Singh, the hereditary ruler of Benares State. The south campus, spread over 2,700 acres (11 km^{2}) is built on land donated later by Aditya Narayan Singh in Sunderpur, hosts the Krishi Vigyan Kendra (Agriculture Science Centre) and is located in Barkachha in Mirzapur district, about 60 km (37 mi) from Varanasi.

BHU is organised into six institutes, 14 faculties (streams) and about 140 departments. As of 2020, the total student enrolment at the university is 30,698 coming from 48 countries. The university's engineering institute was designated as an Indian Institute of Technology in June 2012, and henceforth is Indian Institute of Technology (BHU). Centralised in 1916 through the Banaras Hindu University Act, Banaras Hindu University is India's first central university. BHU celebrated its centenary year in 2015–2016.

BHU has over 65 hostels for resident students. Several of its faculties and institutes include Arts, Social Sciences, Commerce, Management Studies, Science, Performing Arts, Law, Agricultural Science, Medical Science, and Environment and Sustainable Development along with departments of Linguistics, Journalism & Mass Communication, among others. It is an Institute of National Importance since the inception of the Constitution of India. In 2024, the National Institutional Ranking Framework (NIRF) ranked the BHU 5th in its top Indian universities ranking.

== History ==
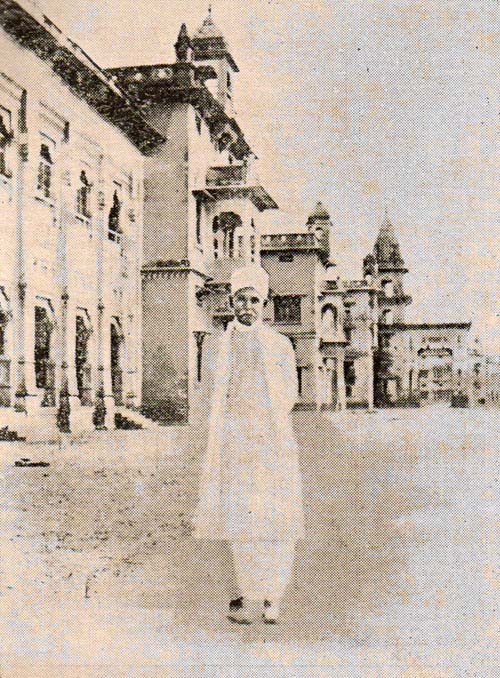
Madan Mohan Malviya at the university

The Banaras Hindu University was jointly established by Madan Mohan Malaviya, Annie Besant, Maharaja Rameshwar Singh of Darbhanga Raj and Prabhu Narayan Singh and Aditya Narayan Singh of Narayan dynasty, while the university is the brainchild of Malviya.

At the 21st Conference of the Indian National Congress in Benares in December 1905, Malaviya publicly announced his intent to establish a university in Banaras. Malaviya continued to develop his vision for the university with inputs from other Indian nationalists and educationists. He published his plan in 1911. The focus of his arguments was the prevailing poverty in India and the decline in income of Indians compared to Europeans. The plan called for the focus on technology and science, besides the study of India's religion and culture:

"The millions mired in poverty here can only get rid (of it) when science is used in their interest. Such maximum application of science is only possible when scientific knowledge is available to Indians in their own country."

-- Madan Mohan Malviya

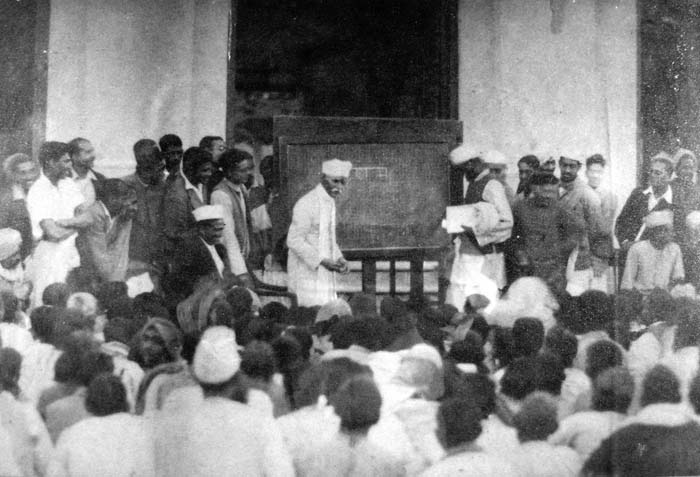
Founder Mahamana inaugurate literacy day among students

Malaviya's plan evaluated whether to seek government recognition for the university or operate without its control. He decided in favour of the former for various reasons. Malaviya also considered the question of medium of instruction and decided to start with English given the prevalent environment, and gradually add Hindi and other Indian languages. A distinguishing characteristic of Malaviya's vision was the preference for a residential university. All other Indian universities of the period, such as the universities in Bombay, Calcutta, Madras, etc., were affiliating universities which only conducted examinations and awarded degrees to students of their affiliated colleges. Malaviya had supported Annie Besant's cause and in 1903, he had raised 250,000 Rupees in donations to finance the construction of the school's hostel. In 1907 Besant had applied for a royal charter to establish a university. However, there was no response from the British government.

Following the publication of Malviya's plan, Besant met Malviya and in April 1911 they agreed to unite their forces to build the university in Varanasi.

Malaviya soon left his legal practice to focus exclusively on developing the university and his independence activities. On 22 November 1911, he registered the Hindu University Society to gather support and raise funds for building the university. He spent the next four years gathering support and raising funds for the university. Malaviya sought and received early support from the Kashi Naresh Prabhu Narayan Singh and Rameshwar Singh Bahadur of Raj Darbhanga. Thakur Jadunath Singh of Arkha along with other noble houses of United Provinces contributed for the development of the university.

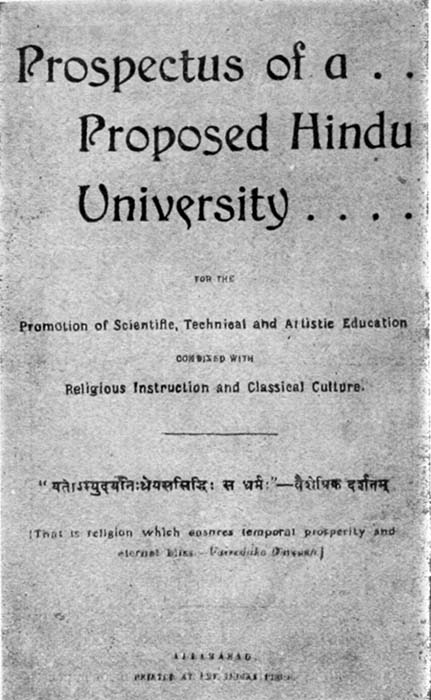
Initial prospectus of the university

On 22 March 1915, then Education Minister Harcourt Butler introduced the Benares Hindu University Bill in the Imperial Legislative Council. In his speech, he remarked about the university:

My Lord, this is no ordinary occasion. We are watching to-day the birth of a new and, many hope, a better type of University in India. The main features of this University, which distinguish it from existing Universities, will be, first, that it will be a teaching and residential University; secondly, that while it will be open to all castes and creeds, it will insist upon religious instructions for Hindus, and thirdly, that it will be conducted and managed by the Hindu community and almost entirely by non-officials.

— Harcourt Butler 11 March 1915, Imperial Legislative Council, New Delhi, India

The Benares Hindu University Bill was passed on 1 October 1915 and assented by the Viceroy and Governor-General of India on the same day.

BHU was finally established in 1916, the first university in India that was the result of people's efforts. The foundation for the main campus of the university was laid by Lord Hardinge, the then Viceroy of India, on Vasant Panchami 4 February 1916. To promote the university's expansion, Malviya invited eminent guest speakers such as Mahatma Gandhi, Jagadish Chandra Bose, C. V. Raman, Prafulla Chandra Ray, Sam Higginbottom, Patrick Geddes, and Besant to deliver a series of what are now called The University Extension Lectures between 5–8 February 1916. Gandhi's lecture on the occasion was his first public address in India.

Sunder Lal was appointed the first vice-chancellor, and the university began its academic session the same month with classes initially held at the Central Hindu School in the Kamachha area, while the campus was being built on over 1,300 acres (5.3 km^{2}) of land donated by the Kashi Naresh on the outskirts of the city. The Nizam of Hyderabad and Berar, Mir Osman Ali Khan, also made a donation to the university.

The university's anthem, called Kulgeet, was composed by university professor and eminent scientist Shanti Swarup Bhatnagar.

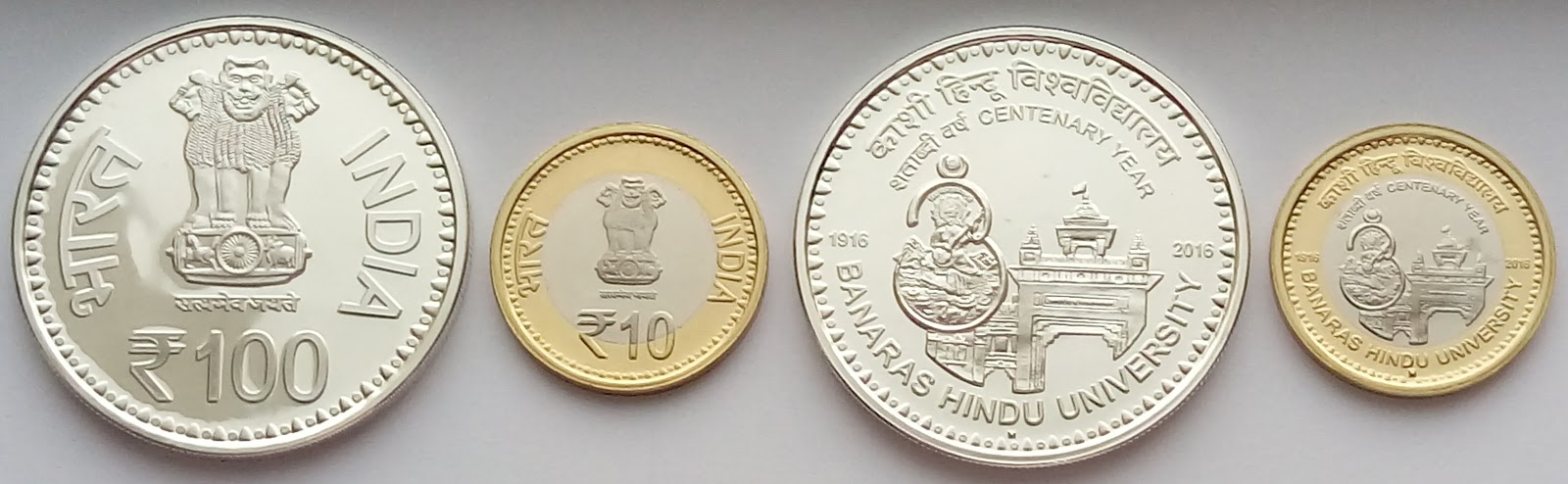
Scrollable image. Commemorative coins released on the centenary year of Banaras Hindu University
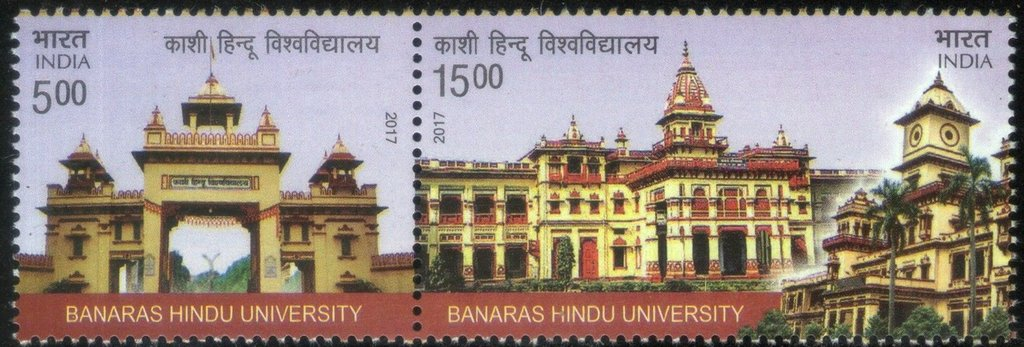
Scrollable image. Commemorative stamps released on the centenary year of Banaras Hindu University

== Campus ==
=== Main campus ===
Banaras Hindu University's main campus is located on the southern edge of Varanasi, near the banks of the river Ganges. Development of the main campus, spread over 1,370 acres (5.5 km^{2}), started in 1916 on land donated by the then Kashi Naresh Prabhu Narayan Singh. The campus layout approximates a semicircle, with intersecting roads laid out along the radii or in arcs. Buildings built in the first half of the 20th century are fine examples of Indo-Gothic architecture.

The campus has over 65 hostels offering residential accommodation for over 12,000 students. On-campus housing is also available to a majority of the full-time faculty.

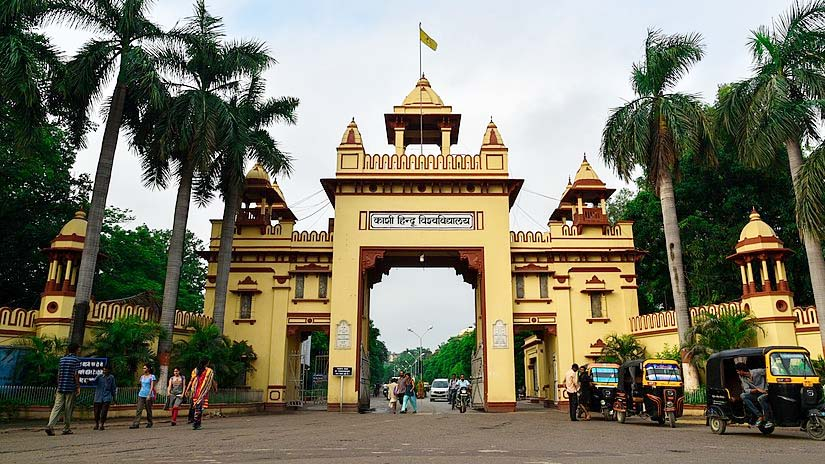
Singh Dwar, the main entrance gate to university campus

The main entrance gate and boundary wall was built on the donation made by Maharaja of Balrampur, Maharaja Pateshvari Prashad Singh, and is named after him as the Singh Dwar (transl. Singh Gate).

The Sayaji Rao Gaekwad Library is the main library on campus and houses over 1.3 million volumes as of 2011. Completed in 1941, its construction was financed by Maharaja Sayajirao Gaekwad III of Baroda. In addition to the main library, there are three institute libraries, eight faculty libraries and over 25 departmental libraries available to students and staff.

Sir Sunderlal Hospital on the campus is a teaching hospital for the Institute of Medical Sciences. Established in 1926 with 96 beds, it has since been expanded to over 900 beds and is the largest tertiary referral hospital in the region.

The most prominent landmark is the Shri Vishwanath Mandir, located in the centre of the campus. The foundation for this 252 feet (77 m) high complex of seven temples was laid in March 1931, and took almost three decades to complete.

Established in 1920, Bharat Kala Bhavan is the university museum of the Banaras Hindu University. It is situated inside the main campus of the university with over 100,000 holdings which include artifacts, paintings, philately, textiles, costumes, etc.

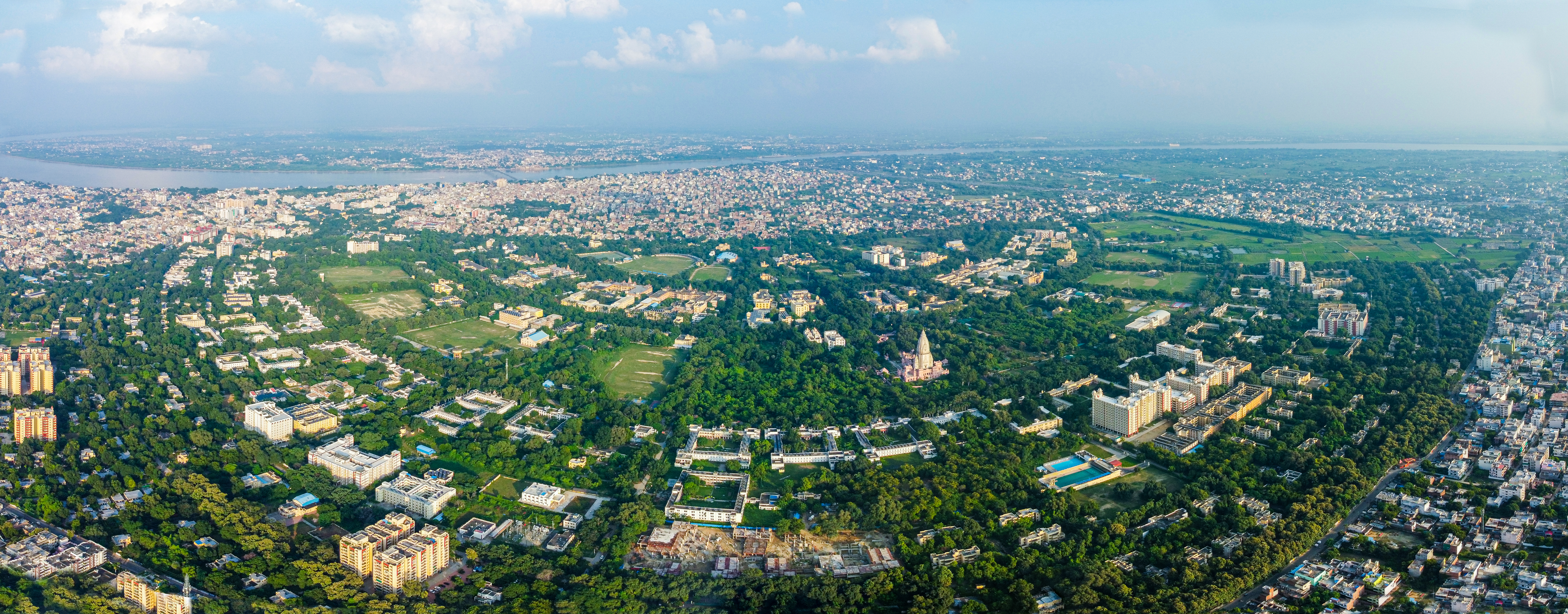
Scrollable image. Aerial view of the university.

=== Rajiv Gandhi South Campus ===
The south campus is located in Barkachha in Mirzapur district, about 60 km (37 mi) southwest of the main campus. Spread over an area of over 2,700 acres (11 km^{2}), it was transferred as a lease in perpetuity to BHU by the Bharat Mandal Trust in 1979.

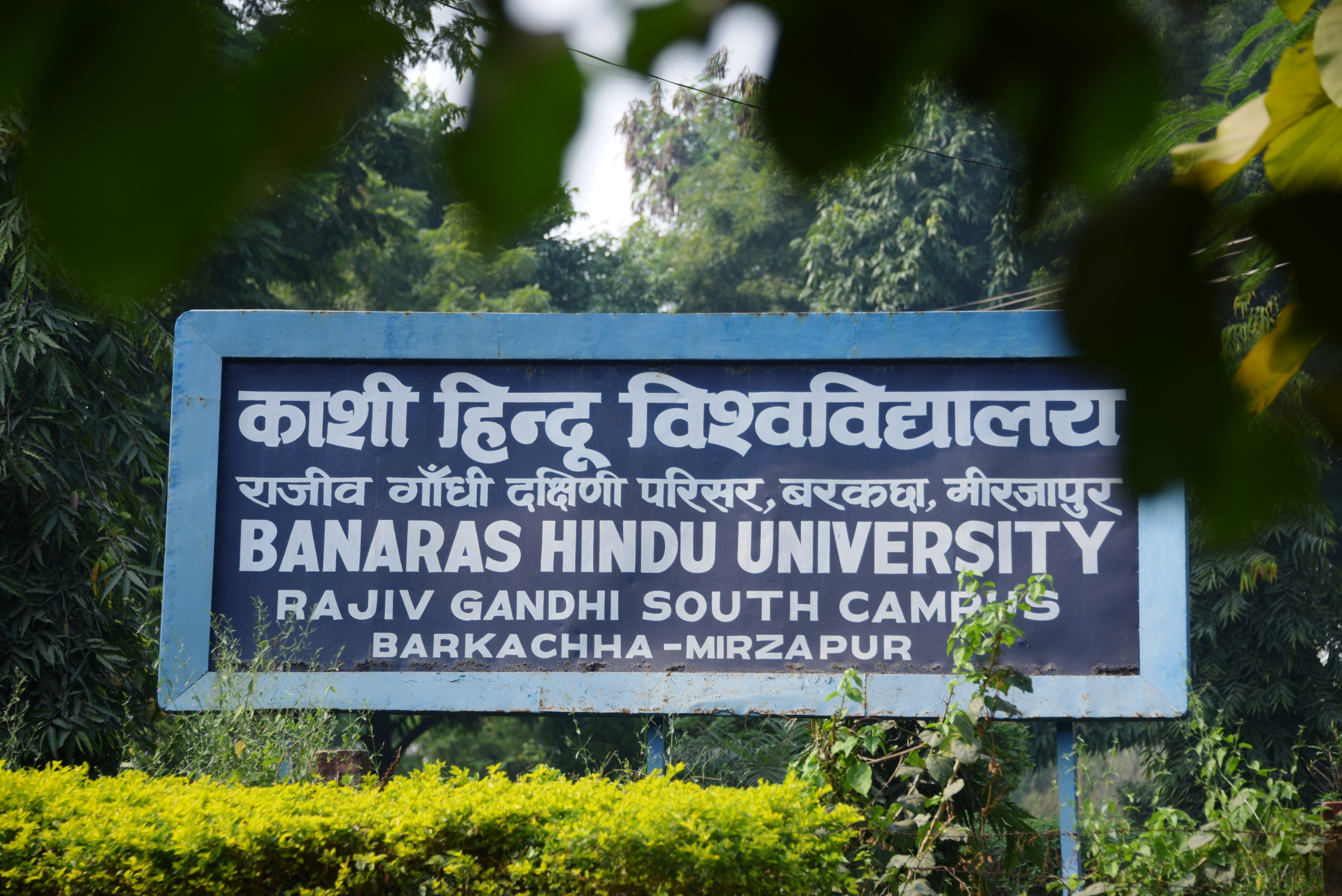
Rajiv Gandhi South Campus of the university

It hosts the Krishi Vigyan Kendra (Agricultural Science Centre), with focus on research in agricultural techniques, agro-forestry and bio-diversity appropriate to the Vindhya Range region. The South Campus features a lecture complex, library, student hostels and faculty housing, besides administrative offices.

=== Halls of residence ===
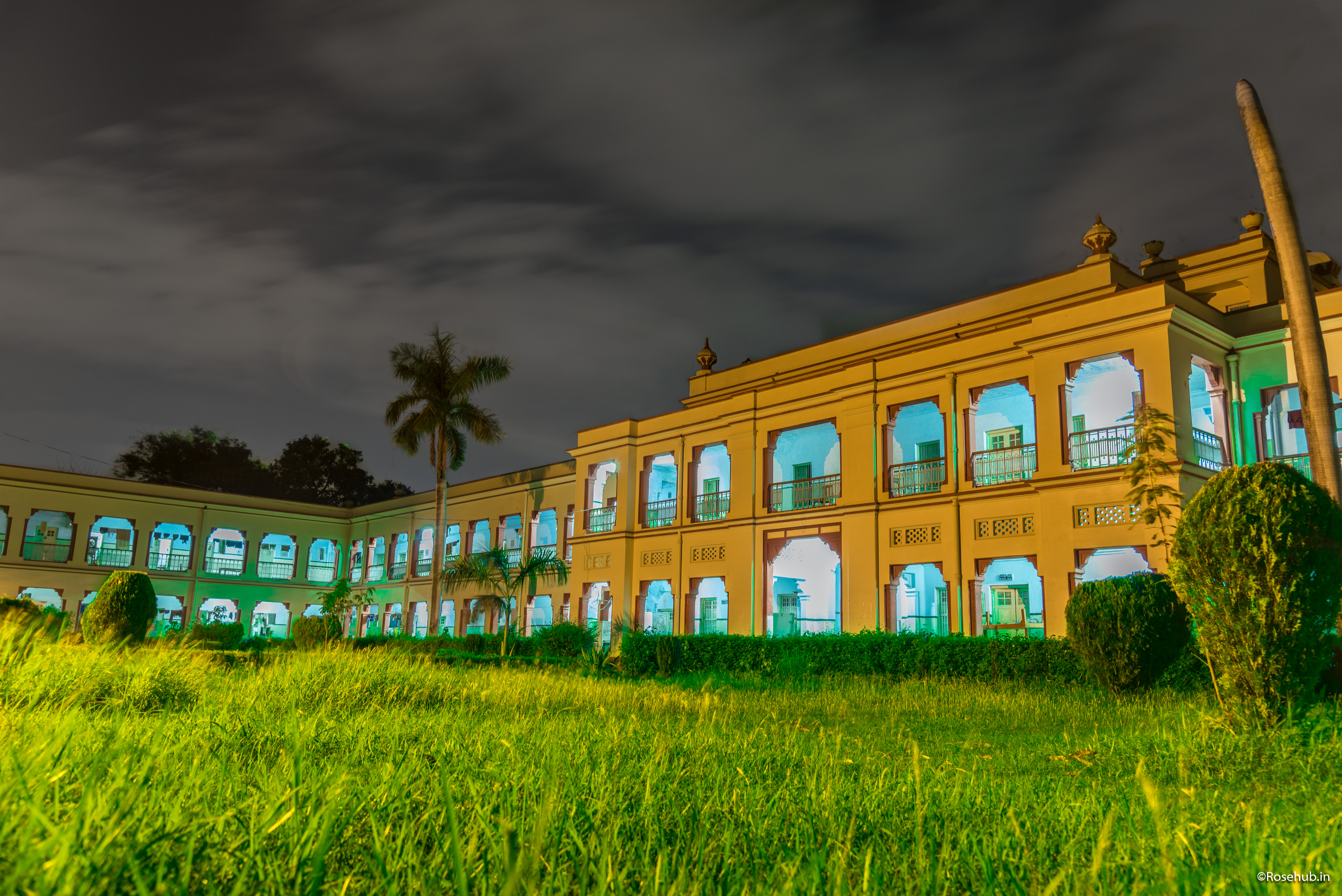
Limbdi hostel in the university

BHU is a fully residential university with a total of 66 hostels - 41 hostels for male, 21 hostels for female students, and 4 hostels for International students.

Hostels in the university are divided among different faculties, institutes, campuses, and colleges catering to their specific demands. Out of the four separate hostels for international students, two are for boys and the other two for girls.

Hostels of the university are named after several historically important figures such as Raja Baldev Das Jugal Kishore Birla, Lal Bahadur Shastri, Rani Laxmibai and M. Visvesvaraya. Some hostels are named after important rivers of India; 'Triveni' for instance was initially a cluster of three girls' hostels named after rivers Ganga, Yamuna, and Sarasvati; thereby the cluster being called after Triveni Sangam. Later, hostels named after river Godavari and Kaveri were also added to the 'Triveni' block.

BHU also provides on-campus residence to a substantial number of teaching and non-teaching staff. There are 654 quarters for teaching staff, 688 quarters for non-teaching staff.

== Organisation and administration ==
=== Governance ===
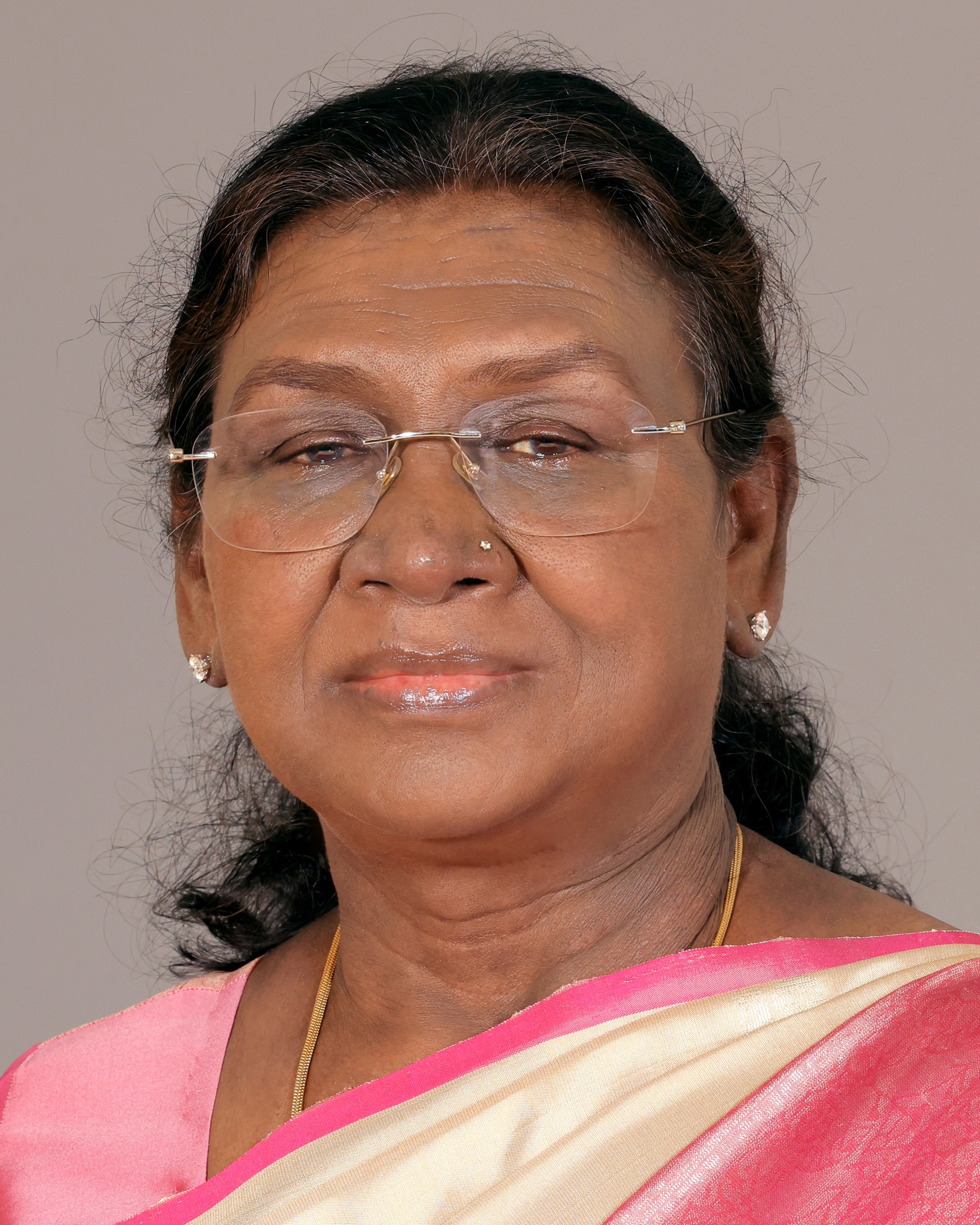
President Droupadi Murmu, Visitor of the university

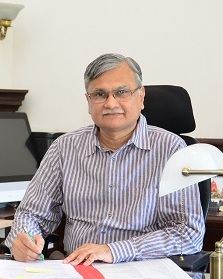
Ajit Kumar Chaturvedi, vice-chancellor of the university

The President of India (as of December 2022, Droupadi Murmu) is the visitor of the Banaras Hindu University. The university's formal head is the chancellor (currently vacant), though this is a titular figure, and is not involved with the day-to-day running of the university. The chancellor is elected by the members of the University Court. The university's chief executive is the Vice-chancellor (as of August 2025, Ajit Kumar Chaturvedi), appointed by the President of India on the recommendations of Ministry of Education which, in turn, is based on an open application process. All permanent administrative offices of the university are located in the Central Office.

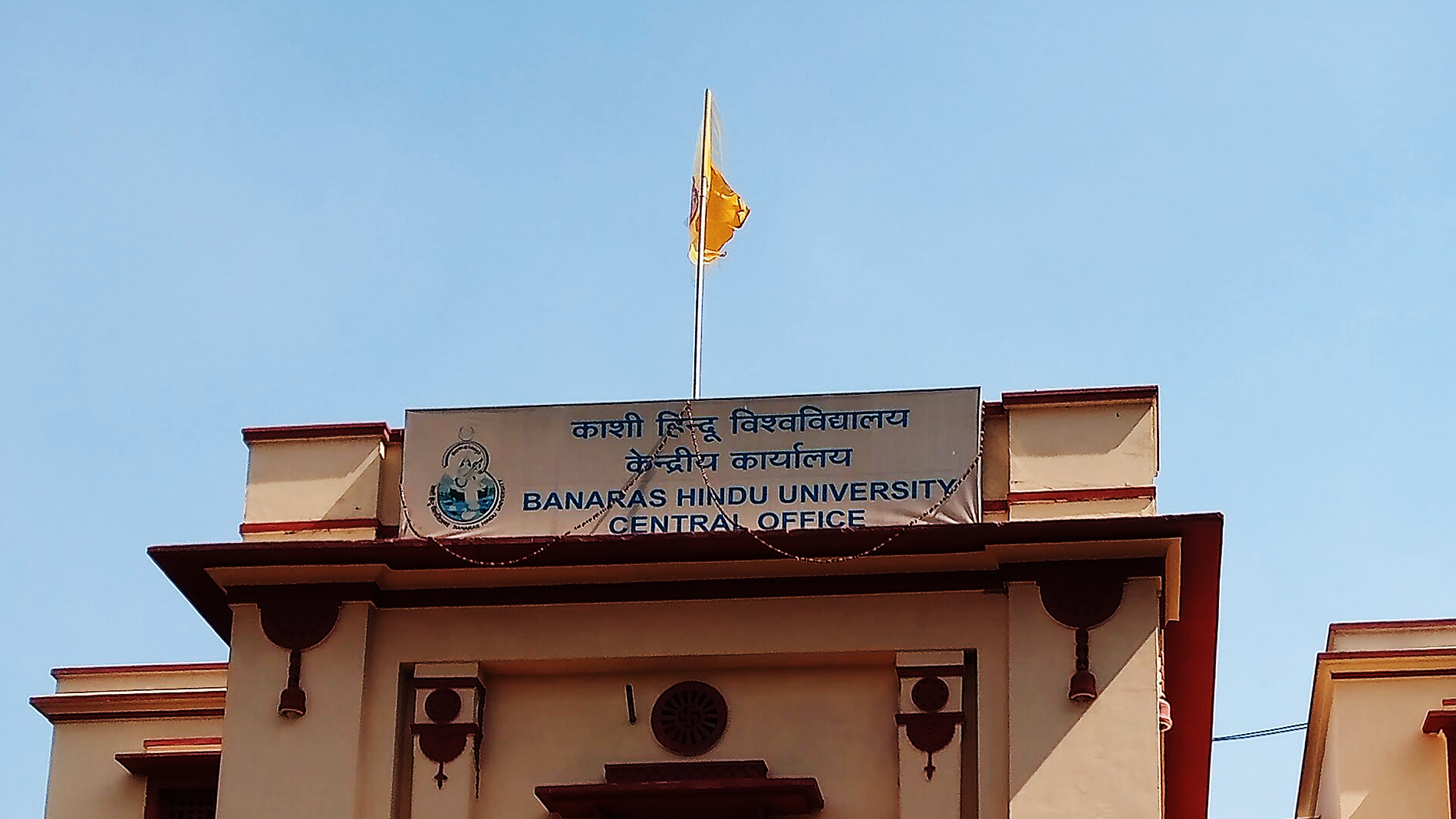
The Central Office of BHU, atop is the BHU flag at what is also known as the Central Registry.

The university is governed as per the procedures laid out in the Banaras Hindu University Act of 1915 (BHU Act), and statutes of the university. The executive council is the supreme executive governing body of the university and exercises all the powers on management and administration of the revenue, property, and administrative affairs of the university. The University Court is the supreme advisory body to the Visitor for all matters not otherwise provided for by the Banaras Hindu University Act, and the statutes. The Academic Council is the highest academic body of the university and is responsible for the maintenance of standards of instruction, education and examination within the university. It has the right to advise the executive council on all academic matters. The finance committee is responsible for recommending financial policies, goals, and budgets.

The BHU Act has clearly laid out procedure and functions of different administrative bodies of the university. All officers of the university draw their power and responsibilities from the BHU Act of 1915, and statues of the university.

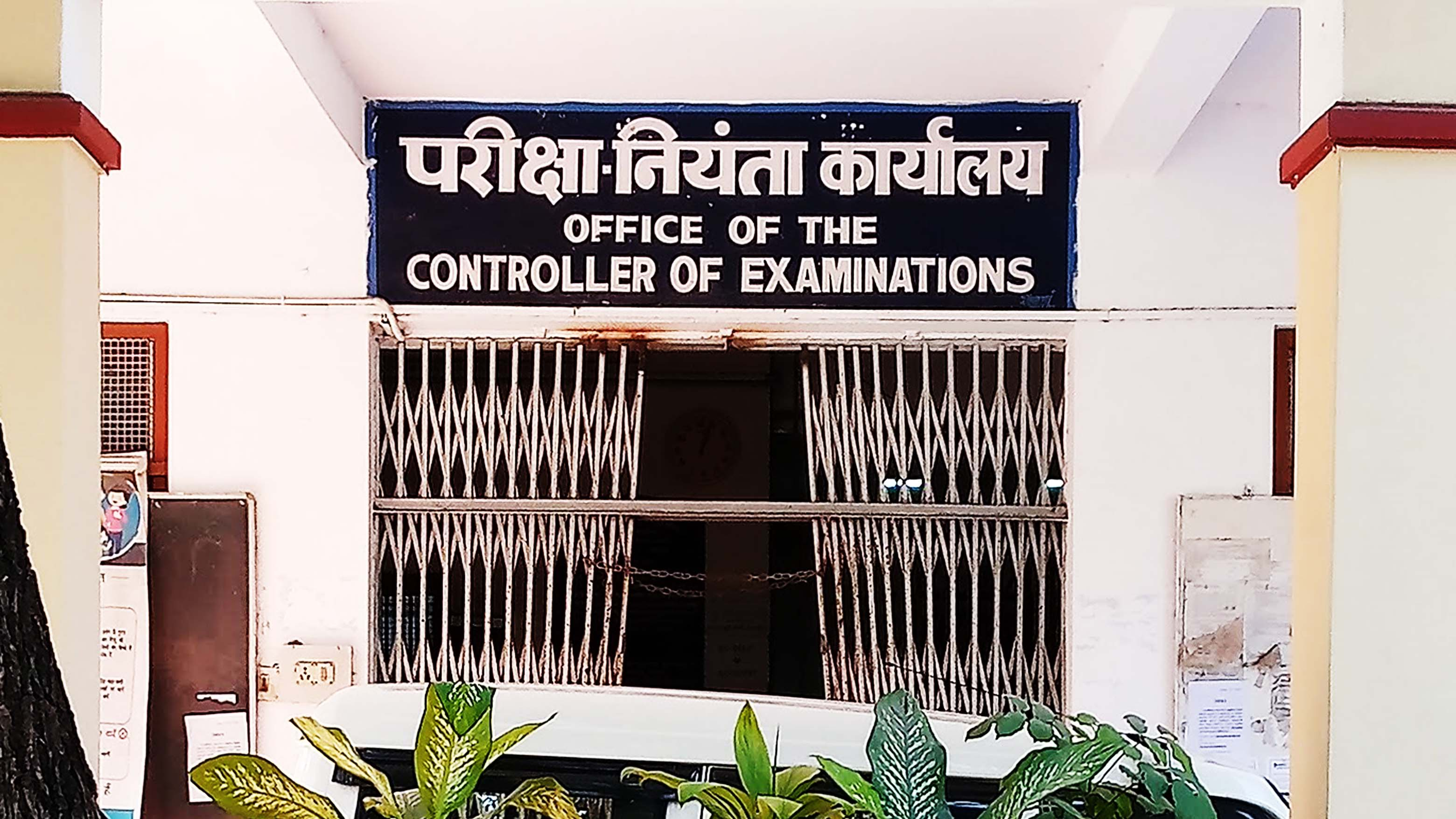
Office of the Controller of Examinations

=== University Temple ===
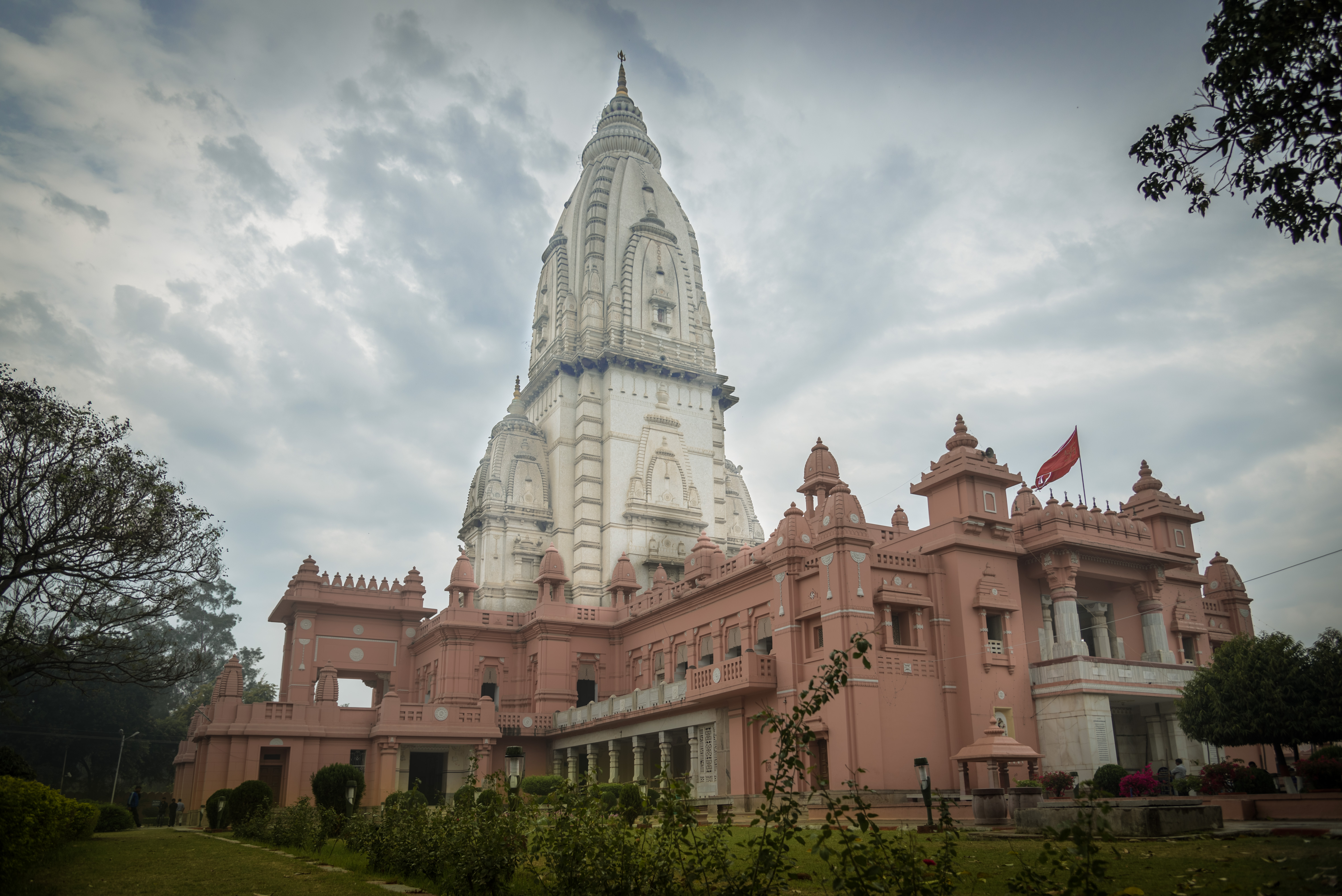
Shri Vishwanath Mandir has the tallest temple tower in the world.

The university has a university temple called Shri Vishwanath Mandir also known as Vishwanath Temple located in the center of the campus, primarily dedicated to Lord Shiva along with 8 other temples inside the main temple structure.

=== International Centre ===
BHU established International Centre, a university department, in 2004 to handle all international academic affairs such as foreign students' applications, international collaboration, international alumni outreach.

=== University Museum ===
The University Museum, Bharat Kala Bhavan, is an art and archaeological museum on the campus. Established in January 1920, its first chairman was Nobel laureate Rabindranath Tagore, with his nephew Abanindranath Tagore as the vice-chairman. The museum was expanded and gained prominence with the efforts of Rai Krishnadasa. The museum is best known for its collection of Indian paintings, but also includes archaeological artefacts, textiles and costumes, Indian philately as well as literary and archival materials. The Alice Boner Gallery was also set up at Bharat Kala Bhavan with the assistance of the Alice Boner Foundation in 1989 to mark the birth centenary of Alice Boner.

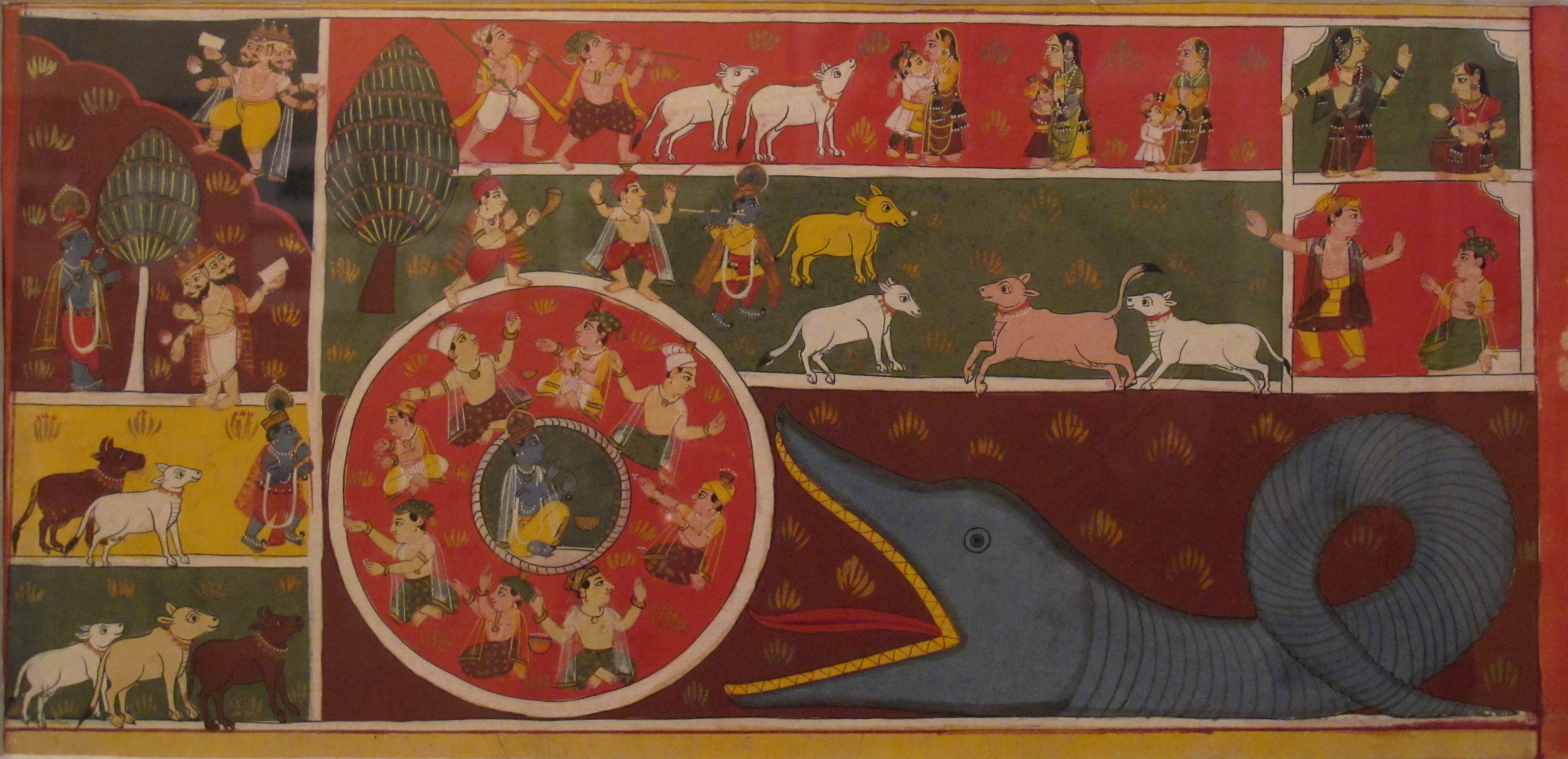
Krishna killing Aghasura, c. 1760 Malwa painting in University Museum

=== Banaras Hindu University Press ===
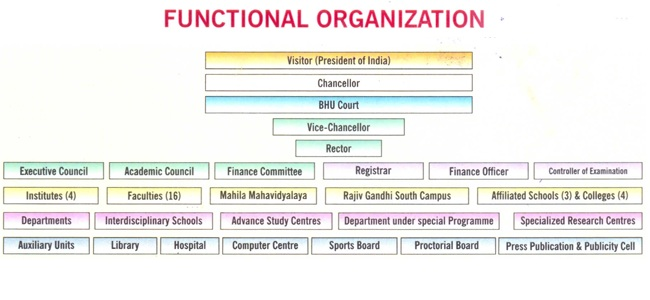
Organisation chart of the university

Established in 1936 with initial funding from Seth Jugal Kishore Birla, formally the Banaras Hindu University Press and Publication Cell, is the university press of BHU. It comprises two entities, namely BHU Press, and the Publication Cell. While the BHU press publishes books, and journals of the university, the Publication Cell looks after the sales aspect. The BHU Press also publishes Vishwa Panchang prepared by the Faculty of Sanskrit Vidya Dharma Vigyan.

== Academics ==
Academic entities in the Banaras Hindu University are divided in several types of units with varying independence and budget. Institutes are a cluster of one or more faculties; faculties are a cluster of one or more departments, departments are specifically dedicated to one subject such as political science, or mathematics, or pottery. The university also has special chairs, inter-disciplinary schools, and special centres.

=== Institutes ===
Banaras Hindu University maintains six institutes:

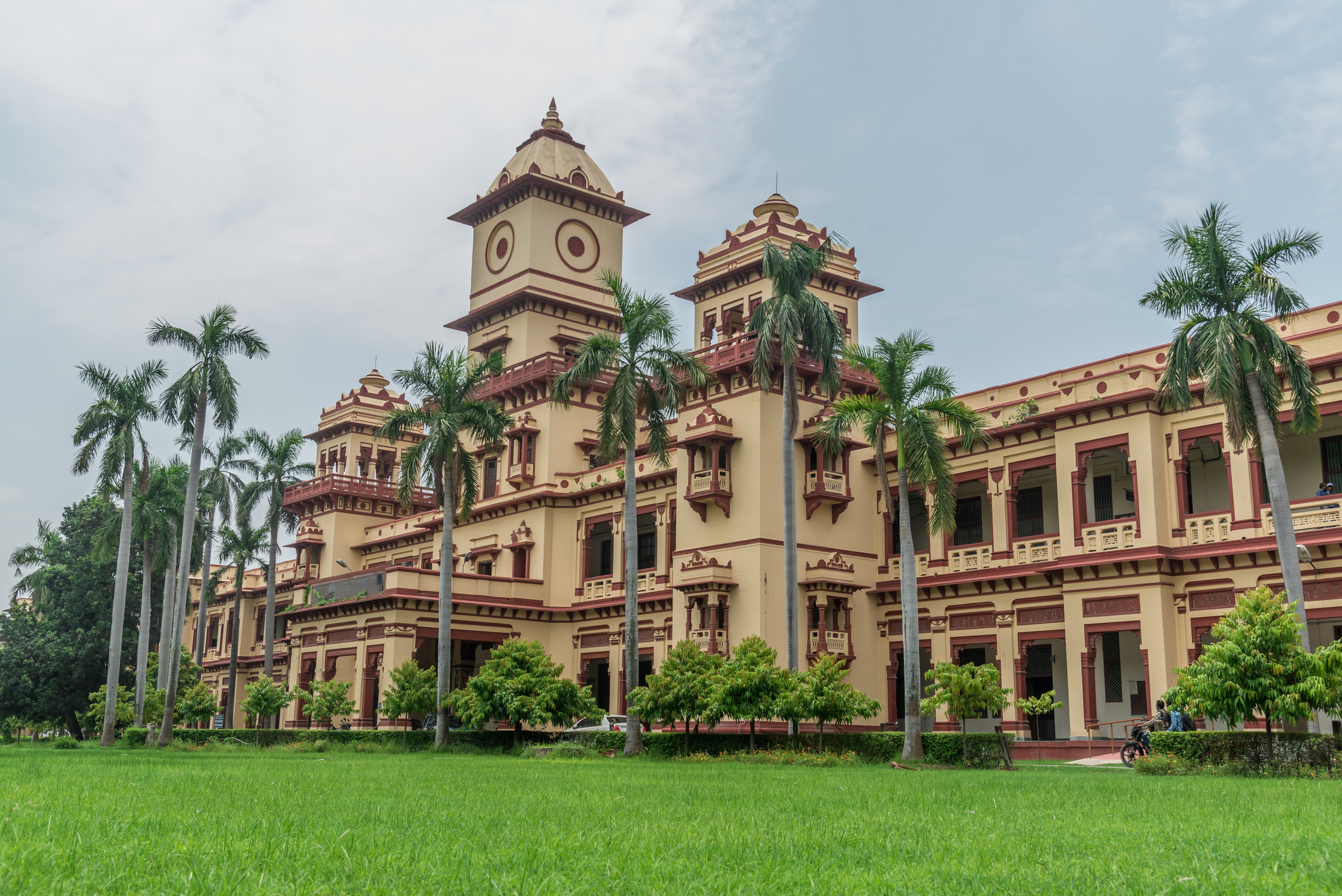
Dept. of Electrical Engineering IIT-BHU

The Indian Institute of Technology Banaras Hindu University (IIT-BHU) has its roots in the Institute of Technology, Banaras Hindu University (IT-BHU). Upon receiving a proposal from the MHRD to convert IT-BHU into an Indian Institutes of Technology, the university's executive council approved the change in 2012. Today the IIT-BHU functions as an autonomous IIT, with certain powers vested in the BHU. IIT provides courses at UG, PG, and PhD level.

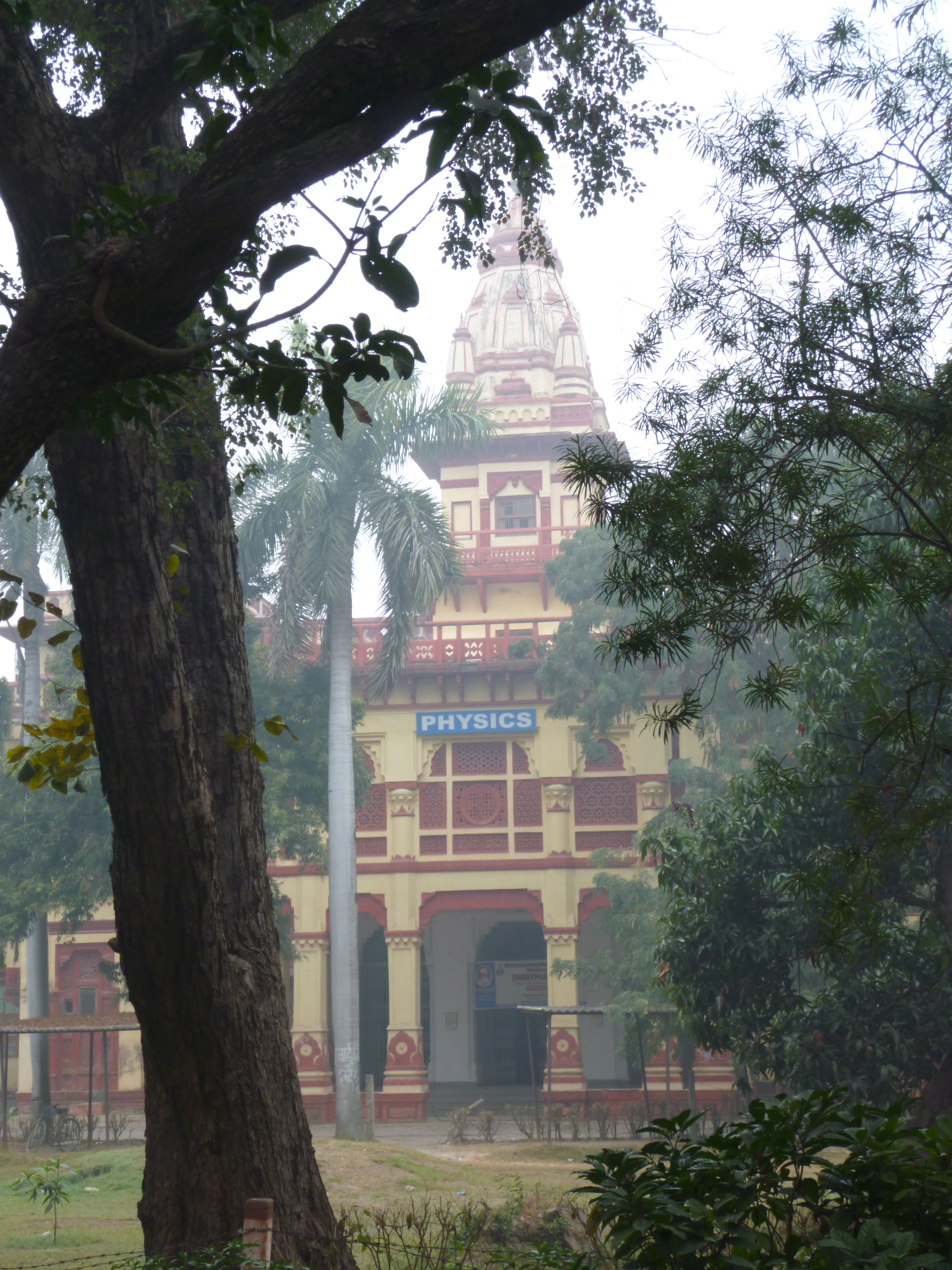
Department of Physics, Banaras Hindu University

The Institute of Science, originally established as the Faculty of Science and later upgraded, provides education in botany, biochemistry, chemistry, computer science, geography, geology, geophysics, home science, mathematics, molecular & human genetics, physics, school of biotechnology, statistics, zoology. The institute also publishes the double-blind peer reviewed Journal of Scientific Research.

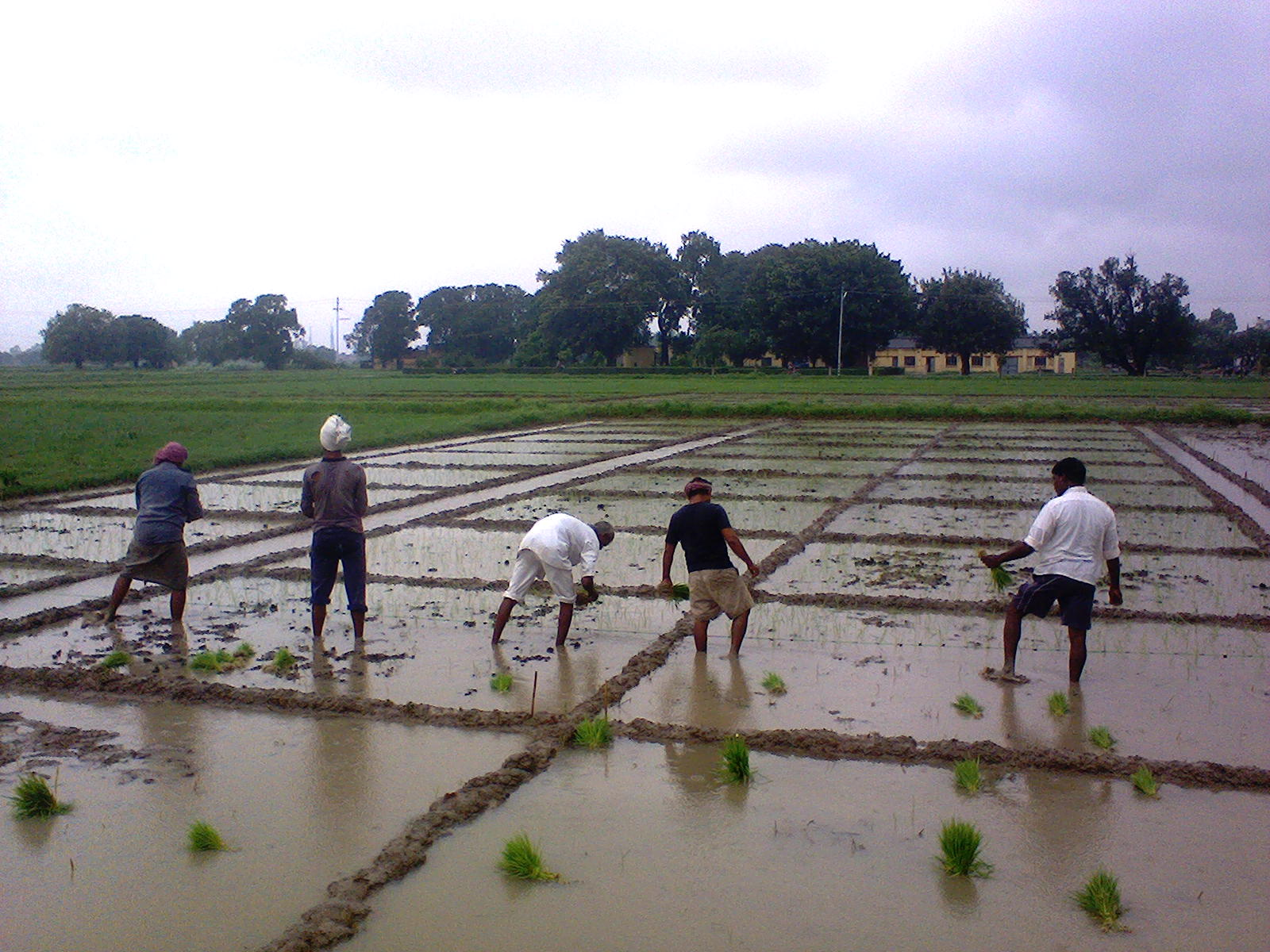
Agriculture Fields of Institute of Agricultural Sciences, BHU

Established in 1931 as the Institute of Agricultural Research, the Institute of Agricultural Sciences is one of the premier institutes of agricultural sciences in India. The institute comprises 11 departments and four auxiliary units and imparts education through undergraduate, postgraduate, special courses, PhD, and diploma programs.

Institute of Medical Sciences, BHU

The Institute of Medical Sciences (IMS-BHU), comprising three faculties and one college, is one of the premier medical institutions in India. The institute provides courses at undergraduate, postgraduate, PhD, and diploma levels. It also has the Sir Sunderlal Hospital, and a Trauma centre and Super Speciality Hospital. IMS-BHU is equivalent to the status of AIIMS.

Sir Sundarlal Hospital, IMS-BHU

The Institute of Environment & Sustainable Development (IESD), which aims to develop and advance the knowledge of technology and processes for sustainable development, was started in 2010. The institute was established in accordance with the United Nations Decade of Education for Sustainable Development goal to contribute significantly to the development of appropriate knowledge and competences in the area of sustainable development.

Starting as the Department of Management Studies, which was upgraded to Faculty of Management Studies in 1984, Institute of Management Studies (abbreviately referred to FMS-BHU or IM-BHU) was finally upgraded into an institute in 2015. The Institute of Management Studies is the business school of Banaras Hindu University. Among the earliest management schools in India, the institute imparts education at postgraduate and doctoral levels. Alok Kumar Rai, a professor at FMS-BHU has served as the vice-chancellor of the University of Lucknow.

== Faculties ==
There are nine standalone (which are not under any institute or college) faculties at the Banaras Hindu University:

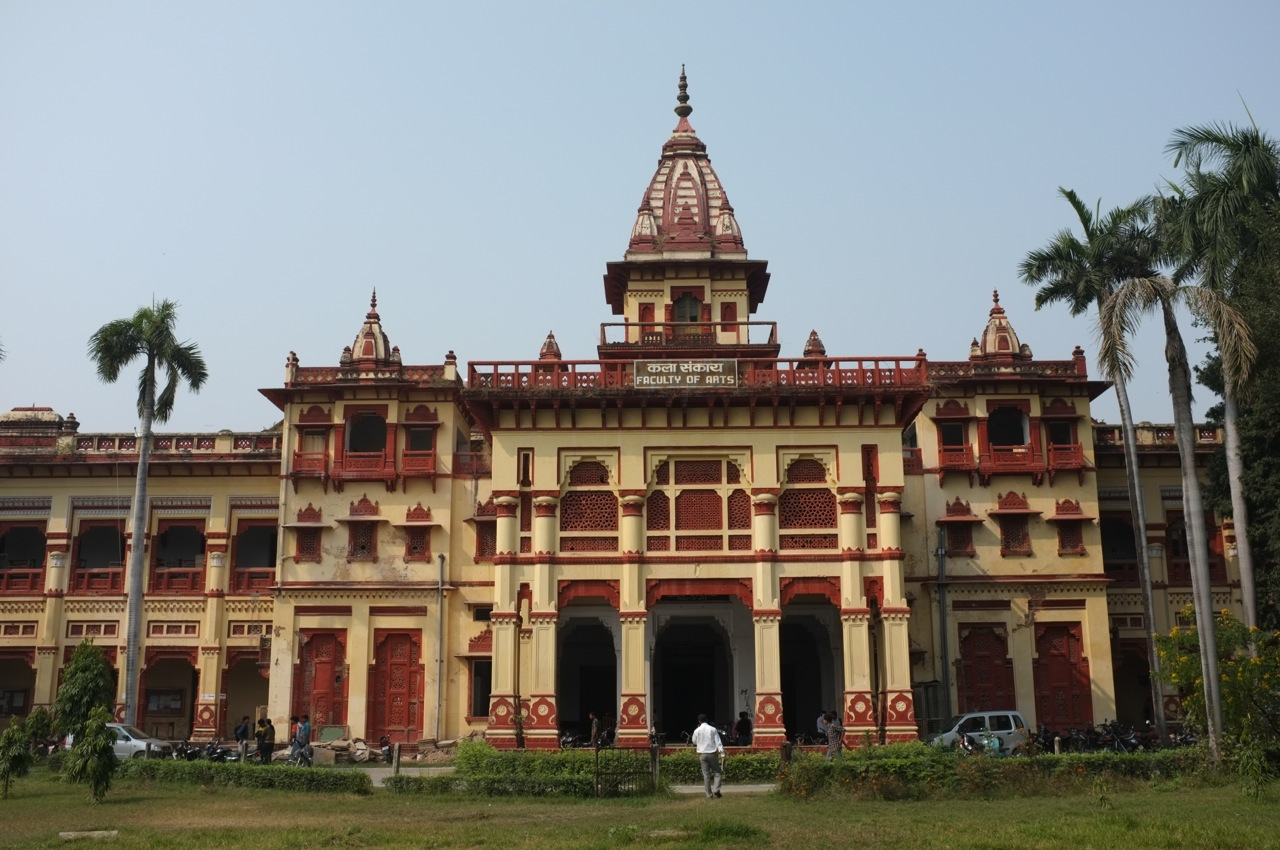
Faculty of Arts, Banaras Hindu University

Founded in 1898 as the Central Hindu College, the Faculty of Arts is the oldest faculty of the university. It offers courses in History, Culture, Philosophy, Languages, Literature along with various professional and vocational courses. Due to its nature of age, it is also called the 'Mother faculty' of the university.

Established in 1940 as the Department of Commerce, the Faculty of Commerce was fully institutionalised as an independent faculty in 1965. The FoC offers courses at undergraduate, postgraduate, and doctoral levels in commerce, financial management, foreign trade, and risk & insurance.

Established in 1918 as the Teacher's Training College, the Faculty of Education is based out of the Kamachchha Complex (outside main campus). The FoE provides B.Ed., B.Ed. (Special Visual Impairment), M.Ed. and Ph.D. in education. The faculty has been publishing its journal National Journal of Education starting 1978.

Established in 1922, the Law School offers courses at undergraduate, postgraduate, doctoral, and diploma level in law.

The Faculty of Performing Arts offers undergraduate, postgraduate and doctorate courses in performing arts. It was founded in 1950 and had several renowned and award-winning artists and musicians as faculty members. Faculty of Performing Arts was started by Omkarnath Thakur in 1950. It was initially instituted as a college called "Music and Fine Arts". In 1966, under Govind Malviya and founding principal Omkarnath Thakur, the college was restructured to a faculty, with three departments (Vocal music, Instrumental music and Musicology). The Faculty of Performing Arts claims to have started the first department of Musicology in India headed by musicologist Prem Lata Sharma.

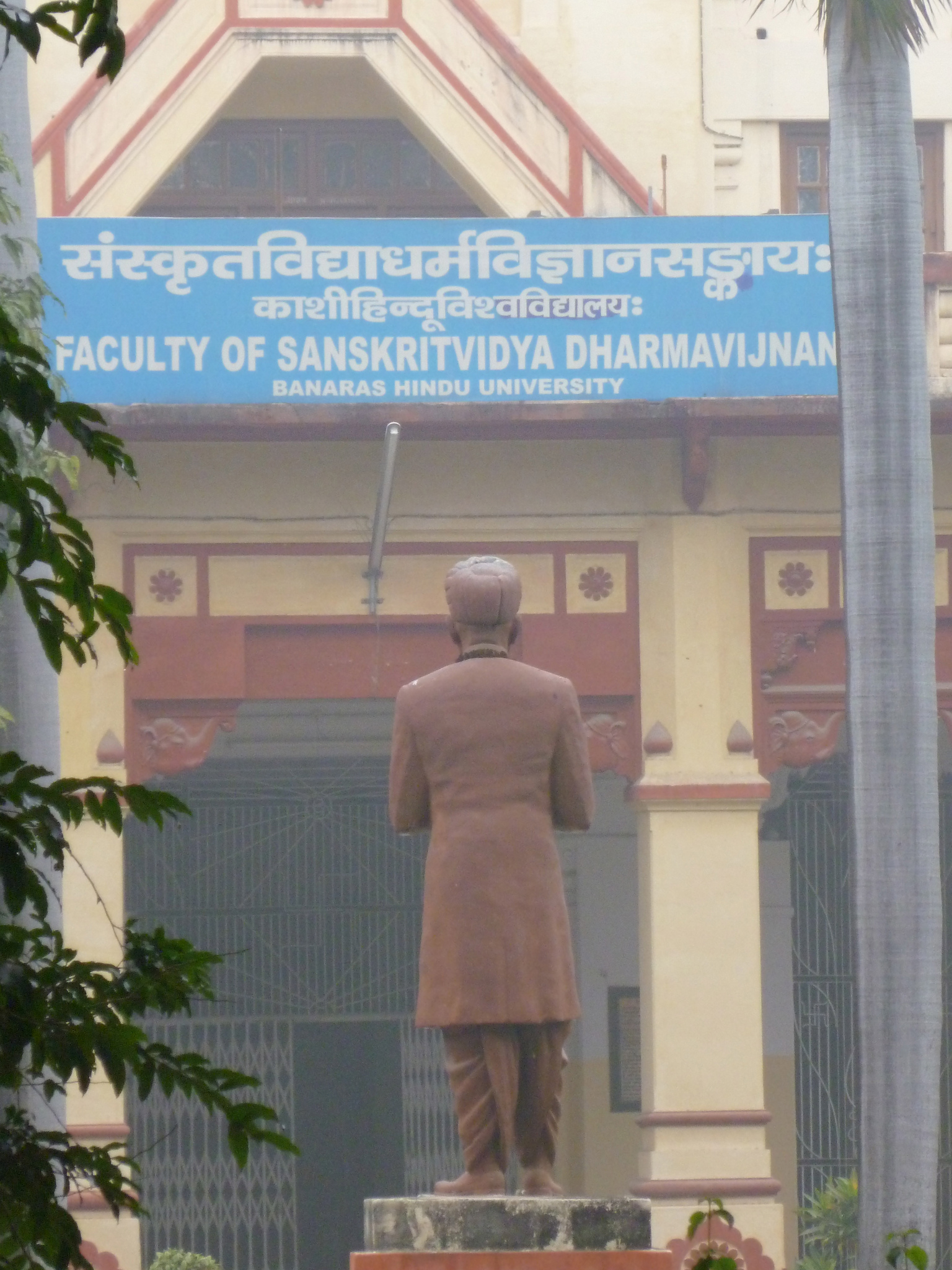
Faculty of Sanskrit Vidya Dharma Vijnan

Established in 1918, the Faculty of Sanskrit Vidya Dharma Vijnan (SVDV) offers courses at Shastri (undergraduate), Acharya (postgraduate), Vidyavaridhi (doctoral) and diploma levels in Hindu, Jain, and Buddhism practices and philosophies. The Faculty of Visual Arts offers undergraduate and postgraduate courses in applied and visual arts. It was founded in 1916. It includes five departments: Painting, Applied arts, Plastic arts, Pottery and Ceramics, and Textile designing.

The Faculty of Social Sciences was bifurcated from the Faculty of Arts in 1971. It offers undergraduate and postgraduate courses in Social science and includes the departments of Economics, History, Political Science, Psychology and Sociology. Other than the departments, there are five centres which carry on the studies in various fields, namely the Centre for the Study of Nepal, Centre for Women's Study and Development, Centre for Integrated Rural Development, Centre for the Study of Social Exclusion and Inclusion Policy and the Malviya Centre for Peace Research. and Special Courses like Master of Personnel Management and Industrial Relations (MPMIR).

=== Colleges and schools ===
==== Colleges ====
Four colleges in Varanasi are admitted to the privileges of the Banaras Hindu University.

The DAV Post Graduate College is a public, co-ed, research college admitted to the privileges of Banaras Hindu University, which was established in 1938. The DAV PG College is also accredited with A+ rating by NAAC. There are three public women's colleges: Arya Mahila Post Graduate College, established in 1956; Vasanta College for Women, which was established in 1913 by Annie Besant; and Vasant Kanya Mahavidyalaya, established in 1954.

Mahila Mahavidyalaya (MMV) (transl. Women's College) is a women's college, established in 1929, located inside the university campus.

==== Schools ====
Three schools in Varanasi are run by the Banaras Hindu University School Board:

- Ranveer Sanskrit Vidyalaya,
- Central Hindu Boys School
- Central Hindu Girls School

Kendriya Vidyalaya BHU situated inside the university campus is an autonomous body under the Ministry of Education, run by the Kendriya Vidyalya Sangathan.

=== Inter-disciplinary schools ===
==== School of Biotechnology ====
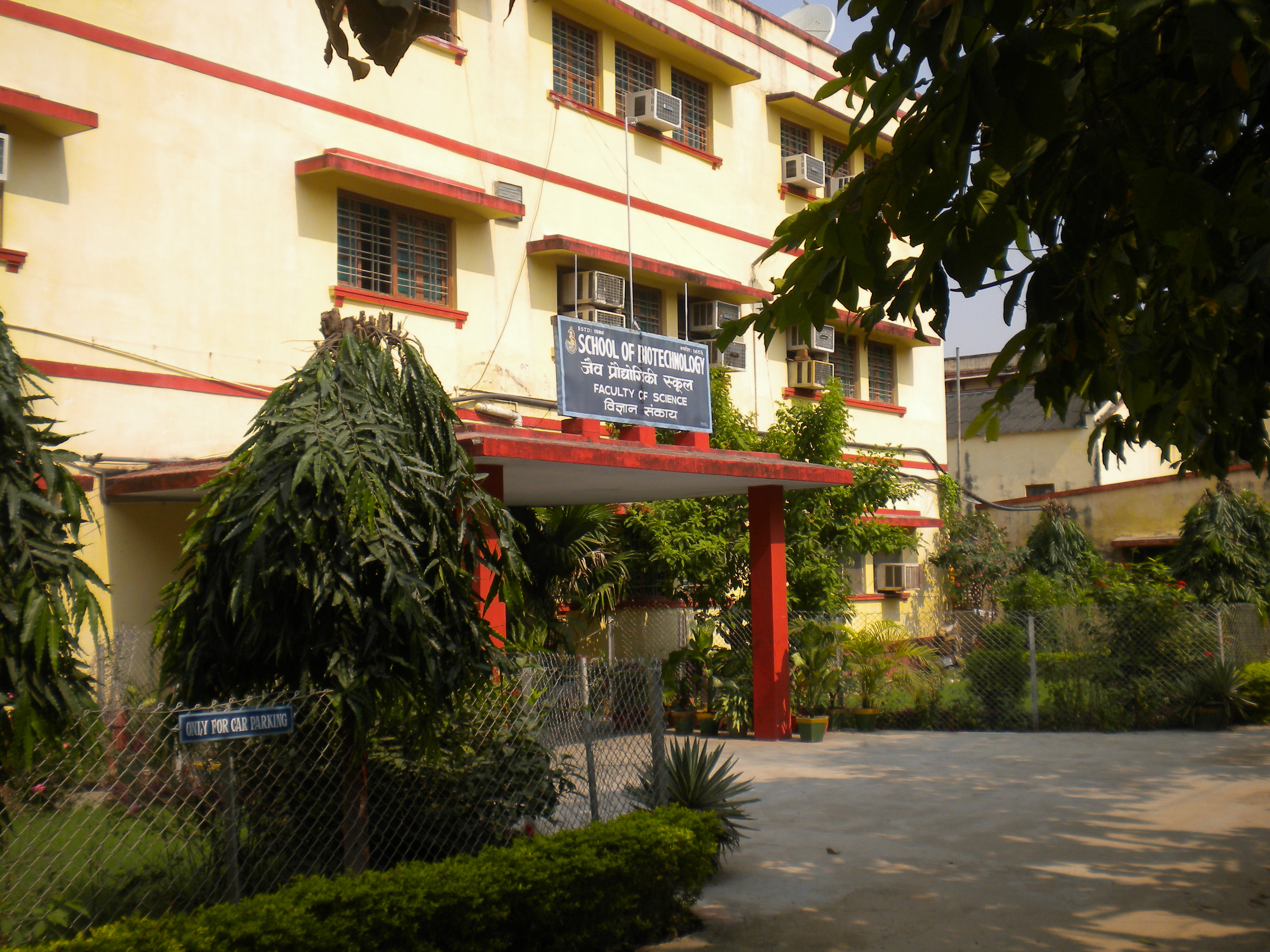
School of Biotechnology, Faculty of Science, Banaras Hindu University

The School of Biotechnology (SBT) is a center for postgraduate teaching and research under the aegis of Institute of Science of the BHU. It was established in 1986 with funding from the Department of Biotechnology, of the Ministry of Science and Technology, Government of India. It offers MSc and PhD programmes in Biotechnology.

The interdisciplinary program involves the partnership between the Institute of Science, the Institute of Medical Sciences and the Indian Institute of Technology at BHU. Notable faculty include Arvind Mohan Kayastha.

==== DBT-BHU Interdisciplinary School of Life Sciences ====
The Interdisciplinary School of Life Sciences (ISLS) is a joint initiative of the Department of Biotechnology (DBT), Government of India and the BHU. It was established with a grant of INR 238.9 million from the DBT.

=== Research centres ===
Apart from specialised centres directly funded by DBT, DST, ICAR and ISRO, a large number of departments under the Institutes of Sciences, Engineering & Technology and Faculty of Social Sciences receive funding from the DST Fund for Improvement of Science & Technology Infrastructure (FIST) and the University Grants Commission (UGC) Special Assistance Programme (SAP). UGC SAP provides funds under its Centre of Advanced Study (CAS), Department of Special Assistance (DSA) and Departmental Research Support (DRS) programmes.

The Centre for Genetic Disorders was established in 2008. This centre is involved in genetic diagnosis and counselling of cases referred from BHU hospital. The centre is engaged in research on various genetic disorders. It offers Ph.D. programmes and a one-year PG diploma course on Chromosomal, Genetic and Molecular Diagnostics.

The Centre for Interdisciplinary Mathematical Sciences (CIMS) focuses on research and education in mathematics, modelling and statistics. It was established under the management of the Faculty of Science, with support from the Department of Science and Technology (DST). The centre imparts post-graduate education and research with participation from the Department of Mathematics, Department of Statistics and Department of Computer Science of the Institute of Science and the Department of Applied Mathematics of the IIT-BHU. It regularly organises training programmes, workshops, seminars, and conferences.

The Centre of Food Science & Technology (CFST) is an inter-disciplinary research centre with collaboration between the Institute of Agricultural Sciences and the Indian Institute of Technology (BHU) focusing on food processing technology. The Center for Environmental Science and Technology (CEST) is an interdisciplinary university research centre at the Faculty of Science. The CEST conducts three-year M.Sc.(Tech) and Ph.D. programmes in Environmental Science & Technology. The centre also works to coordinate environmental programmes of the university.

Established by the executive council of the university under the Government of India's Namami Gange Mission, the Malaviya Research Centre for Ganga, River Development & Water Resource Management is dedicated to the study of pollution of the Ganges. The centre focuses on the study of river basin ecology, hydrology and pollution management, technology development, socio-economic and culture, and data management. The centre provides training called Ganga Mitra (transl. Ganga's Friends) in pursuance of its objectives on various subjects. Established in 1991, the Malviya Centre for Ethics and Values aims to promote ethics and human values in higher education. The centre provides two-year diploma courses on human values and ethics. The centre has been tasked as the nodal agency for developing and monitoring courses on human values and ethics in all central universities.

==== Other research centres ====
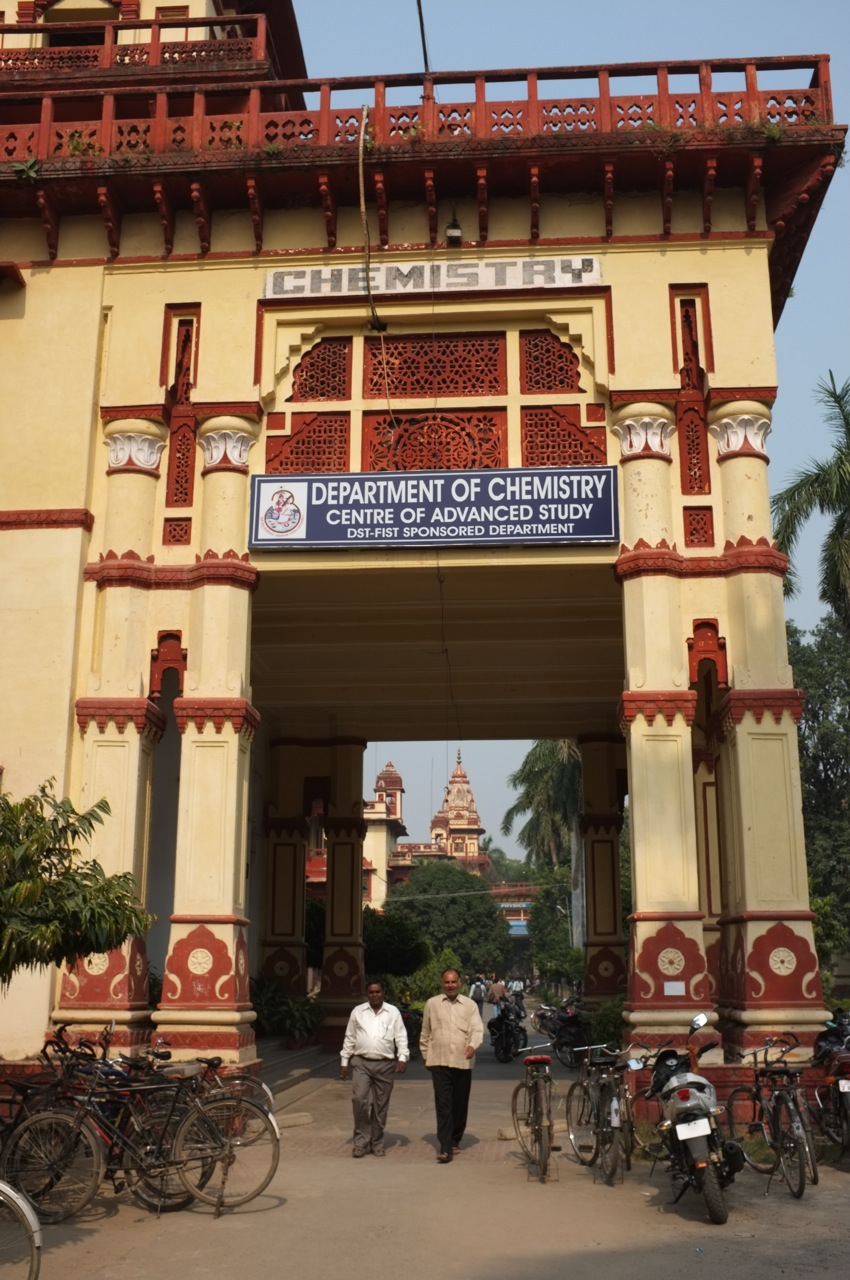
Centre for Advanced Study, Banaras Hindu University

Other research centres of the university include:

- Centre for Vedic Science
- Center for Nanotechnology
- Hydrogen Energy Center
- UGC Advanced Immunodiagnostic Training and Research Center
- Centre for Experimental Medicine and Surgery
- Center for Women's Studies and Development
- Center for the Study of Nepal
- Malviya Center for Peace Research
- Center for Rural Integrated Development
- Centre for Study of Social Exclusion and Inclusive Policy

=== Special centres ===
==== Design Innovation Centre ====
Funded by Department of Higher Education, MHRD, and established in 2015, the Design Innovation Centre(DIC) is a collaboration between IIT-BHU and BHU. The DIC focuses on providing a platform to the students and faculties of the university in order to foster innovation and creative problem solving. The centre also serves Indian Institute of Information Technology, Allahabad, Motilal Nehru National Institute of Technology Allahabad, and the University of Allahabad.

==== BioNest-BHU ====
Established in 2020 as the InnoResTech Foundation-BHU (called BioNest-BHU) by funding from the Biotechnology Industry Research Assistance Council, BioNest-BHU aims to promote startup and entrepreneurship in sciences, biotechnology, healthcare, agritech, food technology, etc. composed of expert faculty members from IMS-BHU, IAS-BHU, and ISc-BHU.

=== Admissions ===
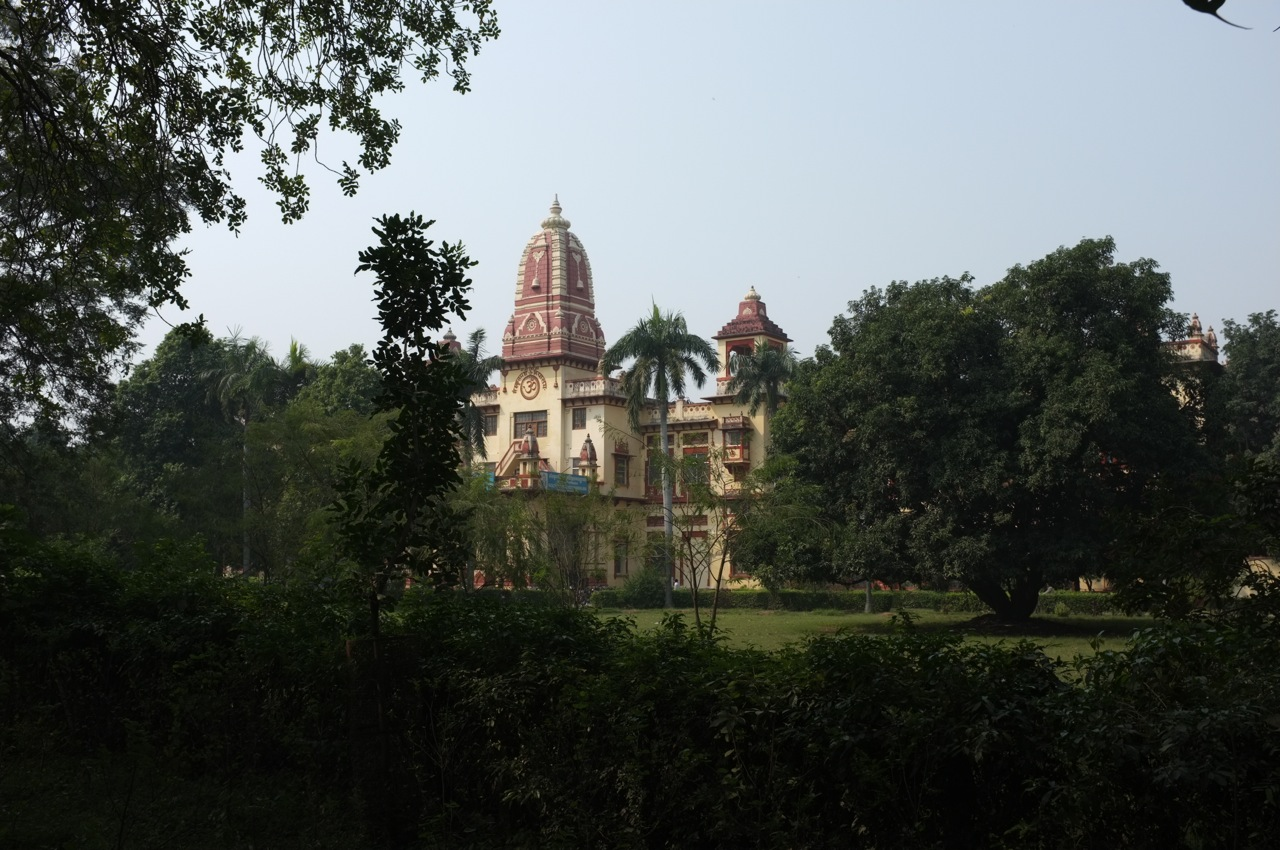
Faculty building in the university

Starting academic year 2022, the university shifted to the Common University Entrance Test (CUET) for admission to several undergraduate and postgraduate courses. Admissions are done according to coursewise eligibility criteria set by the university, merit in the entrance tests, and as per the reservation policy of the Government of India.

University admission statistics
Year	Level	Applications	Offers	Offer Rate(%)
2022	UG	4,34,140	8,231	1.90
2022	PG	3,50,000		
2023	UG	8,30,000		
2023	PG			
2024	UG			
2024	PG			

Admissions to undergraduate programs of IIT-BHU are only through JEE Advanced and GATE. Similarly, admissions to programs of IMS-BHU and FVAS-BHU are through NEET (for all UG programs and for PG programs in modern medicine) and AIAPGET (for postgraduate programs in Ayurveda). Admission to the MBA programs at the Institute of Management Studies is through a mix of Common Admission Test and personal interview, etc.

Admissions for PhD are done on the basis of qualification of National Eligibility Test (NET) by the candidates.

Admissions to the Banaras Hindu University are highly competitive and tough with more than 50 applicants for one seat. BHU attracts a substantial number of international students. The university has a separate admission pipeline for international students. Applications from international students wishing to continue their education at BHU are invited directly to the university International Centre.

Admissions to the diploma and Special Courses of Study (SCS) are conducted through varying processes depending on the faculty, directly by the university.

==== Banaras Hindu University Entrance Tests ====
Until 2021, Banaras Hindu University used to conduct the national level BHU-UET for undergraduate courses, and BHU-PET, for postgraduate courses, usually during May–June for admission for which registrations begun on Vasant Panchami i.e., university foundation day, for over 24 undergraduate and over 100 postgraduate courses. The UET & PET exams were held for 5166 seats in online and offline mode in subject-wise papers. The total exam duration was two hours with multiple-choice questions. Total marks varied with the exam.

The university previously also conducted the Banaras Hindu University Research Entrance Test (BHU-RET) till 2023.

The entire admission process is conducted by the controller of examinations.

=== Rankings ===
University rankings

General – India
- NIRF (Overall) (2024): 11
- NIRF (Research) (2024): 16
- NIRF (Universities) (2024): 5

Engineering – India
- NIRF (2024): 10

Medical – India
- NIRF (2024): 7
- Outlook India (2024): 2

Law – India
- NIRF (2024): 25

Business/Management – India
- NIRF (2024): 48

The University has been ranked among the 501–600 universities globally in the Times Higher Education World University Rankings 2026, while it secured the 224th position in Asia in the same year. In India, the university was placed 11th overall by the National Institutional Ranking Framework (NIRF) 2024. It ranked 5th in the universities category and 16th in the research category for the same year.

In discipline-specific rankings, BHU was ranked 10th in engineering, 7th in the medical, 25th in Law by NIRF and 48th in management in 2024. In the Outlook India rankings 2024, BHU was placed 2nd in the government medical category.

=== Library ===
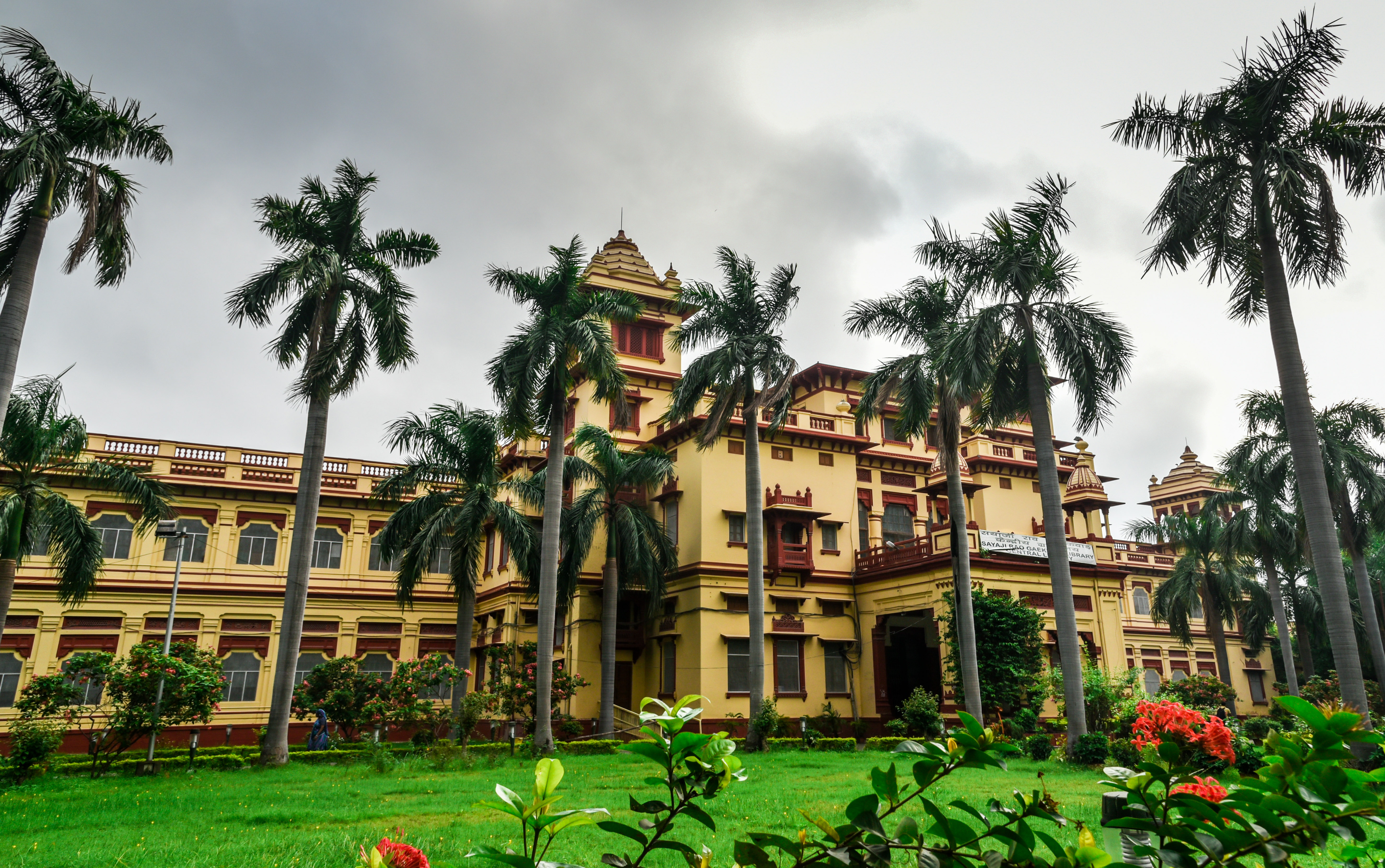
Central Library, BHU

The Banaras Hindu University Library system was established from a collection donated by P.K. Telang in the memory of his father Justice Kashinath Trimbak Telang in 1917. The collection was housed in the Telang Hall of the Central Hindu College, Kamachha. In 1921, the library was moved to the Central Hall of the Arts College (now the Faculty of Arts).

The present Central Library of BHU was established with a donation from Maharaja Sayajirao Gaekwad III of Baroda. Upon his return from the First round Table Conference, Gaekwad wanted a library built on the pattern of the British Library and its reading room, which was then located in the British Museum. On Malviya's suggestion, he made the donation to build the library on the BHU campus.

The Gaekwad Library is a designated Manuscript Conservation Centre (MCC) of the National Mission for Manuscripts, established in 2003.

By 1931, the library had built a collection of around 60,000 volumes. The trend of donation of personal and family collection to the library continued as late as the 1940s with the result that it has unique pieces of rarities of books and journals dating back to the 18th century.

As of 2011, the BHU Library System consisted of the Central Library and 3 Institute Libraries, 8 Faculty Libraries and over 25 Departmental Libraries, with a collection of at least 1.3 million volumes. The digital library is available to students and staff and provides online access to thousands of journals, besides access to large collections of online resources through the National Informatics Centre's DELNET and UGC's INFLIBNET.

== Student life ==
=== Festivals and traditions ===
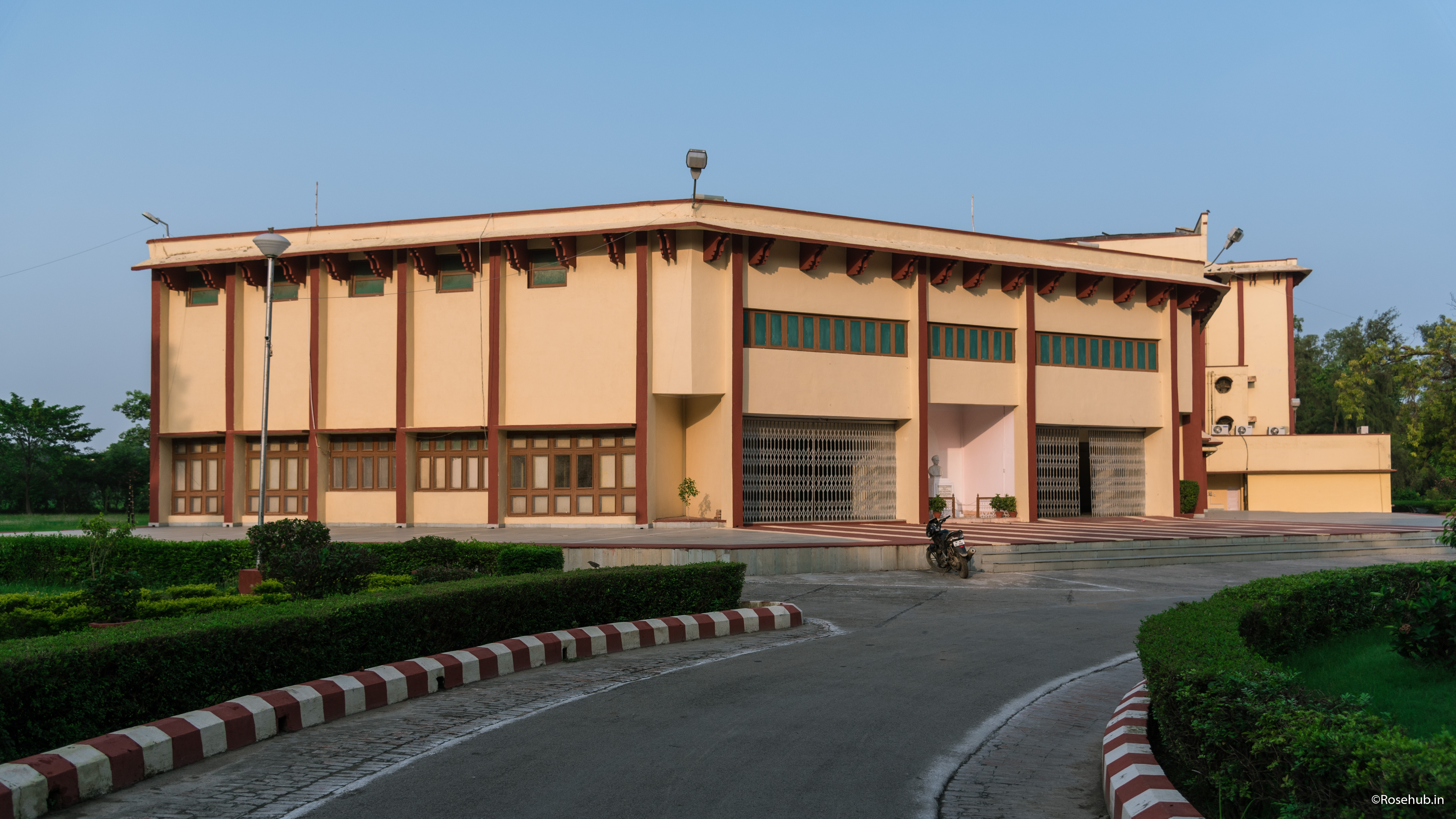
Swatantrata Bhawan (Hall of Independence) is the university auditorium with seating capacity of 2,000

The Banaras Hindu University observes Saraswati puja day (also known as Vasant Panchami) as its foundation day. Goddess Saraswati is the Hindu goddess of knowledge, music, arts, wisdom and nature. She is also the revered mascot of the university, and is a part of the university seal.

There is an intra-university fest, Spandan, where students represent their faculty/institute in various art competitions such as literature (essay-writing, poems, debates), painting, sketches, vocal music, dancing, singing, drama, and mimicry. It is held every year after Vasant Panchami in the month of February or March. Apart from Spandan, each faculty and institute have their own in-house annual festivals.

Since 1971, annual flower exhibition is organised on Malaviya Jayanti (Malaviya's birthday - 25 December).

The university anthem, Banaras Hindu University Kulgeet, is sung in chorus before the convocation or any other official event begins.

Apart from the three national day festivals, the following festivals are celebrated at an official level in the university:

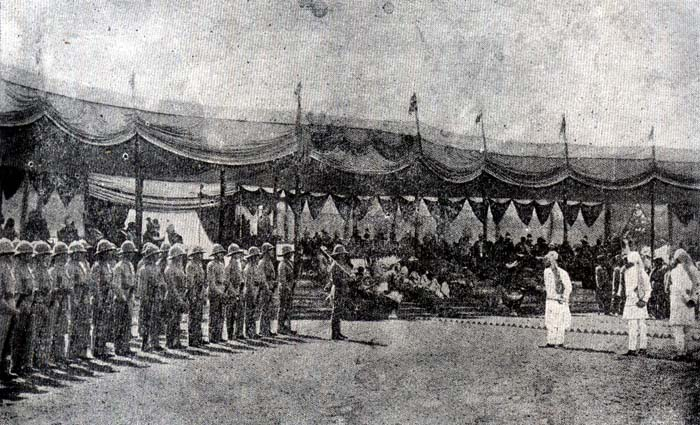
BHU Foundation Day Ceremony in 1916

Major Festivals at the Banaras Hindu University
Name of Faculty/Institute/College	Name of the Festival	Dates	References
Banaras Hindu University	Foundation Day	On Vasant Panchami	
Banaras Hindu University	Spandan (Intra-university festival and competition)	February–March	
Indian Institute of Technology (BHU)	Kashiyatra	January	
Institute of Science, BHU	Aakanksha	February–March	
Institute of Agricultural Sciences, BHU	Srishti	February–March	
Institute of Medical Sciences, BHU	Elixir	February–March	
Institute of Management Studies, BHU	Unnayan	February–March	
Faculty of Arts, BHU	Sanskriti	February–March	
Faculty of Social Sciences, BHU	Abhikalpan	February–March	
Law School, BHU	Srijan	December, or February–March	
DAV PG College, BHU	Udaan	June–July	
Banaras Hindu University	Malviya Jayanti	December	

Some other festivals celebrated in the Banaras Hindu University at a non-official, students' level include:

- "Holi Milan Samaroh" (transl. Holi Meeting Event) is celebrated each year outside Vishwanath Temple.
- Janmashtami celebrations are held each year. Jhaanki (Tableaus) are prepared by students celebrating the birth of Lord Krishna.
- Diwali Mahotsav (transl. Diwali Celebrations) are held each year, during which students light-up the campus, hostels, etc. with diyas.
- Guru Nanak Jayanti, Dev Deepawali, etc. are also celebrated by students.

==== Convocation Dress ====
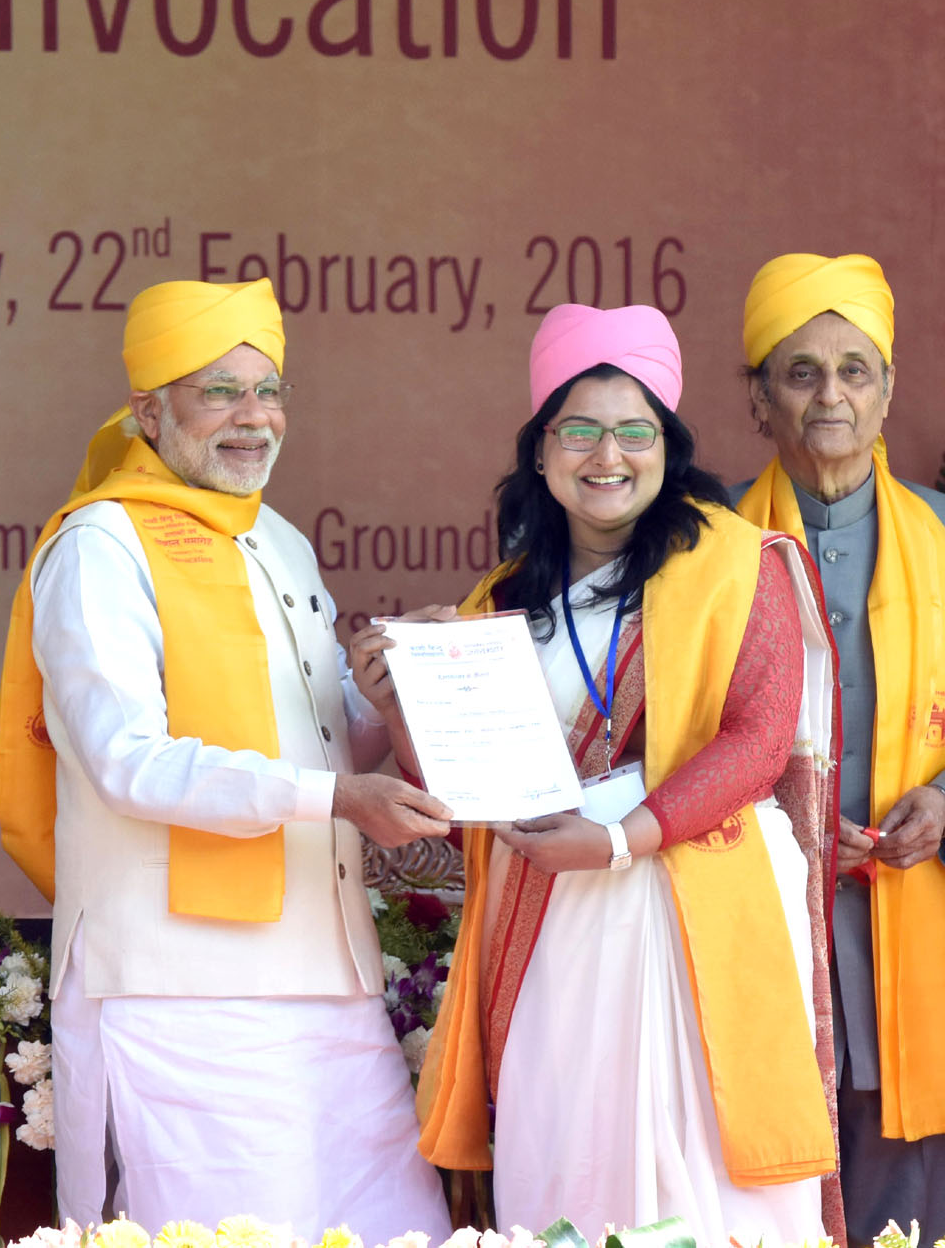
Convocation attendees in university academic costume

Academic costume is mandatory for university convocation. The university's academic costume is White Saree with red border, and red blouse for females; and White Kurta with Dhoti or Pyjama for male students. Both academic costumes include Safa and Uttariya. BHU was the first prominent university in India to ditch Western convocation dress for Indian traditional convocation dress, which led to students at other universities demanding the same, and eventually other universities following suit.

=== Clubs and societies ===
BHU has university level Mountaineering Centre, and University Sports Board. Other interest-specific clubs and societies exist at faculty, institute, and college level, like FSS Connect, which is a consortium of all societies and clubs at the Faculty of Social Sciences. In 2022 BHU Connect was introduced, which is a platform that acts as a consortium for different institutes' clubs and societies, as well as act as an umbrella for students run unit to manage clubs, events and ensure help to aspirants and freshers at the Banaras Hindu University.

=== Awards and medals ===
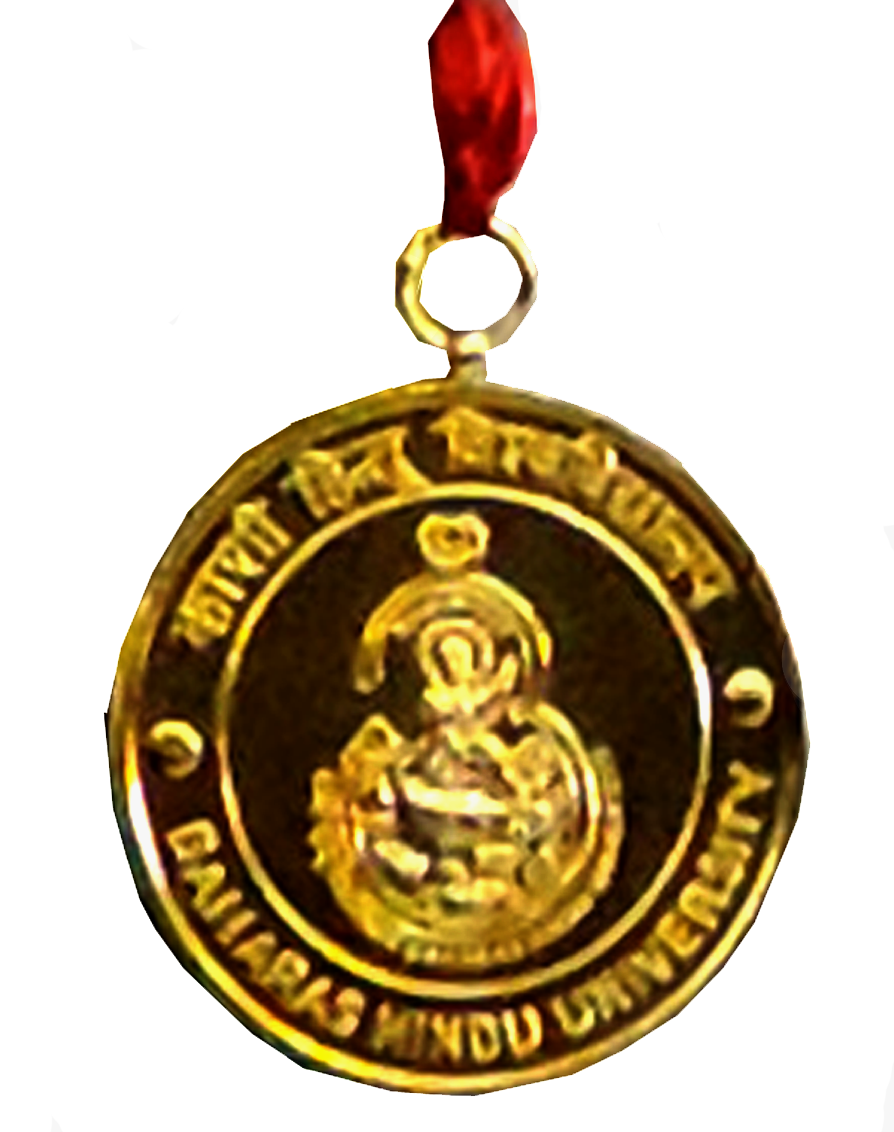
BHU Medal

Medals and prizes are awarded at faculty, as well as university level. Each faculty and institute have several in-house awards and medals. Some of the university level medals include:

- The BHU Chancellor's Medal is given to the student securing highest CGPA in the university.
- The BHU Medal is given to students who secure the first position in their respective courses (e.g. B.Com.).
- Late Maharaja Vibhuti Narain Singh Gold Medal is given to the student securing the highest CGPA in the university.
- Ex-President of India Dr. Shanker Dayal Sharma Gold Medal is awarded to the student exhibiting best character, academic excellence, outstanding co-curricular, extra-curricular, and social services in the university.
- Bhagwandas Thakurdas Chandwani Gold Medal is given to the student standing first in MBBS at the IMS-BHU.
- The Wagle Gold Medal is given to the student standing first in M.A. Economics.

=== Student unions and protests ===
Banaras Hindu University does not have an active political student union, but an administrative student council called the Banaras Hindu University Students Council to represent and safeguard the interests of the students.

Despite no elections, student wings of major political parties have an active presence on the campus.

Organised and unorganised protests are held often in the campus due to the vast majority of students. The most prominent protest in the last few years have been the Banaras Hindu University women's rights protest.

== Notable alumni and faculty ==
Alumni and faculty of the Banaras Hindu University, called BHUians and महामना के मानस पुत्र/पुत्री (transl. Soulful Sons/Daughters of Mahamana), have gained prominence in India and across the world in almost all fields of arts, science, and social work. Two former Presidents of India, Sarvepalli Radhakrishnan and A. P. J. Abdul Kalam have worked and taught at the university. Other famous administrators include Sunder Lal, K. L. Shrimali, and Moti Lal Dhar.

Past and present administrators, visiting faculty and faculty

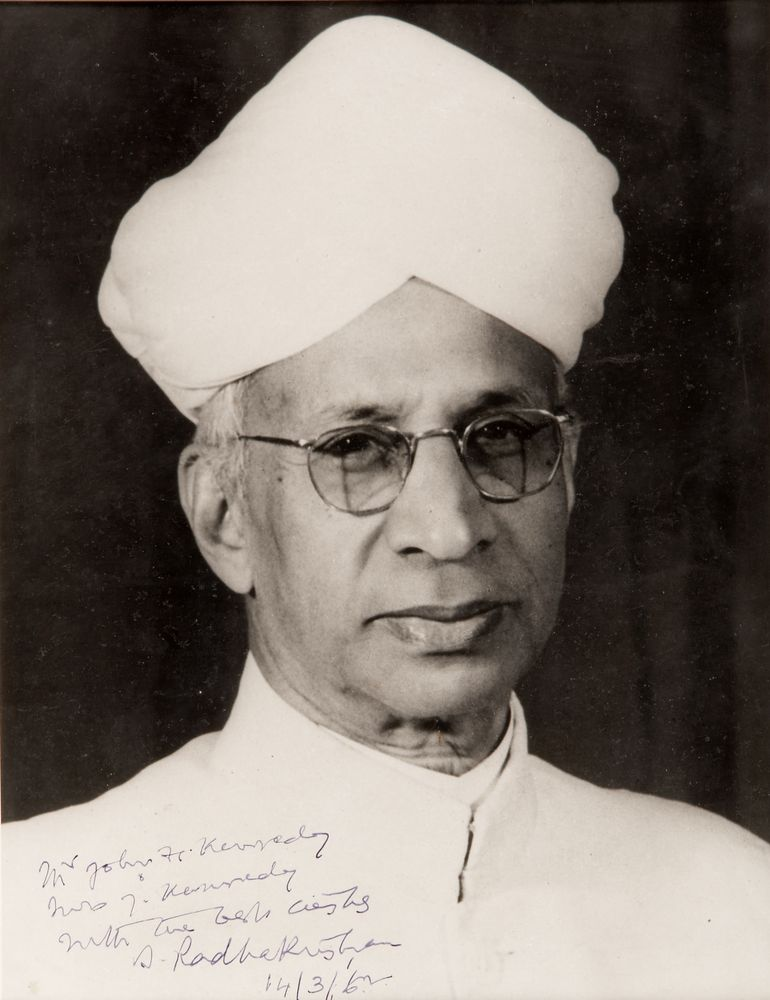
Sarvepalli Radhakrishnan

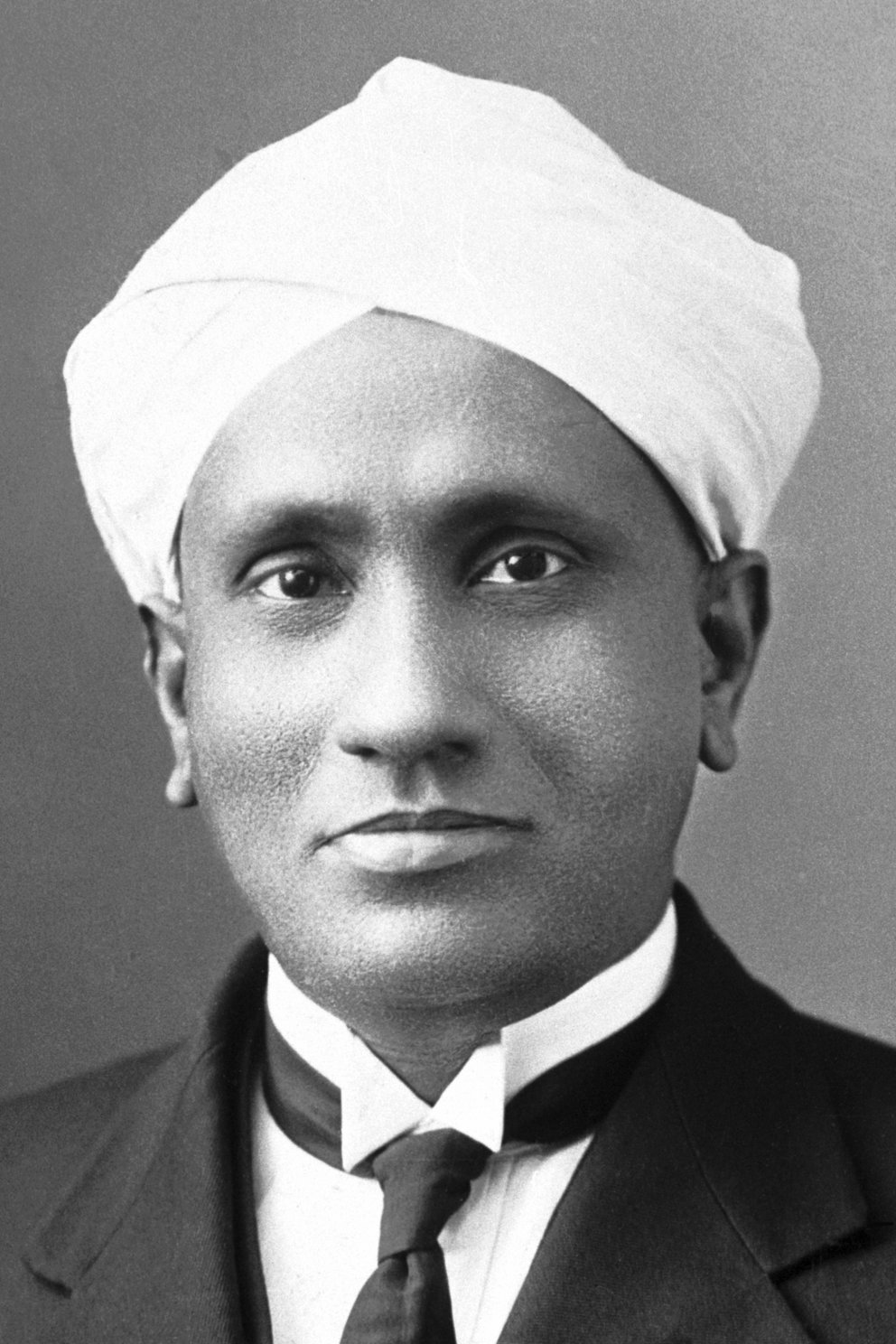
C. V. Raman

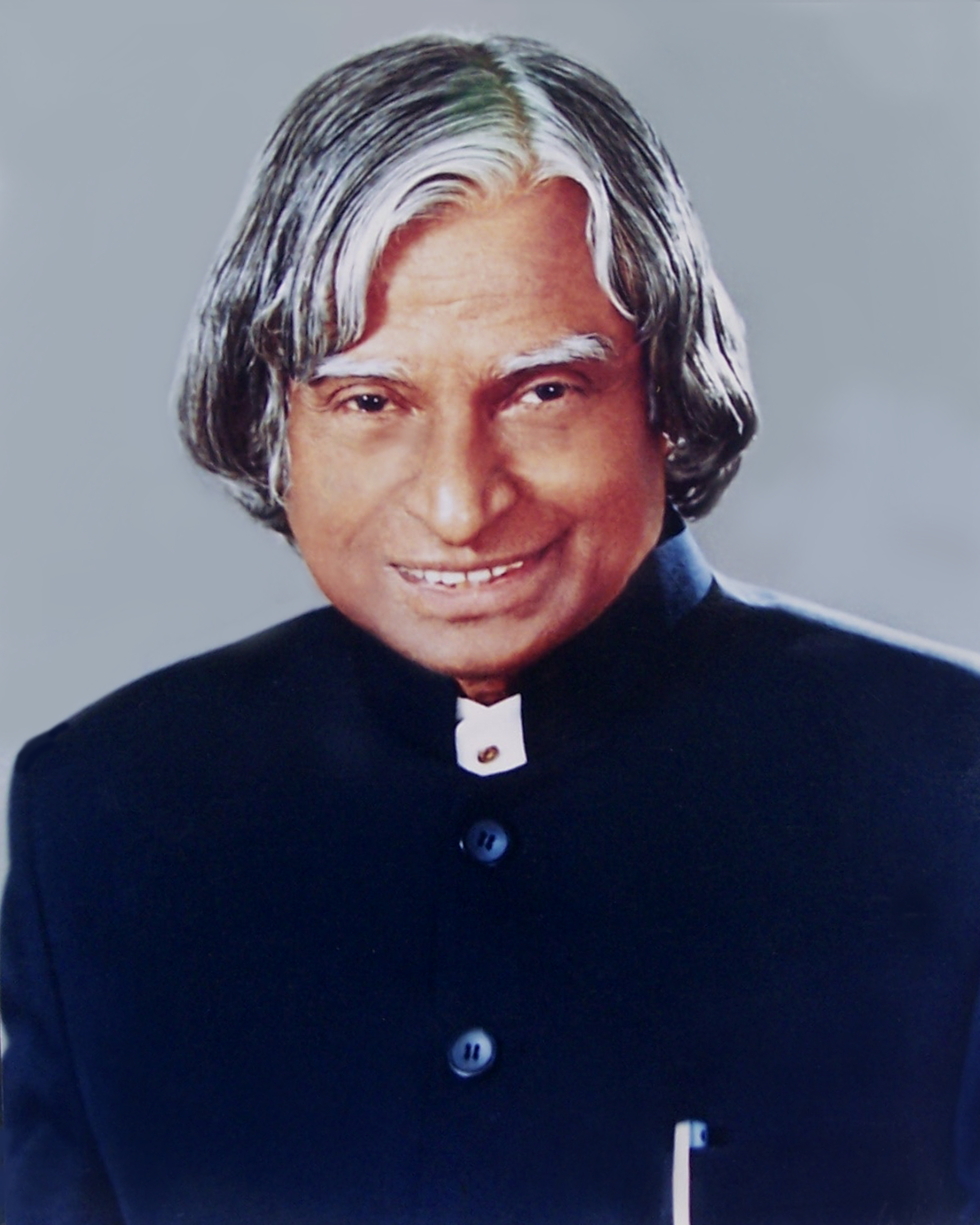
A. P. J, Abdul Kalam

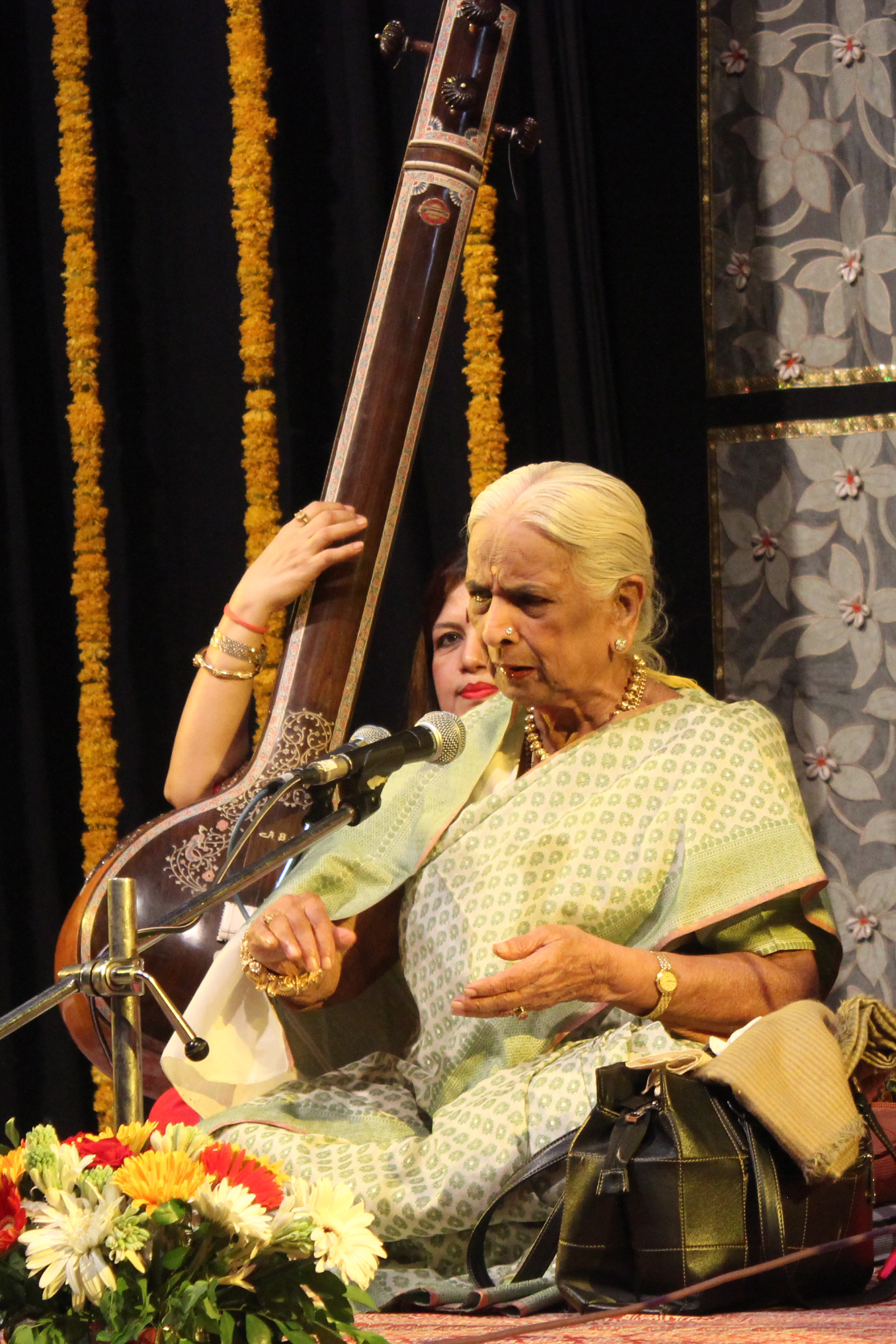
Girija Devi

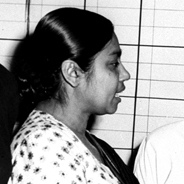
Sucheta Kripalani

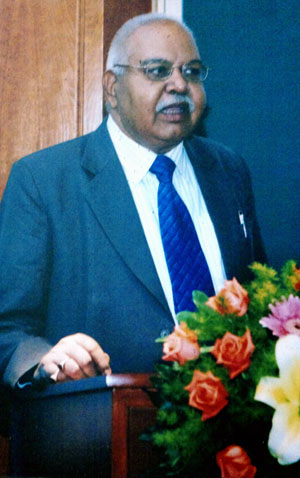
B.C. Nirmal

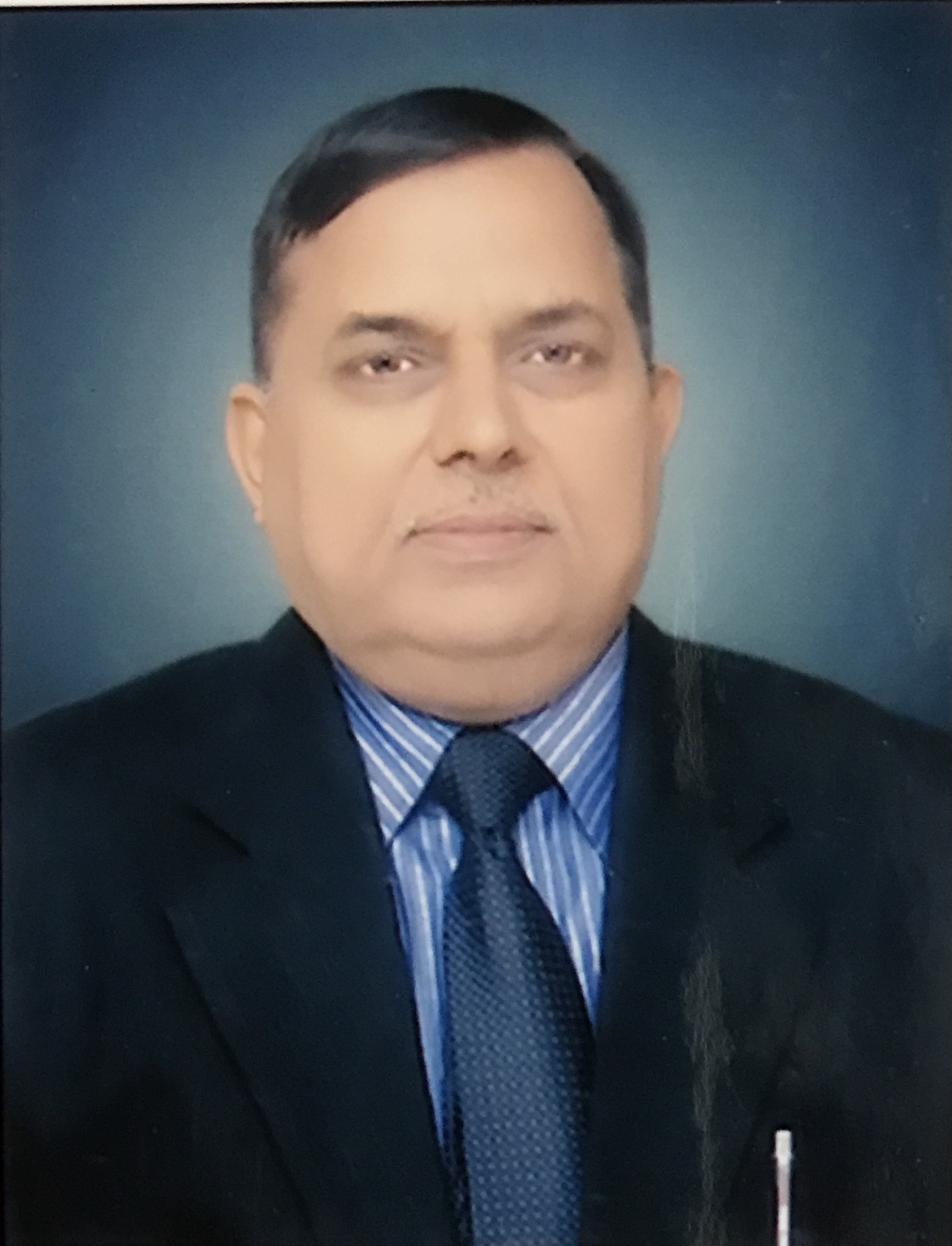
Adya Prasad Pandey

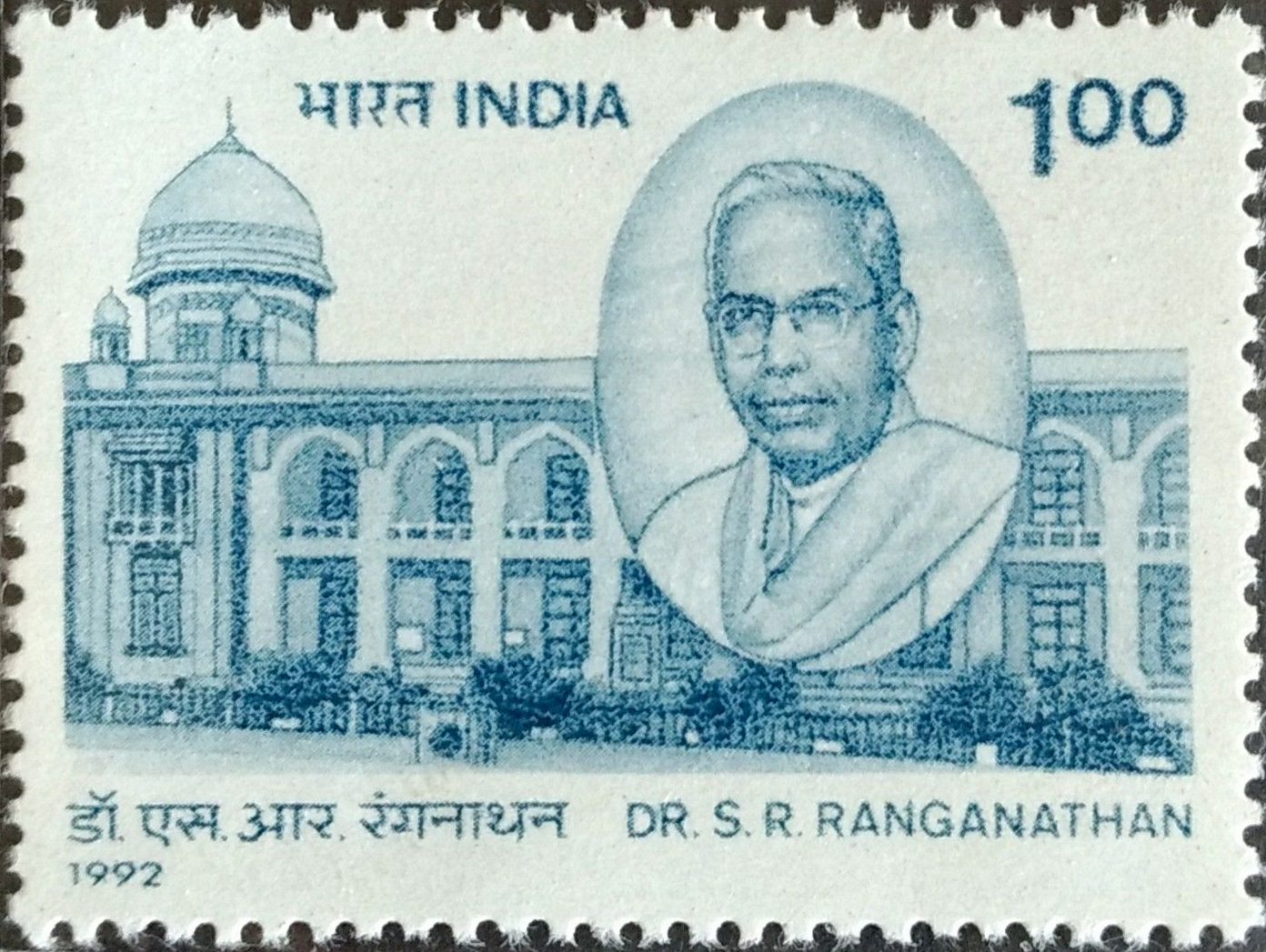
S. R. Ranganathan

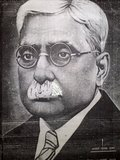
Ramchandra Shukla

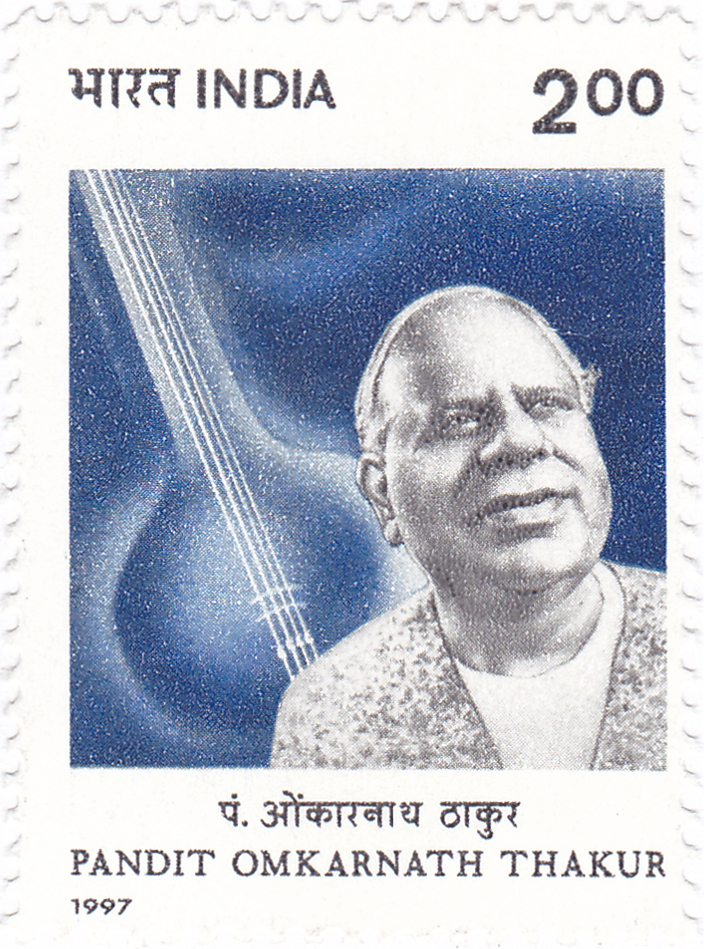
Omkarnath Thakur

Prem Saran Satsangi

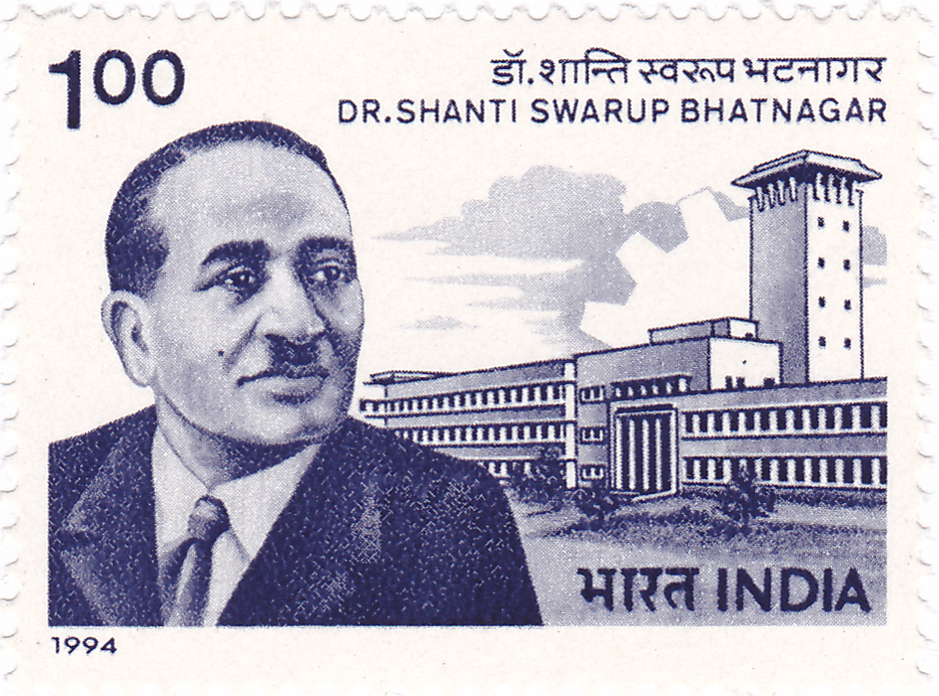
Shanti Swaroop Bhatnagar

Patcha Ramachandra Rao

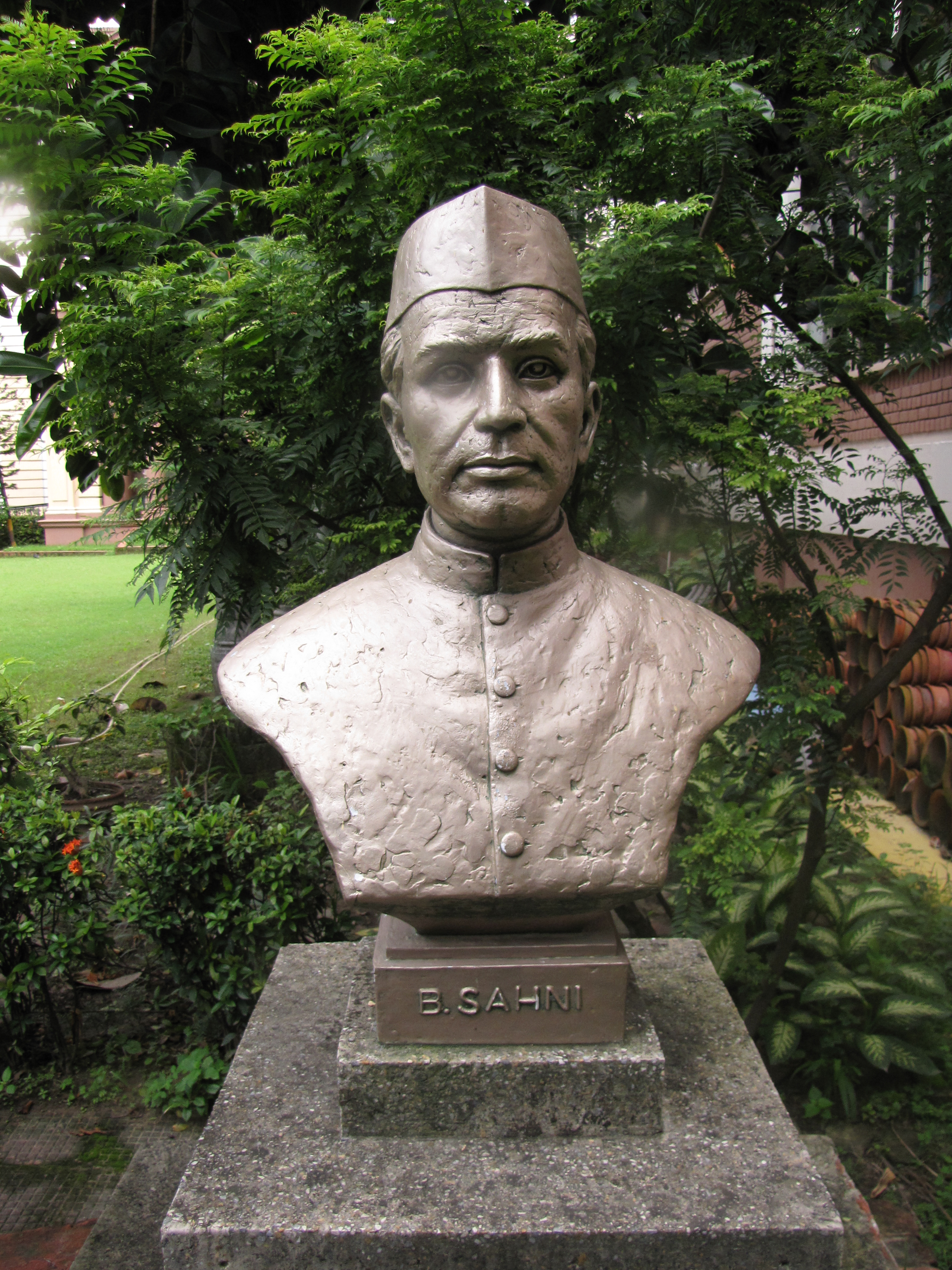
Birbal Sahni

Alumni include:

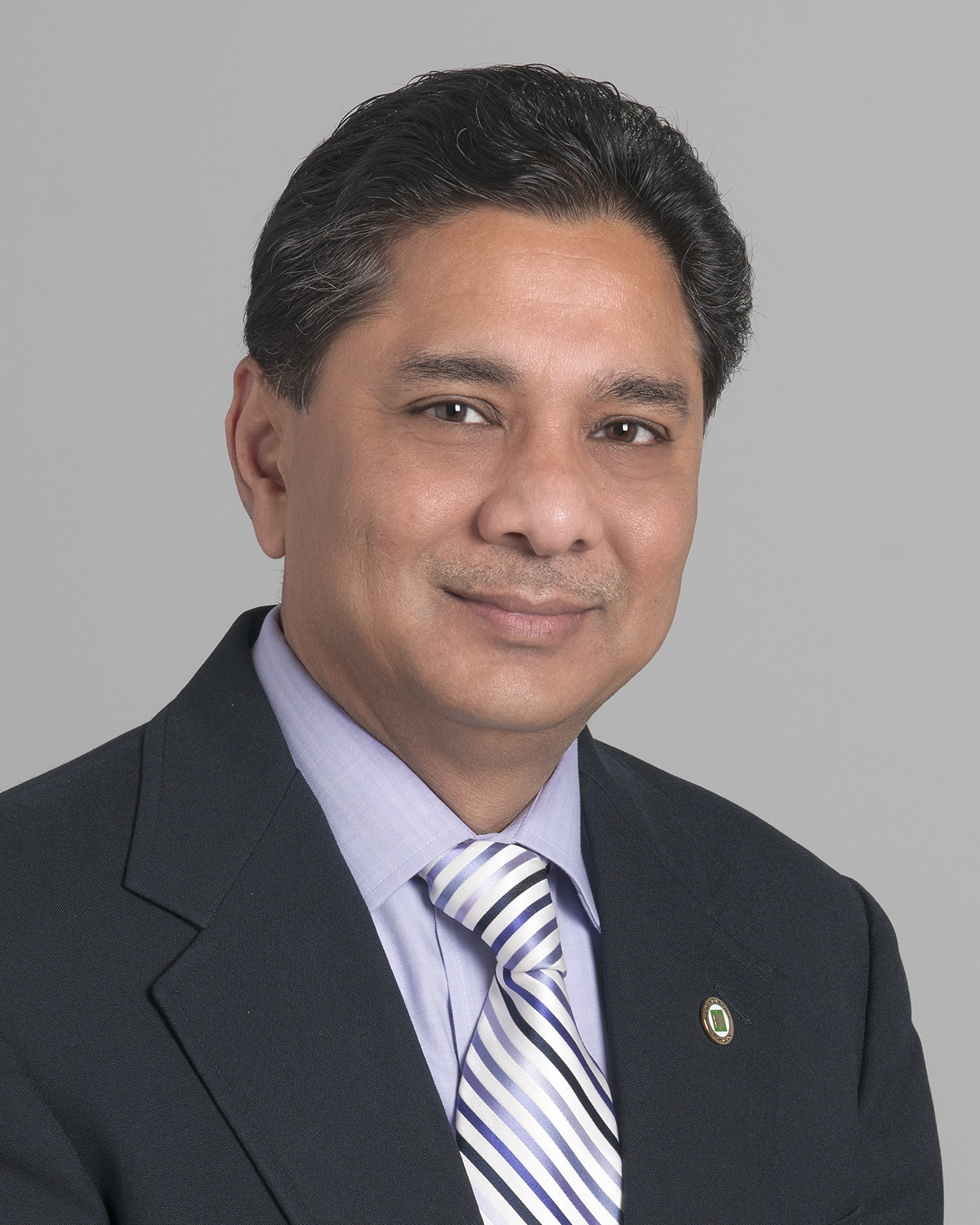
Ashok Agarwal

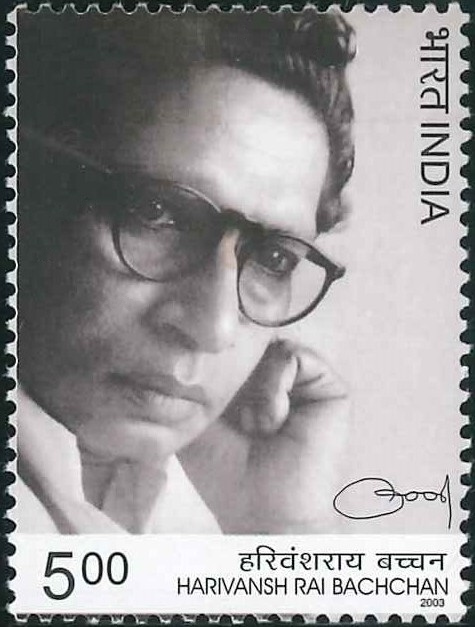
Harivansh Rai Bachchan

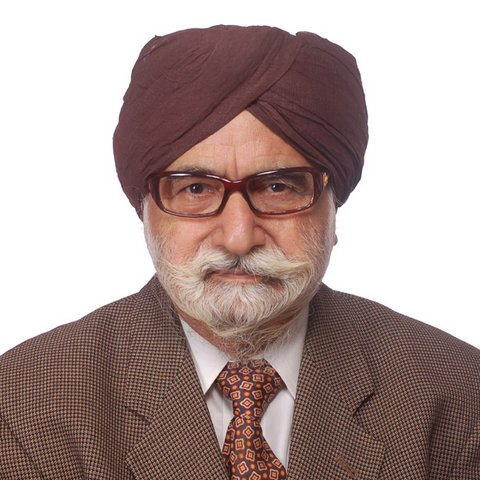
Harkishan Singh

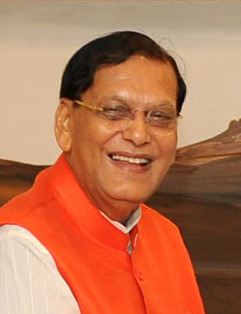
Bindeshwar Pathak

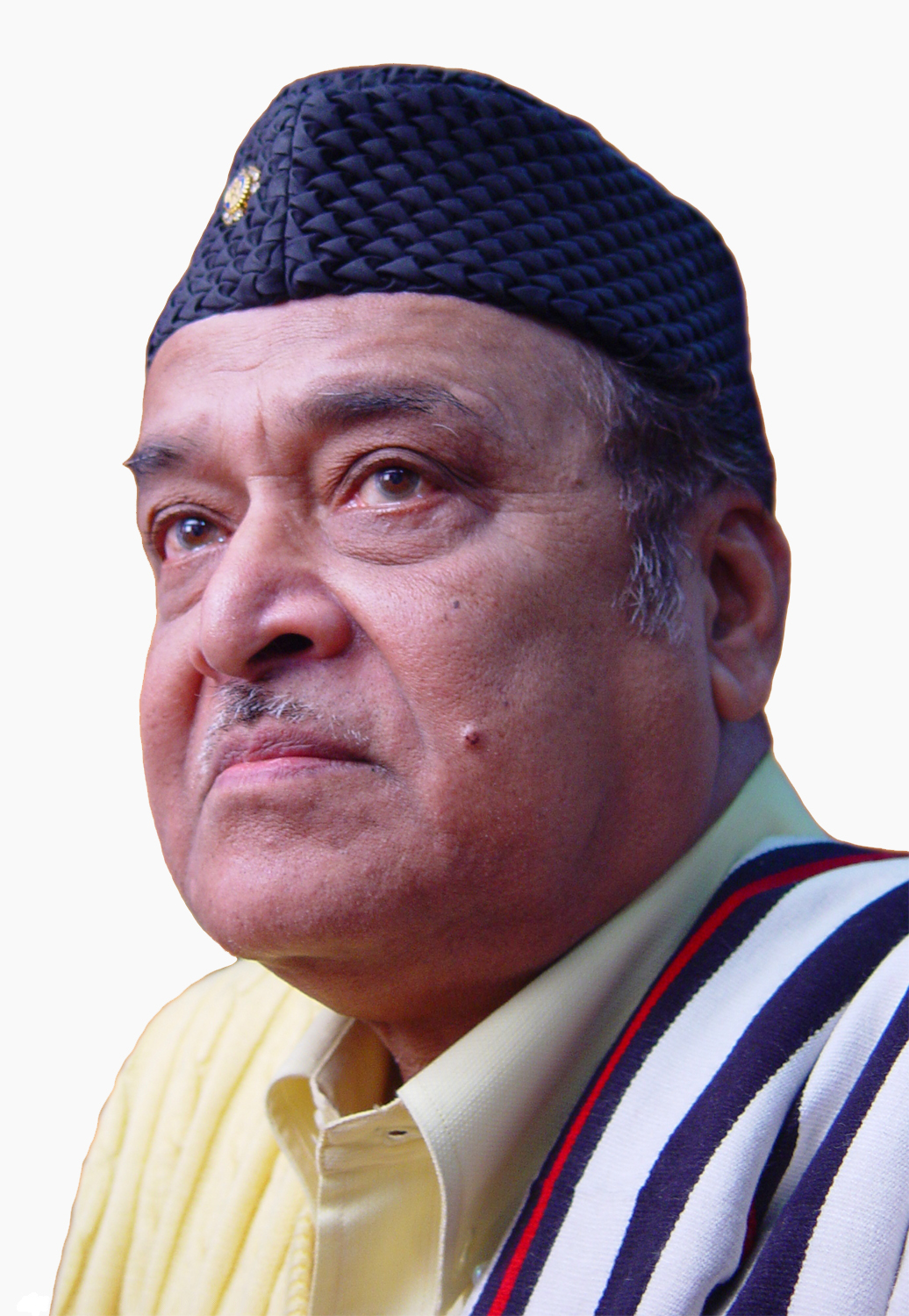
Bhupen Hazarika

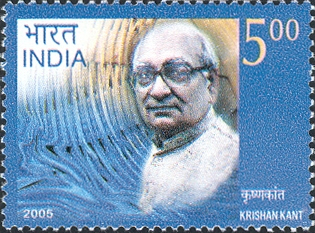
Krishan Kant

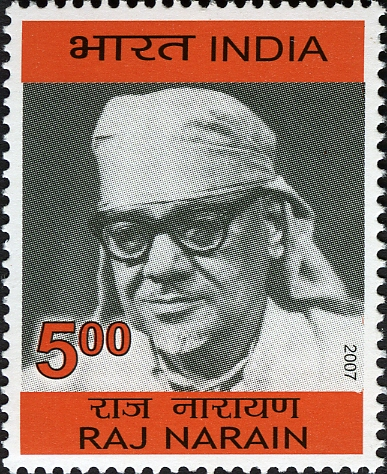
Raj Narain

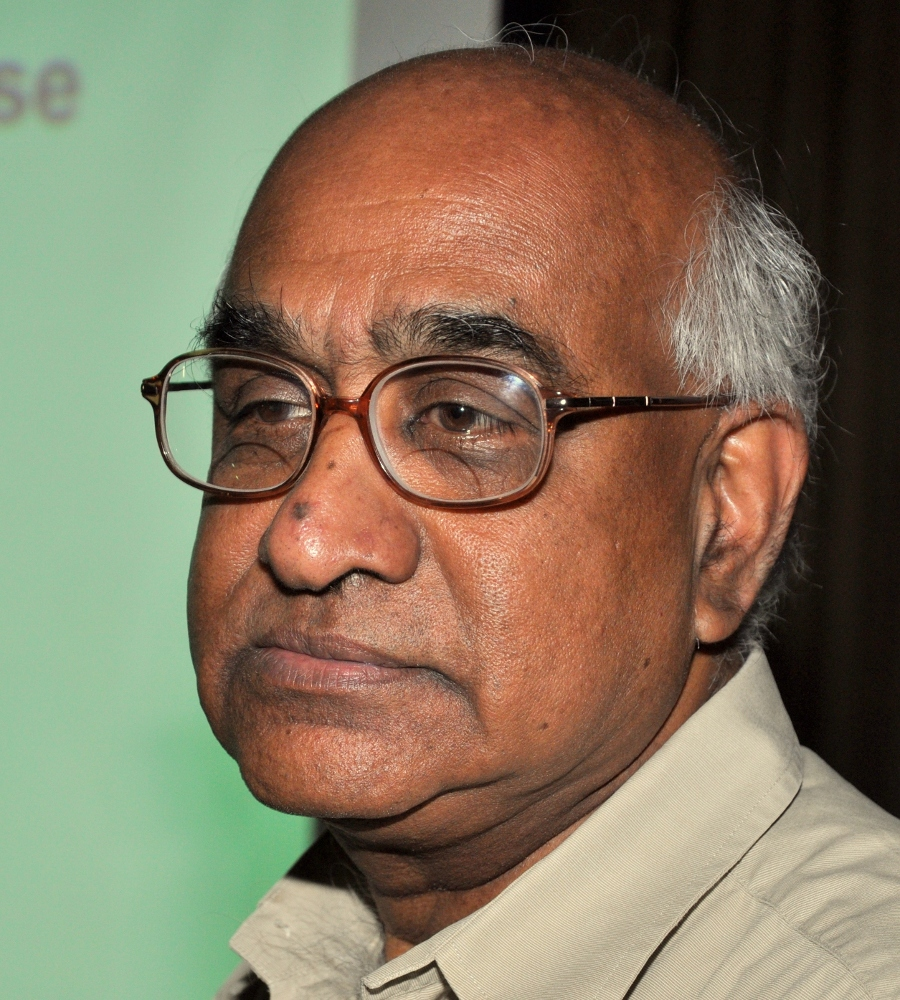
T. V. Ramakrishnan

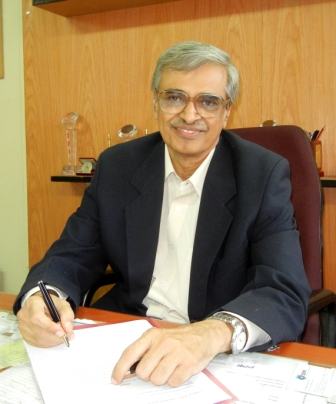
Kamanio Chattopadhyay

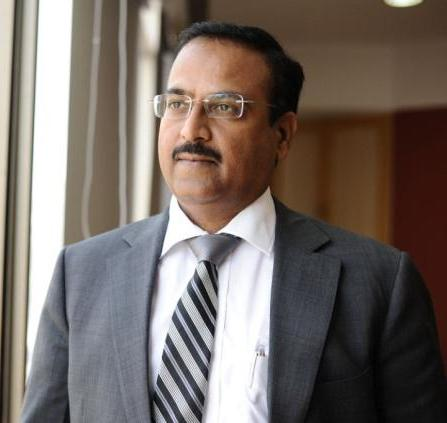
Tapan Singhal

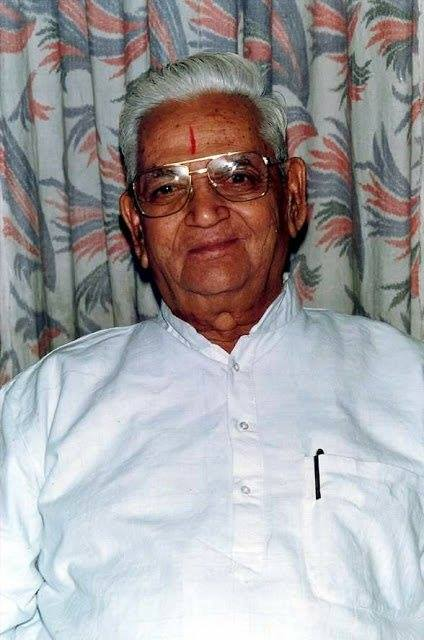
Shyam Sunder Surolia

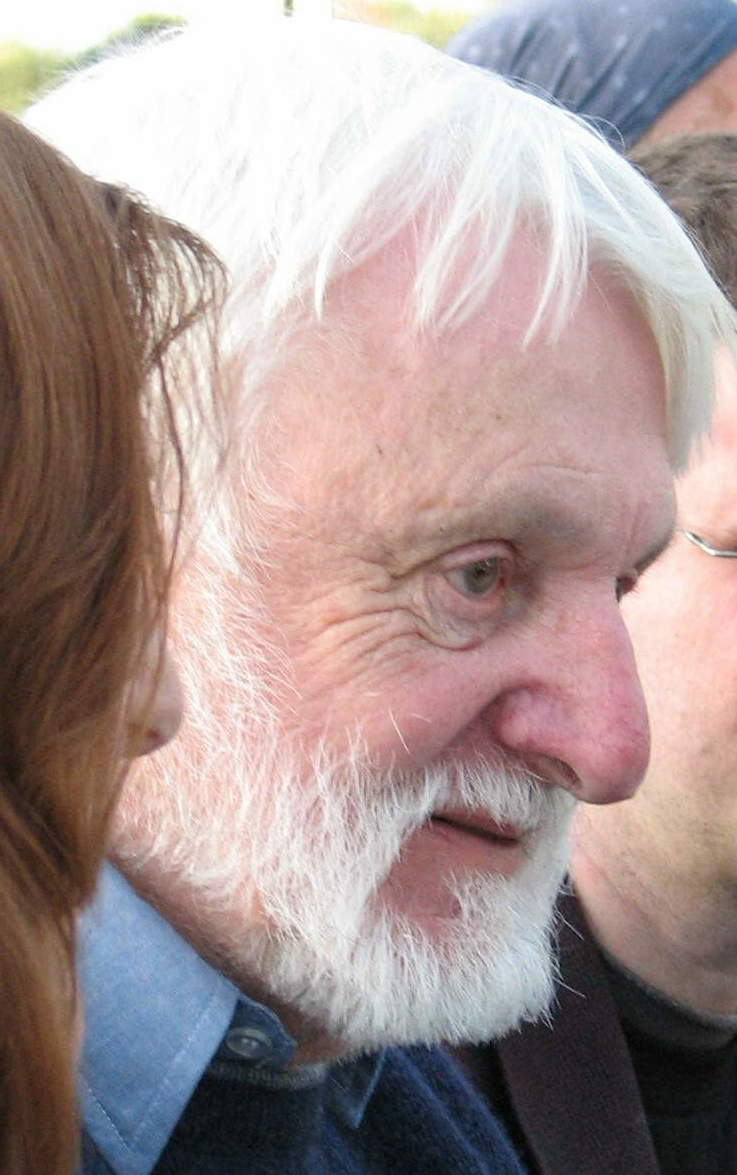
Robert M. Pirsig

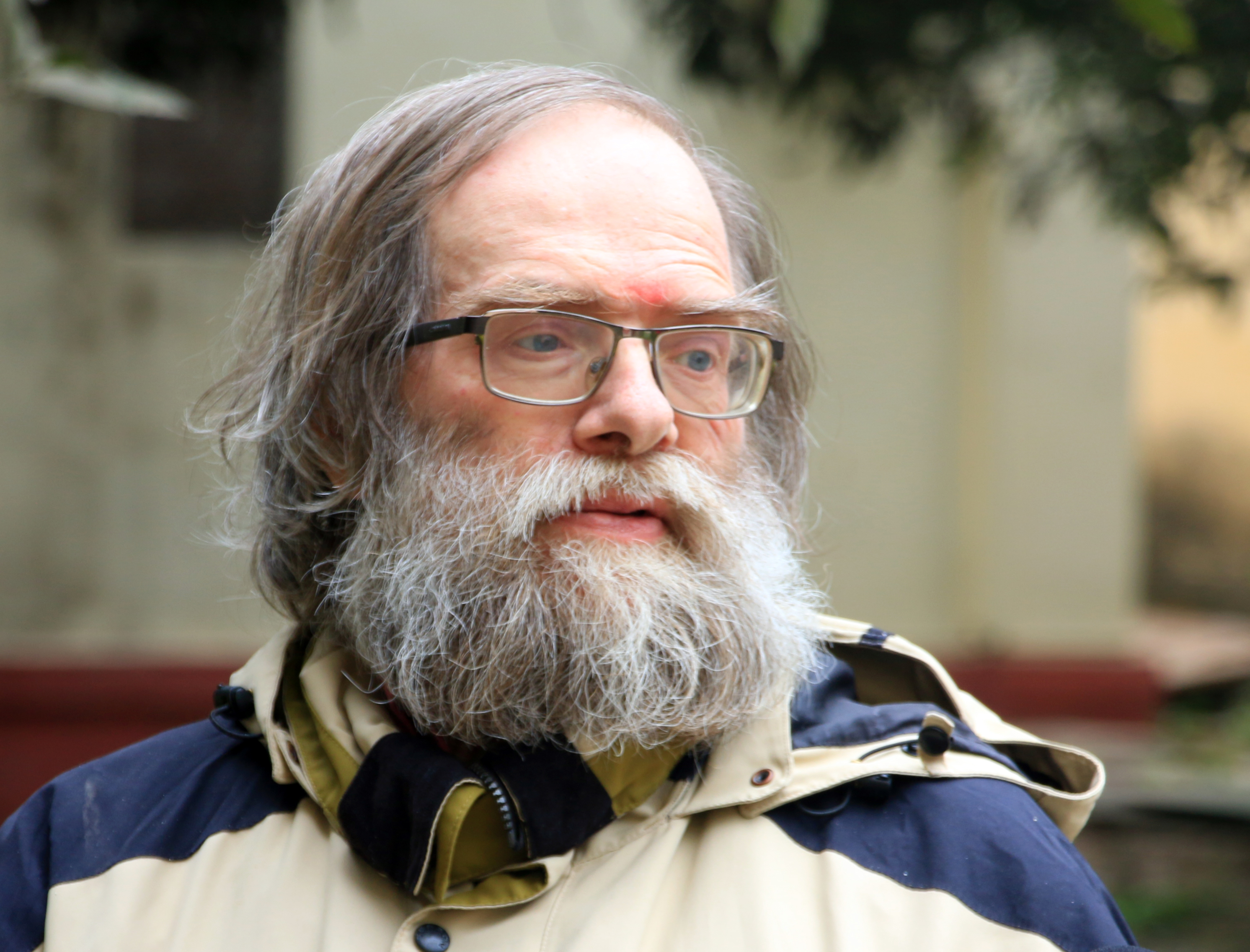
Koenraad Elst

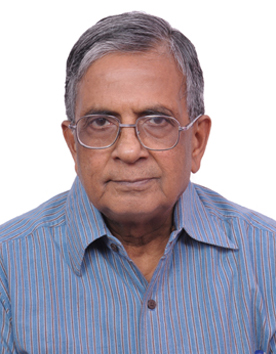
Kota Harinarayana

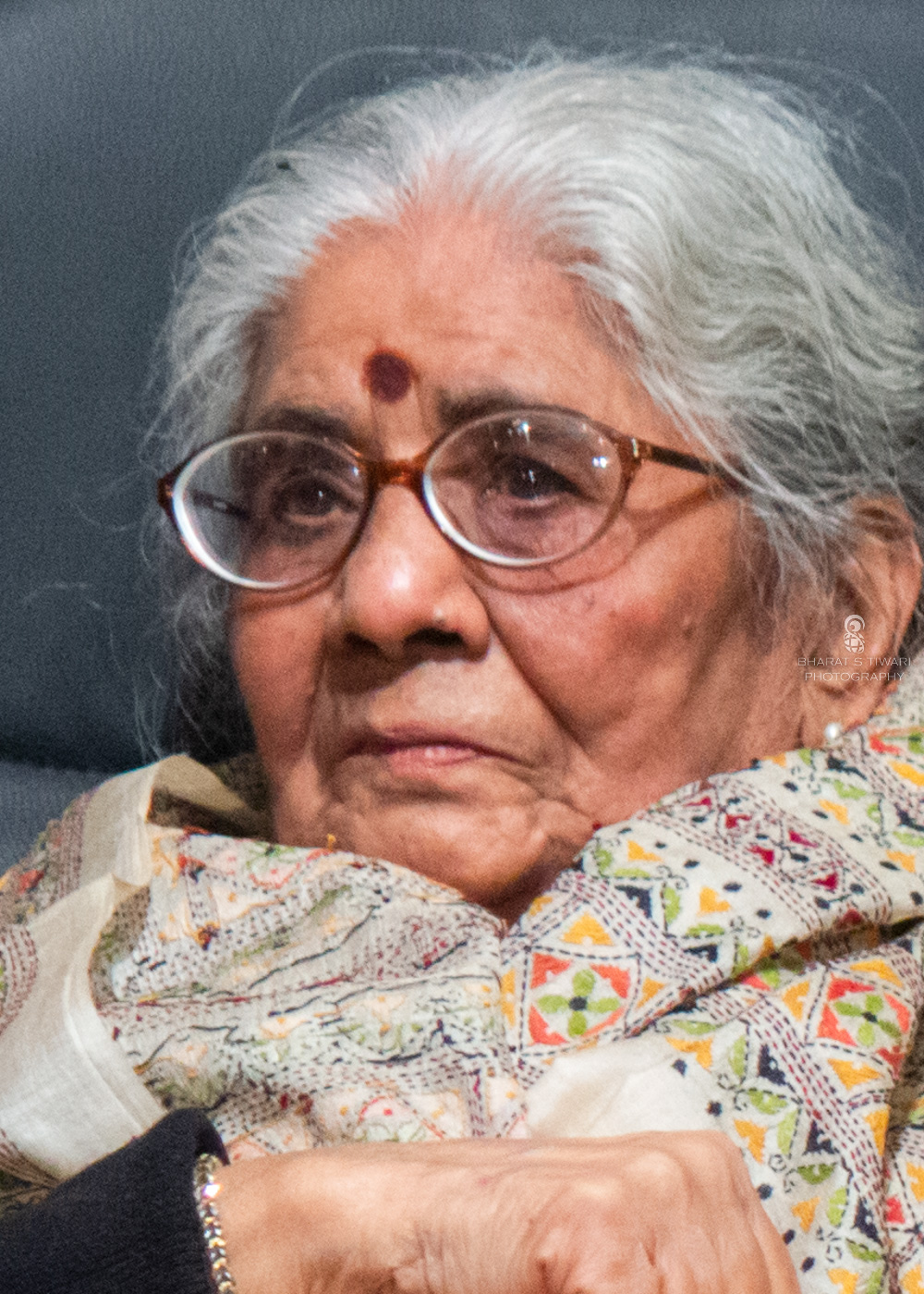
Mannu Bhandari

== In popular culture ==
- 2019 Hindi film Super 30 starring Hrithik Roshan was shot in BHU library.

== See also ==
- List of universities in India
- List of educational institutions in Varanasi
