= Giridhar Malaviya =

Indian judge (1936–2024)

Justice Giridhar Malaviya
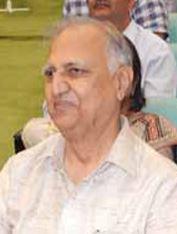
- Malaviya in 2014

Chancellor of Banaras Hindu University
- In office November 2018 – 18 November 2024
- Nominated by: Banaras Hindu University Court
- Appointed by: President of India
- Deputy: VC-BHU: Sudhir K. Jain (2022–2024); Rakesh Bhatnagar (2018–2021)
- Preceded by: Karan Singh

Judge of Allahabad High Court
- In office 14 March 1988 – 2001

Chairperson of Ganga Mahasabha
- In office 2012 – 18 November 2024

Personal details
- Born: 14 October 1936 Benares, Benares State, British India
- Died: 18 November 2024 (aged 88)
- Children: Manoj Malaviya, IPS

Giridhar Malaviya (14 November 1936 – 18 November 2024) was an Indian judge of Allahabad High Court and former Chancellor of Banaras Hindu University.

== Background ==
Malaviya was a grandson of Madan Mohan Malaviya (founder of Banaras Hindu University) and only son of Govind Malaviya (6th vice-chancellor of Banaras Hindu University). He was born on 14 November 1936 in Varanasi. Malaviya was a graduate of Political Science & Law from the Banaras Hindu University.

Giridhar Malaviya's son Manoj Malaviya is an Indian Police Service officer, who served as Director General of Police of West Bengal Police.

Malaviya died on 18 November 2024, at the age of 88.

== Career ==
Giridhar Malaviya was appointed a judge of Allahabad High Court on 14 March 1988. After retirement, in November 2018, he was elected unanimously as the chancellor of Banaras Hindu University by the University Court.

Malaviya was one of the proposers of Narendra Modi for his candidacy from Varanasi constituency in the 2014 Lok Sabha Elections.

Malaviya was actively engaged in Ganga cleaning mission. He was the chairperson of the committee constituted to prepare a draft of Ganga Act. He was also the chairperson of Ganga Mahasabha.
