= Manoj Malaviya =

Director General of West Bengal Police

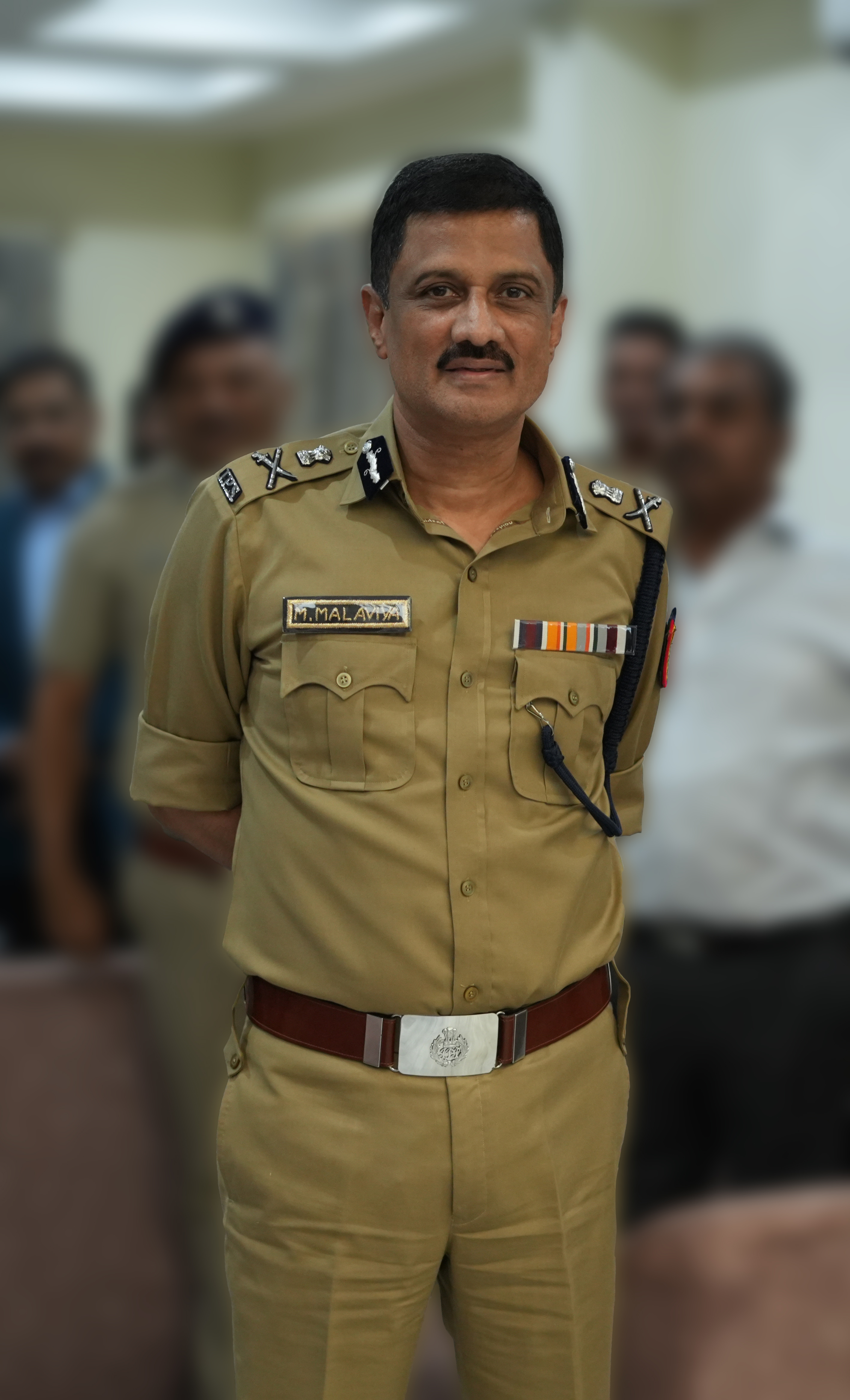
- Relatives: Giridhar Malaviya (father); Madan Mohan Malaviya (great-grandfather)
- Police career
- Country: India
- Status: State Police Advisor, West Bengal
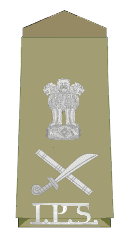
- Rank: Director General of Police
- Batch: 1986
- Awards: Police Medal for Meritorious Service; Police Medal for Outstanding Service

Manoj Malaviya is a 1986 batch Indian Police Service officer who served as Director General of the West Bengal Police from August 2021 to December 2023.

== Personal life ==
Malaviya is the son of Giridhar Malaviya, grandson of Govind Malaviya, and great-grandson of Madan Mohan Malaviya.

== Career ==
Malaviya started his career in 1986 as a Sub-Divisional Police Officer in Shantiniketan. He served in several positions, including as Deputy Commissioner in the Detective Department of the Kolkata Police, as the Superintendent of Police of Nadia, Midnapore, and Bardhaman districts, and as the Additional Commissioner of the Bureau of Civil Aviation Security in Delhi.

He was appointed Director-General of West Bengal Police in August 2021; his appointment was made permanent in December 2021 and he held the position till December 2023, and was succeeded by Rajeev Kumar. He was then appointed to a three-year term as State Police Advisor.

== Awards ==
- In 2003, he was awarded the Police Medal for Meritorious Service.
- In 2022, he was awarded the Chief Minister Police Medal for Outstanding Service.
