= Vice-Chancellor of Banaras Hindu University =

Chief Executive Administrator of Banaras Hindu University

Vice-Chancellor of the Banaras Hindu University
- Hindi: Kashi Hindu Vishvavidyaalay ke Kulpati
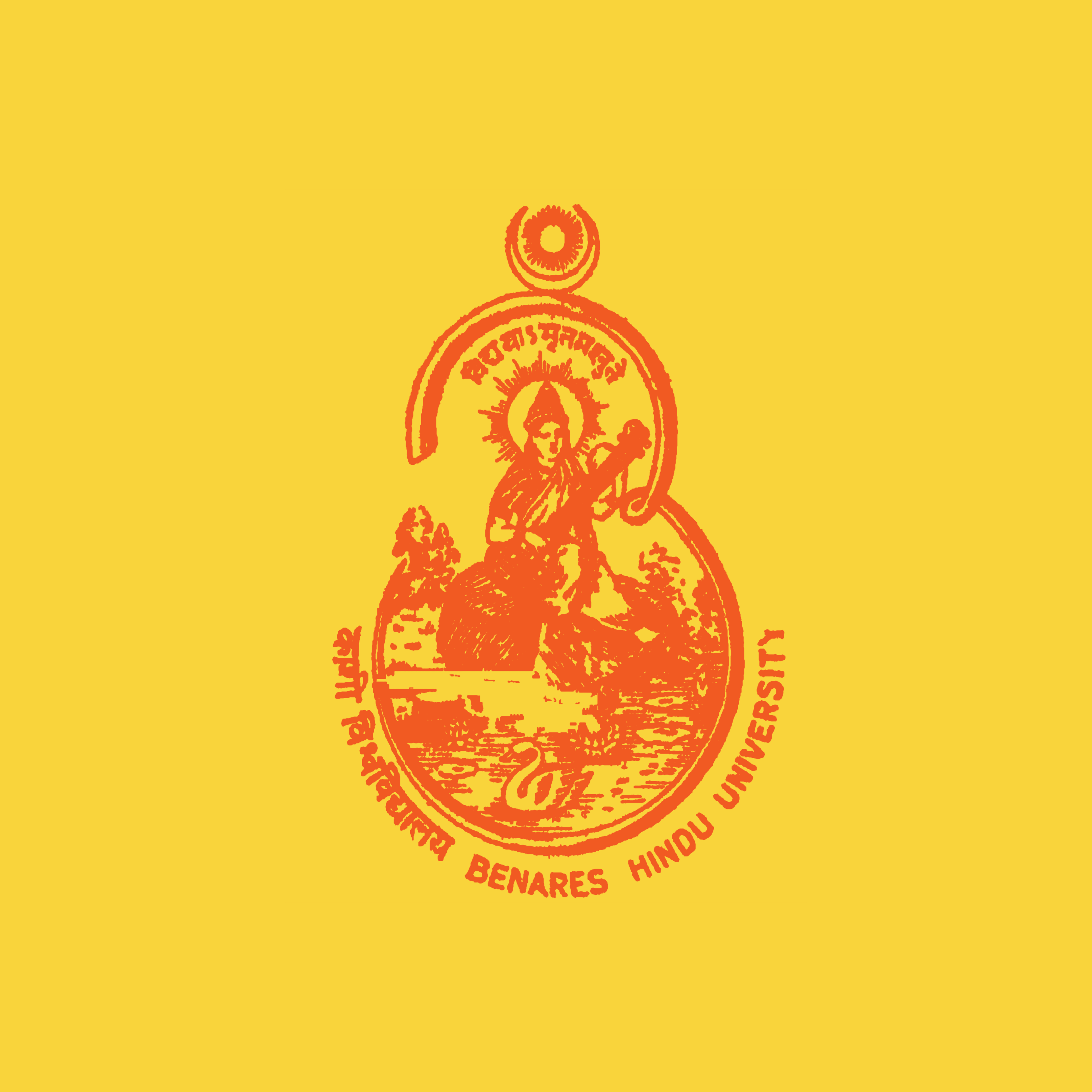
- BHU Flag flies atop vice-chancellor's car and office

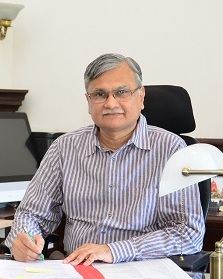
- Incumbent; Ajit Kumar Chaturvedi since 1 August 2025
- Style: The Hon'ble Vice-Chancellor
- Type: Vice-chancellor
- Status: Chief Executive of the Banaras Hindu University
- Abbreviation: VC-BHU
- Member of: Executive Council, Academic Council, and Finance Committee of the Banaras Hindu University
- Reports to: Executive Council, University Court, and President of India
- Residence: Cochin House, Banaras Hindu University, Varanasi, India
- Seat: Central Office, Banaras Hindu University
- Nominator: Ministry of Education
- Appointer: President of India; (Visitor of the university)
- Term length: Three years; Second term of fresh appointment possible.
- Constituting instrument: Banaras Hindu University Act of 1915
- Formation: 1 April 1916
- First holder: Sir Sunder Lal
- Deputy: The Rector of the Banaras Hindu University
- Salary: ₹210,000 (US$2,200) monthly. Excluding other allowances
- Website: Official website

The vice-chancellor of Banaras Hindu University (VC-BHU) is the chief administrator, and a full-time salaried officer of the Banaras Hindu University. The vice-chancellor derives their powers from sections 7(B) and 7(C) of the Banaras Hindu University Act (BHU Act) and from the statutes of the said act.

Although the chancellor of Banaras Hindu University, preceding the vice-chancellor, is "head of the university" under the BHU Act, it is only a titular position. The vice-chancellor is the principal executive and principal academic officer of the university. She or he is the ex-officio chairperson of the Executive Council, the Academic Council, and the Finance Committee of the university.

Applications for the appointment of vice-chancellor of Banaras Hindu University are invited openly by the Ministry of Education, which shortlists candidates interviewed by its search committee. The shortlisted candidates are recommended to the President of India. Upon their satisfaction, the president appoints the vice-chancellor. Per the BHU Act, vice-chancellors of the university have a three-year tenure in the office. They are, however, eligible for a second term of appointment upon expiration of the first term with preferably not more than 67 years of age. The maximum age for holding the office is 70 years. When a vice-chancellor leaves office by the means of retirement, resignation, death, or ill-health, the rector assumes the office as officiating vice-chancellor to avoid interregnum.

During the British Indian and Indian Dominion administration, the appointments were made by the Governor General.

There have been 29 vice-chancellors since the establishment of the university. Ajit Kumar Chaturvedi was appointed as the 29th Vice-Chancellor in July 2025, and took charge on 1 August 2025.

== Chronological list ==
The vice-chancellors of Banaras Hindu University, in chronological order, are as follows:

Vice-Chancellors of Banaras Hindu University
No.	Image	Name	Period of office		Remarks
1	Portrait of Sir Sunderlal	Rai Bahadur Sir Sunder Lal CIE	1 April 1916	13 April 1918	Founding vice-chancellor; Sir Sunderlal Hospital in the university named after him
2	Portrait of Sir PSS Iyer	Sir P.S. Sivaswami Iyer KCSI CIE	13 April 1918	8 May 1919	Presided as the vice-chancellor at university's first convocation
3	Portrait of MM Malviya	Pandit Madan Mohan Malaviya Bharat Ratna	29 November 1919	20 August 1939	Served for more than 19 years; Founder of the university
4		Sir Sarvepalli Radhakrishnan Bharat Ratna	17 September 1939	16 January 1948	Served for more than 8 years; 1st Vice President of India, later went on to become 2nd President of India
5	Portrait of Amarnath Jha	Amarnath Jha Padma Bhushan	27 February 1948	5 December 1948	
6	Portrait of Govind Malviya	Pandit Govind Malaviya	6 December 1948	21 November 1951	Alumnus of the Banaras Hindu University; Youngest son of university founder Madan Mohan Malaviya
7	Portrait of Acharya Nand Dev	Acharya Narendra Dev	6 December 1951	31 May 1954	
8	Portrait of Sir CPR Iyer	Sir C. P. Ramaswami Iyer KCSI KCIE	1 July 1954	2 July 1956	
9	Portrait of VS Jha	Veni Shankar Jha Padma Bhushan	3 July 1956	16 April 1960	
10	Portrait of NH Bhagwati	N. H. Bhagwati	16 April 1960	15 April 1966	
11	Triguna Sen on a postage stamp	Triguna Sen Padma Bhushan	9 October 1966	15 March 1967	
12	Portrait of AC Joshi	A. C. Joshi	1 September 1967	31 July 1969	
13	Portrait of Kalu Lal Shrimali	Kalu Lal Shrimali Padma Vibhushan	1 November 1969	31 January 1977	Alumnus of the Banaras Hindu University
14	Portrait of Moti Lal Dhar	Moti Lal Dhar	2 February 1977	15 December 1977	First and only Kashmiri Pandit to hold this position
15	Photo of Hari Narayan	Hari Narain Padma Shri	15 May 1978	14 May 1981	
16	Portrait of Iqbal Narain	Iqbal Narain	19 October 1981	29 April 1985	
17	Photograph of RP Rastogi	R. P. Rastogi	30 April 1985	29 April 1991	
18	Portrait of CS Jha	C. S. Jha	1 May 1991	14 June 1993	
19	A photo of DN Mishra	D. N. Mishra	8 February 1994	27 June 1995	
20	Photo of Hari Gautam	Hari Gautam	2 August 1995	25 August 1998	
21	Photo depicting YC Simhadri	Y. C. Simhadri	31 August 1998	20 February 2002	
22	Patcha Rao's photo	Patcha Ramachandra Rao	20 February 2002	19 February 2005	Alumnus of the Banaras Hindu University
23	A photo of Panjab Singh	Panjab Singh	3 May 2005	7 May 2008	
24	Portrait of DP Singh	D. P. Singh	8 May 2008	21 August 2011	India Today-Nielsen ranked the university best in India
25		Lalji Singh Padma Shri, FNA, FASc	22 August 2011	21 August 2014	Alumnus of the Banaras Hindu University; Undertook various reforms in the university; Voluntarily received only a token salary of ₹ 1 per month
26	GC Tripathi in convocation attire	Girish Chandra Tripathi	27 November 2014	26 November 2017	Banaras Hindu University women's rights protest during his tenure
27	Rakesh Bhatnagar in his office	Rakesh Bhatnagar	28 March 2018	28 March 2021	
28	Photo of Sudhir Jain	Sudhir K. Jain Padma Shri	7 January 2022	7 January 2025	NIRF ranking of the university dropped from third to sixth after five years
29		Ajit Kumar Chaturvedi	1 August 2025	Incumbent	Worked previously at the university.

== Timeline ==
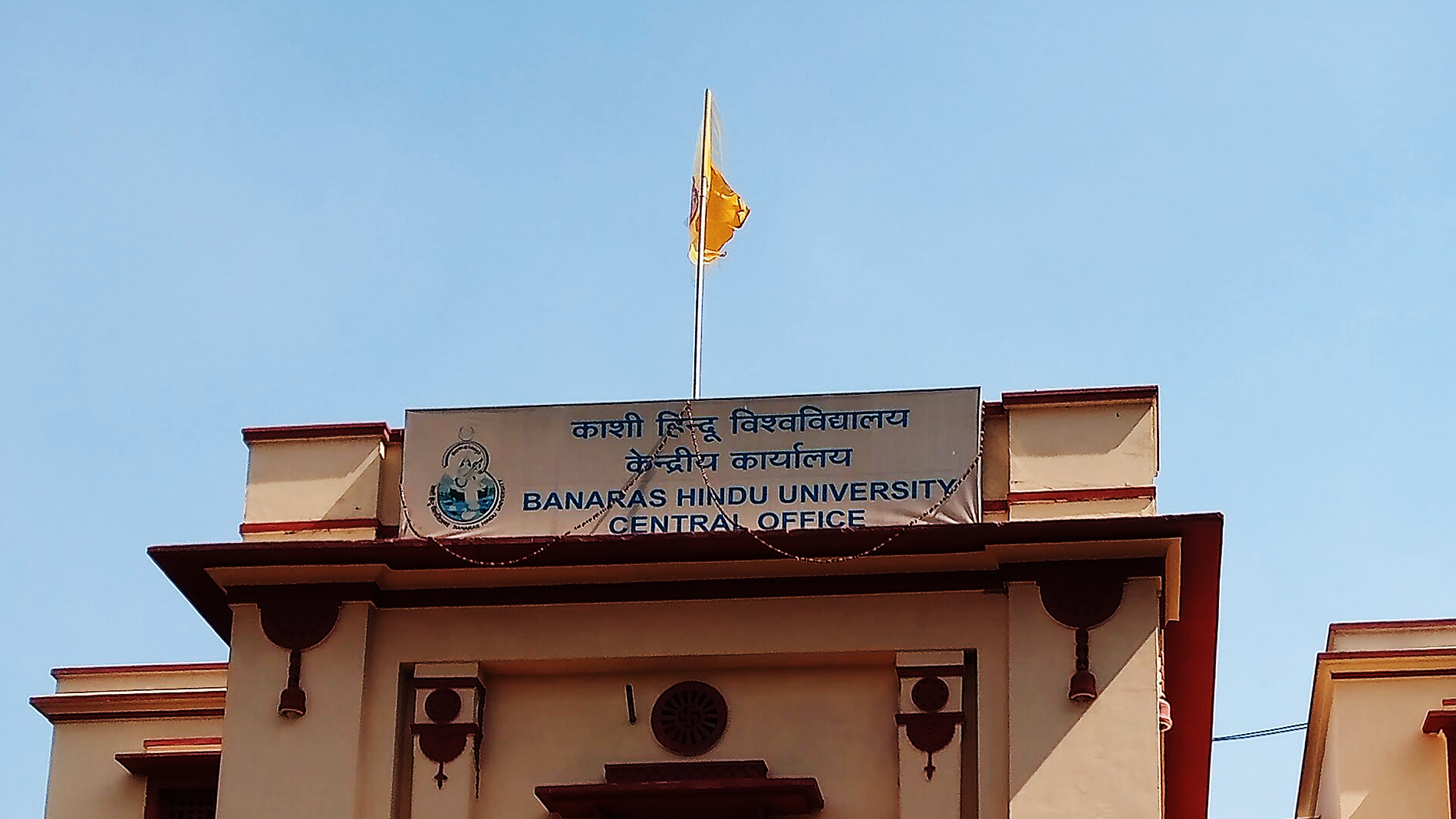
Central Registry in the university is the seat/office of the vice-chancellor.

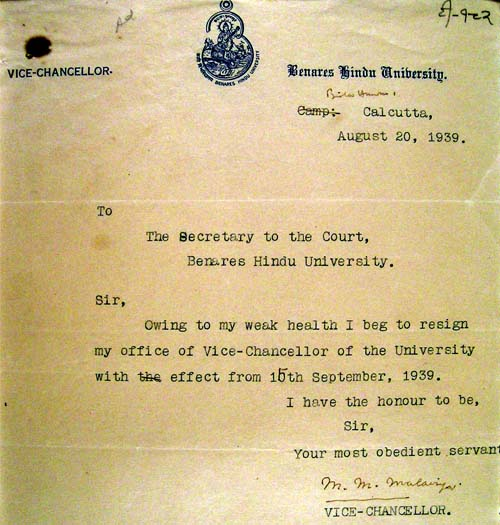
Madan Mohan Malviya resigned as the vice-chancellor in 1939 due to poor health

Vice-chancellors of Banaras Hindu University

== See also ==
- List of Banaras Hindu University people
