= Creative Commons India =

Country-level Chapter of Creative Commons in India

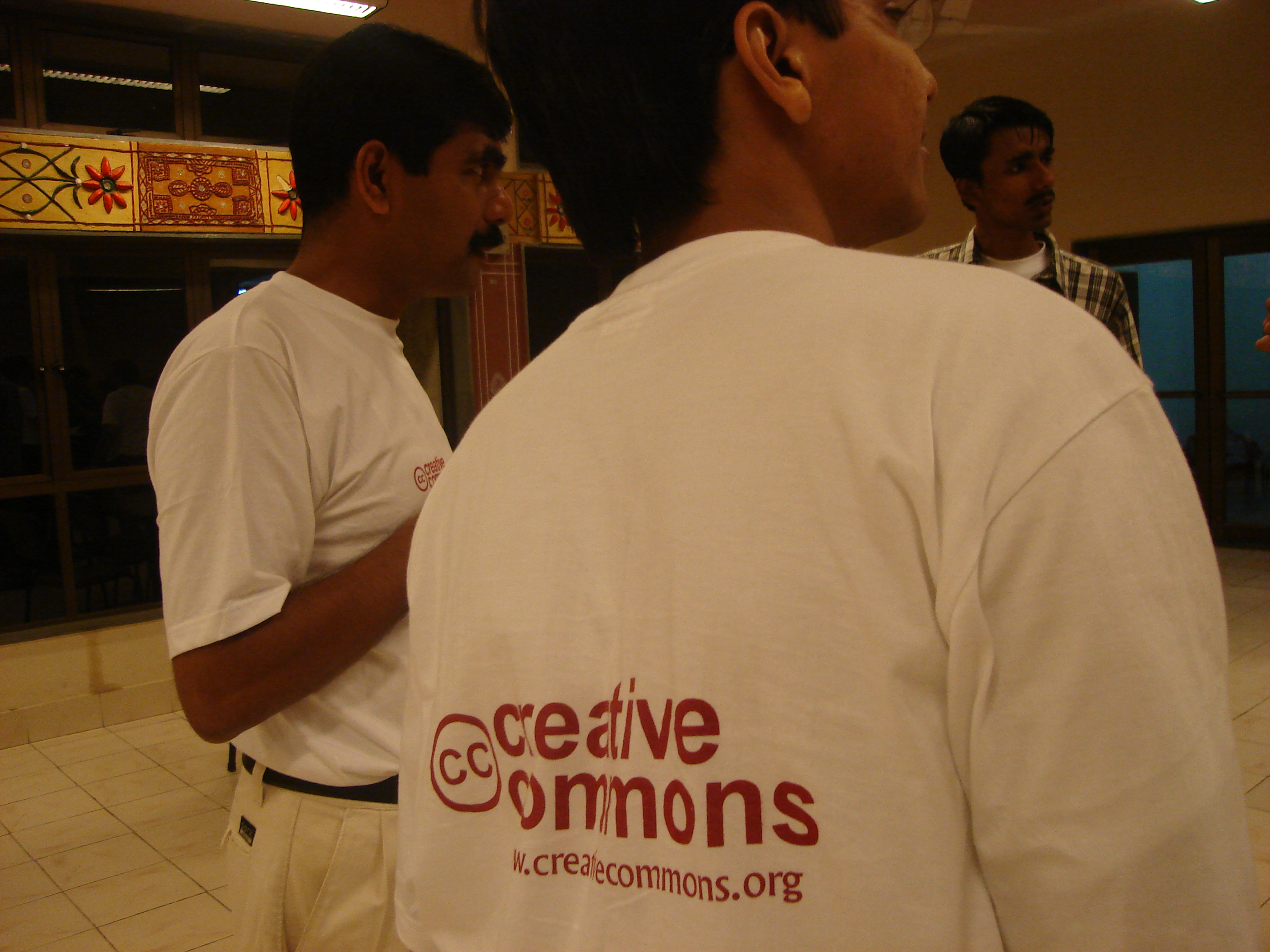
A group of volunteers wearing Creative Commons t-shirts in Mumbai 2007

Creative Commons India Chapter is the country-level Chapter of Creative Commons in India. It organises online and offline events on various aspects related to open content, Open Educational Resources, Creative Commons licensed publishing and the use of Open Access textbooks in schools.

== History ==
CC India Chapter was set up under its current team on September 1, 2018. Its Chapter Lead is Savithri Singh. Subhashish Panigrahi is representative to the Global Network Council.

Earlier, the India Chapter was relaunched in 2013. It was originally launched in India in 2007, and by 2013, the Creative Commons had been tailor-made for India law. Wikimedia India, the Acharya Narendra Dev College, and the Centre for Internet and Society (India) were the key organisations were the key part of the Chapter with a focus respectively on outreach, open educational research, and legal support.

The CC India network was initially housed at IIT Bombay. Its goals have included "raising awareness on licenses and open education resources, connecting with photography communities, content donation and participating in affiliate network."

== Initiatives ==
Among the initiatives taken up in India on the Creative Commons front are:

- In 2019, the Indian State of Odisha (earlier Orissa), announced that it had licensed a total of 21 dictionaries, in all 21 Indigenous languages that are spoken in the province, under CC BY (Creative Commons Attribution) 4.0 license. This meant that these works would be opened for "adaptation, distribution, and remixing by anyone".
- Pratham Books, a nonprofit publisher with social goals, working since 1994 to secure primary education for every child in India and seeking to publish high-quality books for children at an affordable cost, has been releasing its books under Creative Commons licenses.
- NROER, or the National Repository of Open Educational Resources, an initiative in Open Education efforts, (under the Creative Commons) which is intended to help "reach the unreached and empower all by providing resources in multiple languages and formats. As of April 2020, the NROER had some 14,527 files in different languages, comprising 401 collections, 2779 documents, 1345 interactive content pieces, 1,664 audio files, 2,586 images and 6,153 videos.
- NCERT has taken the initiative of declaring that NROER will carry CC-BY-SA license, which can also be reused for commercial purposes.

== Issues raised ==
Among the issues raised by the Creative Commons (India Chapter), related groups and allies, have been

- Wikimedia India Chapter raising the issue of there not enough information out in the public domain.
- Appeal to remove copyright on Census of India.
- Urging the Press Information Bureau to issue under Creative Commons licenses information available with it about Indian history and current issues.
- Calling on the Indian Space Research Organisation to release its copyrighted information under Creative Commons licenses, as done by NASA in the United States.
- Journals, text and multimedia produced by government departments like Prasar Bharti and AIR can be released under an appropriate Creative Commons license.
- Access to learning materials is seen as a big issue in India.
