= Girish Chandra Tripathi =

26th Vice-chancellor of BHU (2014-2017)

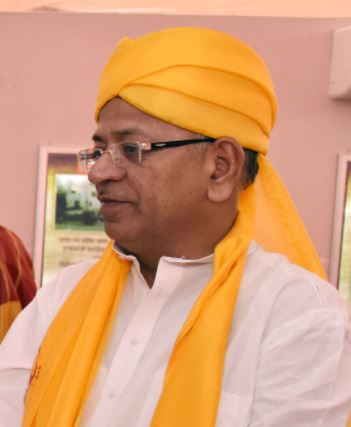
- Tripathi as the VC of BHU

Chairman of Uttar Pradesh State Council of Higher Education
- Incumbent
- Assumed office 25 January 2020
- Appointed by: Government of Uttar Pradesh

26th Vice-Chancellor of Banaras Hindu University
- In office 27 November 2014 – 26 November 2017
- Appointed by: Pranab Mukherjee
- Preceded by: Lalji Singh
- Succeeded by: Rakesh Bhatnagar

Girish Chandra Tripathi (G.C. Tripathi) is the chairman of the Higher Education Council Uttar Pradesh. Previously, he was the 26th vice-chancellor of Banaras Hindu University (27 November 2014 to 26 November 2017) and professor of Economics at the University of Allahabad.

== See also ==
- List of vice-chancellors of Banaras Hindu University
- Banaras Hindu University women's rights protest
