= Hari Gautam =

Chancellor of SLBSNSU & former VC of BHU

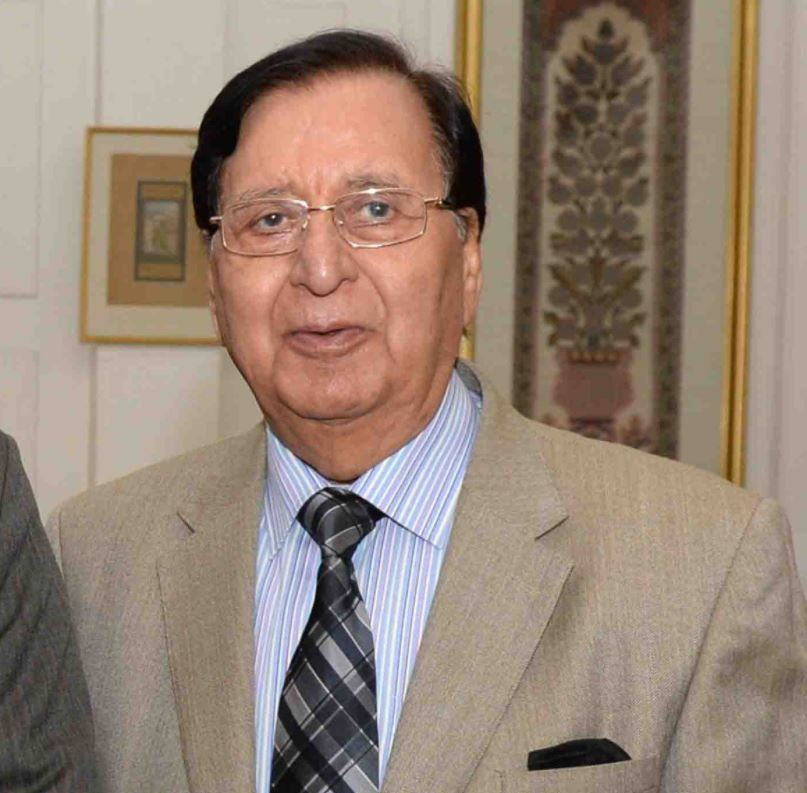

20th Vice-Chancellor of Banaras Hindu University
- In office 2 August 1995 – 25 August 1998
- Appointed by: Shankar Dayal Sharma
- Preceded by: D. N. Mishra
- Succeeded by: Y. C. Simhadri

Personal details
- Occupation: cardiac surgeon
- Known for: Chancellor of Shri Lal Bahadur Shastri National Sanskrit University

Hari Pratap Gautam, commonly Hari Gautam, is a cardiac surgeon currently serving as chancellor of the Shri Lal Bahadur Shastri National Sanskrit University, who also served as the 20th and former vice-chancellor of the Banaras Hindu University (1995–98).

== Career ==
Hari Gautam has previously served as the vice-chancellor of King George's Medical University, president of National Academy of Medical Sciences, chairman of the University Grants Commission (1999-2002), and the 20th vice-chancellor of Banaras Hindu University (1995–98).

== See also ==
- List of vice-chancellors of Banaras Hindu University
