= R. P. Rastogi =

Indian scientist and academic administrator

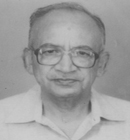

17th Vice-Chancellor of Banaras Hindu University
- In office 30 April 1985 – 29 April 1991
- Appointed by: Zail Singh
- Preceded by: Iqbal Narain
- Succeeded by: C.S. Jha

Personal details
- Education: Lucknow University

Raghunath Prasad Rastogi (R.P. Rastogi) (born 1926) was a chemical scientist and academic administrator. He was the 17th Vice-Chancellor of Banaras Hindu University for 6 years from 1985 to 1991.

== Biography ==
Rastogi obtained from the Lucknow University B.Sc., M.Sc. and PhD in 1946, 1948, and 1952 respectively. Hes pecialised in Non-equilibrium thermodynamics, Rocket propellant chemistry.

He died on 8 April 2018.
