= Triguna Sen =

Indian politician

Triguna Kumar Sen
- ত্রিগুণা কুমার সেন
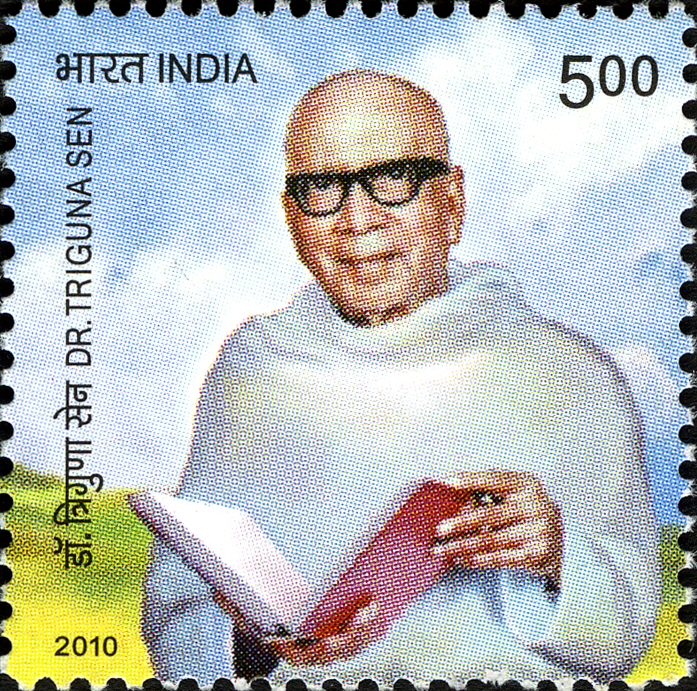

Union Minister of Education
- In office 16 March 1967 – 14 February 1969
- Prime Minister: Indira Gandhi
- Preceded by: Fakhruddin Ali Ahmed
- Succeeded by: V. K. R. V. Rao

Vice-Chancellor of Banaras Hindu University
- In office 9 October 1966 – 15 March 1967
- Appointed by: Sarvepalli Radhakrishnan
- Preceded by: Natwarlal H. Bhagwati
- Succeeded by: A C Joshi

Personal details
- Born: 24 December 1905 Zakiganj, Assam, British India
- Died: 11 January 1998 (aged 92) Kolkata, West Bengal, India
- Parent(s): Golok Chandra Sen (Father), Sushilasundari Debi (Mother)
- Education: Jadavpur University, LMU Munich, Vijaygarh Jyotish Ray College
- Occupation: Academics, Professor, Educators, politician, activists
- Awards: Padma Bhushan (1965)

Triguna Sen (24 December 1905 – 11 January 1998) was the 6th Union Minister for Education for the Government of India. He was awarded the Padma Bhushan in 1965. He was first Vice-Chancellor of Jadavpur University (from 1956 to 1966) and 11th Vice-Chancellor of Banaras Hindu University. He was a member of the Rajya Sabha from 1967 to 1974. He was a member of Governing Body as a Guest lecturer for Vijaygarh Jyotish Ray College (Jadavpur).
