= Iqbal Narain =

Indian academic, 16th Vice-chancellor of BHU (1981-1985)

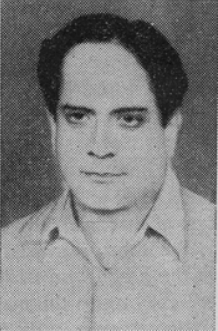

16th Vice-Chancellor of Banaras Hindu University
- In office 19 October 1981 – 29 April 1985
- Appointed by: Neelam Sanjiva Reddy
- Preceded by: Hari Narain
- Succeeded by: R.P. Rastogi

Iqbal Narain (1930–1996) was an Indian academic, social scientist, and the 16th Vice-Chancellor of Banaras Hindu University. He was the chief editor of Political Science Review, member of several government committees, and wrote articles in Economic and Political Weekly. He has also served as the Vice-Chancellor of the University of Rajasthan. Narain died in 1996.
