= Dhirendra Pal Singh =

Indian academic administrator

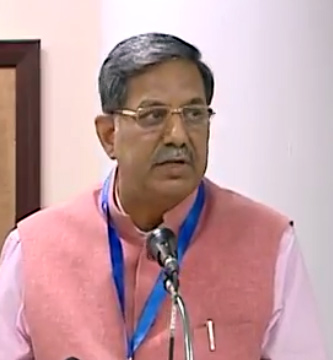
- Singh in 2018

Chancellor of Tata Institute of Social Sciences
- Incumbent
- Assumed office 28 April 2024
- Preceded by: Position Established

Chairman of University Grants Commission
- In office 2018–2021
- Preceded by: Ved Prakash
- Succeeded by: M. Jagadesh Kumar

Director of National Assessment and Accreditation Council
- In office 2015–2017
- Preceded by: A. N. Rai
- Succeeded by: Dr. S. C. Sharma

Vice Chancellor of Devi Ahilya Vishwavidyalaya
- In office 2012–2015
- Preceded by: Prof.Ak Singh
- Succeeded by: Dr. Narendra Kumar Dhakad

24th Vice-Chancellor of Banaras Hindu University
- In office 8 May 2008 – 21 August 2011
- Appointed by: Pratibha Patil
- Preceded by: Panjab Singh
- Succeeded by: Lalji Singh

Vice Chancellor of Dr. Hari Singh Gour University (Central University)
- In office 7 October 2004 – 7 May 2008
- Preceded by: Santosh Kumar
- Succeeded by: Namdeo Gajbhiye

Personal details
- Born: 7 December 1956 (age 69)

Dhirendra Pal Singh, known as D. P. Singh, is an Indian academic administrator. On the 22nd of August 2022, Uttar Pradesh Government named him as the Education Adviser to Chief Minister and on the 28th of April 2024 he was appointed as Chancellor of the Tata Institute of Social Sciences (TISS) by the Union Ministry of Education, Government of India for a term of five years until the 30th of April 2029.

He has served as vice-chancellor of three different universities, namely Dr. Hari Singh Gour University, Banaras Hindu University and Devi Ahilya Vishwavidyalaya. He is the former director of National Assessment and Accreditation Council (NAAC). He has also served as the chairman of the University Grants Commission (UGC).

== Career ==
Singh served as vice-chancellor (VC) of three different universities. From 2004 to 2008 he served as VC of Dr. Hari Singh Gour University, a Central University located in Sagar, Madhya Pradesh. From 2008 to 2011 he served as VC of Banaras Hindu University in Varanasi, Uttar Pradesh and finally from 2012 to 2015 he served as VC of Devi Ahilya Vishwavidyalaya in Indore, Madhya Pradesh. In August 2015 he was appointed director of the National Assessment and Accreditation Council (NAAC) for a term of five years. However, in December 2017 he was elevated to the position of chairman of the University Grants Commission for a period of five years. On 28 April 2024, he was appointed as Chancellor of the Tata Institute of Social Sciences (TISS) by the Union Ministry of Education, Government of India for a term of five years.
