= Moti Lal Dhar =

Indian chemist (1914–2002)

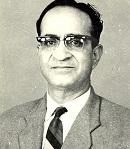

14th Vice-Chancellor of Banaras Hindu University
- In office 2 February 1977 – 15 December 1977
- Appointed by: Fakhruddin Ali Ahmed
- Preceded by: Kalu Lal Shrimali
- Succeeded by: Hari Narain

Moti Lal Dhar (22 October 1914 – 20 January 2002) was an Indian chemist and academic administrator. He was director of the Central Drug Research Institute (CDRI), Lucknow, from 1962 until his retirement in 1972 to serve as vice-chancellor of Banaras Hindu University.

== Early life and education ==
Moti Lal Dhar was born on 22 October 1914 at Srinagar, Kashmir. He earned his MSc degree from Punjab University, and continued his studies in the United Kingdom on a scholarship from the Jammu and Kashmir State Government. After obtaining a PhD from the University of London in 1940, he returned to India. In the late 1950s, he was also a visiting scientist in the laboratory of Linus Pauling at the California Institute of Technology.

== Professional career ==
After his return to India in 1940, he joined the Drug Research Laboratory at Jammu, where he worked for approximately ten years as a chemist. In 1950, he joined the newly established Central Drug Research Institute (CDRI) at Lucknow as a scientific officer. In 1962, he was appointed the director of the institute. He retired from CDRI in 1974, after having worked there for 24 years, of which he was the director for the last twelve.

After his retirement, he was appointed the Chairman of the Board of Governors of the Indian Institute of Technology, Kanpur (1974–1976). Later, he served as the vice-chancellor of Banaras Hindu University.
