= Hari Narain =

Indian geophysicist and former Vice Chancellor of BHU

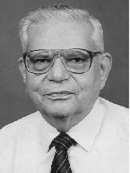

15th Vice-Chancellor of Banaras Hindu University
- In office 15 May 1978 – 14 May 1981
- Appointed by: Neelam Sanjiva Reddy
- Preceded by: Moti Lal Dhar
- Succeeded by: Iqbal Narain

Personal details
- Education: Allahabad University Sydney University ISM Dhanbad

Hari Narain (1922 -2011) was a renowned Indian geophysicist and 15th Vice-Chancellor of Banaras Hindu University.

== Education ==
Narain did his B.Sc., M.Sc., and D.Phil in 1950 from the University of Allahabad under KS Krishnan. He later earned his Ph.D. from Sydney University in 1954 and D.Sc from Indian School of Mines, Dhanbad in 1978.

== See also ==
- List of vice-chancellors of Banaras Hindu University
- Geophysics
