= Veni Shankar Jha =

Indian educationist

Veni Shankar Jha Padma Bhushan
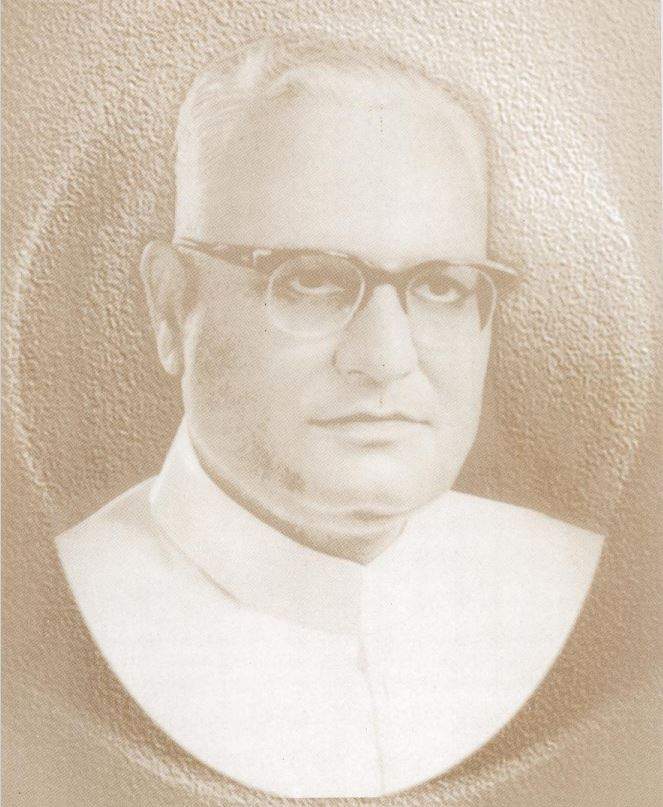
- Prof. Jha as the VC of BHU

9th Vice-Chancellor of Banaras Hindu University
- In office 3 July 1956 – 16 April 1960
- Appointed by: Rajendra Prasad
- Preceded by: Sir C.P. Ramaswami Iyer
- Succeeded by: Natwarlal H. Bhagwati

Personal details
- Born: Madhya Pradesh, India
- Occupation: Educationist
- Known for: services in Education sector
- Awards: 1971 Padma Bhushan

Veni Shankar Jha was an Indian educationist. He served as the director of public instruction of the Central Provinces and Berar and was the vice chancellor of Banaras Hindu University from 3 July 1956 to 6 April 1960. The Government of India awarded him Padma Bhushan, the third highest Indian civilian award, in 1971.

== See also ==
- List of Vice-Chancellors of Banaras Hindu University
