= Natwarlal H. Bhagwati =

Indian judge (1894–1970)

Hon'ble Mr. Justice Natwarlal Harilal Bhagwati
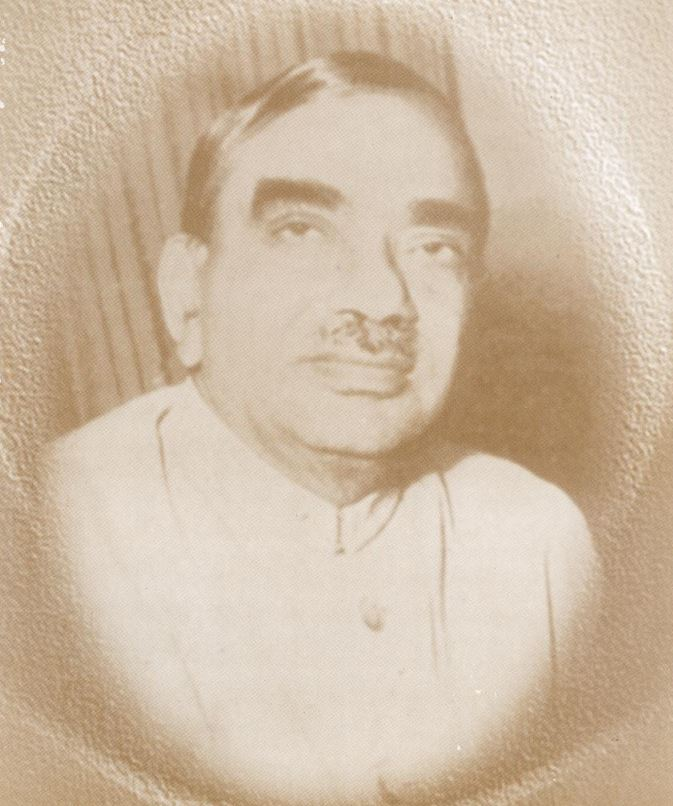

10th Vice-Chancellor of Banaras Hindu University
- In office 16 April 1960 – 15 April 1966
- Appointed by: Rajendra Prasad
- Preceded by: Veni Shankar Jha
- Succeeded by: Triguna Sen

Judge of Supreme Court of India
- In office 8 September 1952 – 6 June 1959
- Nominated by: M. Patanjali Sastri
- Appointed by: Rajendra Prasad

Judge of High Court of Bombay
- In office August 1944 – 7 September 1952
- Appointed by: George VI

Personal details
- Born: 7 August 1894
- Died: 7 January 1970 (aged 75) Ahmedabad, India
- Spouse: Saraswati
- Relations: Padma Desai (daughter-in-law); Pallavi Shroff (granddaughter); Ketki Bhagwati (granddaughter)
- Children: 7, including Jagdish, Prafullachandra and Sanat
- Education: Elphinstone College, Baroda College

Justice Natwarlal Harilal Bhagwati (7 August 1894 – 7 January 1970) was a judge at the Supreme Court of India from 1952 to 1959 and the Vice-Chancellor of Banaras Hindu University from 1960 till 1966. Earlier, he had served as the Vice-Chancellor of the University of Bombay during 1949-51. He is also father to the economist Jagdish Bhagwati as well as P. N. Bhagwati, the 17th Chief Justice of India and Sanat Natwarlal Bhagwati, former president of the Neurological Society of India.

== Education ==
Bhagwati initially studied at the Baroda College. He got his Bachelor of Arts from Elphinstone College with honours in 1914 and was a Senior Daxina Fellow of Bombay University for the period 1914–17.

== Vice-Chancellorship ==
One year into his retirement from the Bench, Bhagwati was made the Vice-Chancellor of the Banaras Hindu University (BHU). Gadbois Jr., a scholar of the Indian Supreme Court's history, suspects this to be for political reasons. Gadbois Jr. notes that Bhagwati had previously been the Vice-Chancellor of the University of Bombay from November 1949 to that of 1951. This was in conjunction with his judgeship at the Bombay High Court. Before that, he had been a Senate member of Bombay University in 1947, a Syndicate member of the university and the Vice-President of the Board of Visitors for Government Law College, Bombay in 1948. Bhagwati was also a professor at the Government Law College in Bombay from 1929 to 1931.

According to a note on the family history on his son Jagdish Bhagwati's home page at Columbia University, Natwarlal Bhagwati was a patron of Indian classical music during his term at BHU where he was instrumental in the award of an honorary doctorate by the university to Omkarnath Thakur. It is also claimed that Justice Bhagwati had played a role in the selection of Jarava Lal Mehta and Jayant Narlikar to be respectively sent to Germany and Cambridge for further studies.

Bhagwati died on 7 January 1970 at his residence in Ahmedabad.
