= C.S. Jha =

Vice-Chancellor in Banaras Hindu University (1991-1993)

18th Vice-Chancellor of Banaras Hindu University
- In office 1 May 1991 – 14 June 1993
- Appointed by: Ramaswamy Venkataraman
- Preceded by: R.P. Rastogi
- Succeeded by: D.N. Mishra

Personal details
- Education: Patna University; Bristol University

C.S. Jha (born 1934) was an Indian engineer, professor, and academic administrator. He served as the 18th Vice-Chancellor of Banaras Hindu University from 1991 to 1993.

== Biography ==
Jha obtained B.Sc. in physics from Patna University, and PhD in Electrical Engineering from Bristol University.

Jha later went on to serve IIT Delhi as an assistant professor in 1962, from where he retired in 1994. In that period C. S. Jha went on to become Dean of Engineering at IIT Delhi(1966–69), Director of IIT Kharagpur(1974–78), education (technical) advisor to the Government of India (1979–84), and Vice Chancellor of Banaras Hindu University (1991–93).

Upon retirement in 1994, Jha was appointed as the chairman of the Recruitment & Assessment Centre of Defence Research and Development Organisation.
