= Panjab Singh =

Chancellor of RLB-CAU, former VC of BHU

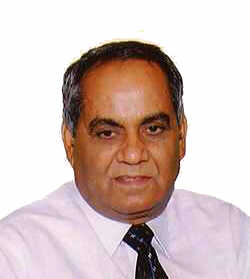

Chancellor of Rani Lakshmi Bai Central Agricultural University
- Incumbent
- Assumed office 2015

23rd Vice-Chancellor of Banaras Hindu University
- In office 3 May 2005 – 7 May 2008
- Appointed by: A. P. J. Abdul Kalam
- Preceded by: Patcha Ramachandra Rao
- Succeeded by: D.P. Singh

Panjab Singh is the first and incumbent chancellor of Rani Lakshmi Bai Central Agricultural University, and the president of Foundation for Advancement of Agriculture and Rural development (FAARD Foundation). He has previously served as the 23rd Vice-Chancellor of Banaras Hindu University (2005-2008), and president National Academy of Agricultural Sciences (2017-2019).

== See also ==
- List of Vice-chancellors of Banaras Hindu University
- Rani Lakshmi Bai Central Agricultural University
