= Ajit Kumar Chaturvedi =

Vice chancellor of Banaras Hindu University

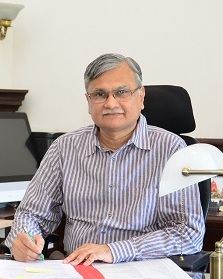

29th Vice-Chancellor of Banaras Hindu University
- Incumbent
- Assumed office 1 August 2025
- Appointed by: President of India
- Preceded by: Sudhir K. Jain

Director (Acting) at Indian Institute of Technology Mandi
- In office 1 July 2020 – 31 January 2022
- Preceded by: Timothy A. Gonsalves
- Succeeded by: Laxmidhar Behera

Director at Indian Institute of Technology Roorkee
- In office 1 January 2017 – 11 Oct 2022
- Preceded by: Pradipta Banerji
- Succeeded by: Prof. Kamal Kishore Pant

Lecturer at Indian Institute of Technology (BHU) Varanasi
- In office 1994–1996

Professor at Indian Institute of Technology Roorkee
- In office 1996–1999

Professor,Dean of Research & Development and Deputy Director at Indian Institute of Technology Kanpur
- In office 1999–2016
- In office 2022–2025

Personal details
- Born: 1964 (age 61–62) (India)
- Education: Indian Institute of Technology Kanpur
- Profession: Professor; Dean; Researcher
- Known for: MIMO systems applications
- Website: Official website

Ajit Kumar Chaturvedi (born 1964) is an Indian Professor, education administrator, currently serving as the 29th Vice-Chancellor of Banaras Hindu University. He has previously served as the Director of IIT Roorkee. He has largely contributed to waveform shaping and sequence design, MIMO systems.

Chaturvedi was appointed as the 29th Vice-Chancellor of Banaras Hindu University in July 2025.

== Awards, honors and fellowships ==
- Tan Chin Tuan Fellowship of Nanyang Technical University, Singapore (2008).
- INSA Teacher award (2017)

== Education ==
- PhD, Electrical Engineering, IIT Kanpur, 1995
- M. Tech., Electrical Engineering, IIT Kanpur, 1988
- B. Tech., Electrical Engineering, IIT Kanpur, 1986

== Selected bibliography ==
=== Articles ===
- Singh, Vindheshwari P.; Chaturvedi, Ajit Kumar (22 June 2017). "Max–min fairness based linear transceiver–relay design for MIMO interference relay channel". IET Communications. 11 (9): 1485–1496. doi:10.1049/iet-com.2017.0034. S2CID 206185133.
- Manglani, G.; Chaturvedi, A.K. (February 2006). "Application of computational geometry to multiuser detection in CDMA". IEEE Transactions on Communications. 54 (2): 204–207. Bibcode:2006ITCom..54..204M. doi:10.1109/TCOMM.2005.863793. S2CID 9792284.
- Chaturvedi, A.K.; Sharma, G. (1999). "A new family of concurrent algorithms for adaptive Volterra and linear filters". IEEE Transactions on Signal Processing. 47 (9): 2547–2551. Bibcode:1999ITSP...47.2547C. doi:10.1109/78.782201.
- S Chandan, P Sandeep, and AK Chaturvedi, "A family of ISI-free polynomial pulses," Communications Letters, IEEE 9 (6), 496-498 (2005)
- P Sandeep, S Chandan, and AK Chaturvedi, "ISI-free pulses with reduced sensitivity to timing errors," Communications Letters, IEEE 9 (4), 292-294 (2005)
- R Appuswamy and AK Chaturvedi, "A new framework for constructing mutually orthogonal complementary sets and ZCZ sequences," Information Theory, IEEE Transactions on 52 (8), 3817-3826 (2006)
- G Manglani and AK Chaturvedi, "Application of computational geometry to multiuser detection in CDMA," Communications, IEEE Transactions on 54 (2), 204-207 (2006)
- RU Mahesh and AK Chaturvedi, "Closed form BER expressions for BPSK OFDM systems with frequency offset," Communications Letters, IEEE 14 (8), 731-733 (2010)

=== Conference proceedings ===
- Sah, Abhay Kumar; Chaturvedi, A. K. (December 2016). "Improved Sparsity Behaviour and Error Localization in Detectors for Large MIMO Systems". 2016 IEEE Globecom Workshops (GC WKSHPS). IEEE. pp. 1–6. doi:10.1109/GLOCOMW.2016.7848930. ISBN 978-1-5090-2482-7. S2CID 25357090.
- Sah, Abhay Kumar; Chaturvedi, A. K. (January 2016). "Improving the reliability of receivers for 5G networks". 2016 8th International Conference on Communication Systems and Networks (COMSNETS). IEEE. pp. 1–2. doi:10.1109/COMSNETS.2016.7439993. ISBN 978-1-4673-9622-6. S2CID 4908364.
