= D. N. Mishra =

19th Vice-Chancellor of BHU

19th Vice-Chancellor of Banaras Hindu University
- In office 8 February 1994 – 27 June 1995
- Appointed by: Shankar Dayal Sharma
- Preceded by: C.S. Jha
- Succeeded by: Hari Gautam

Devendra Nath Mishra was an Indian mathematician and academic administrator. He was the 19th Vice-Chancellor of Banaras Hindu University from February 1994 to June 1995.

Mishra pursued his formal education at the Scindia School, Gwalior. Later he pursued BSc and MSc in Mathematics at the University of Lucknow, followed by a Doctorate (DSc) from the Sorbonne University in Paris.

Mishra taught Mathematics in Lucknow University and founded the Lucknow Film Society. He was also associated with the CSIR and became its Deputy director in the 80s. Mishra was a distinguished Indian mathematician, who went on to head the department of mathematics at Dr. Hari Singh Gour University. In addition, he also taught French as a temporary lecturer at the Department of English and Modern European Languages, University of Lucknow around the late sixties.

Mishra died in 2020.
