= Vijaygarh Jyotish Ray College =

College in Kolkata, India

- Type: Undergraduate college
- Established: 1950; 76 years ago
- Affiliations: University of Calcutta
- Principal: Dr. Rajyasri Neogy
- Location: 8, 2, Bijoygarh, Jadavpur, Kolkata, West Bengal, 700032, India; 22.5695344°N 88.3672145°E
- Campus: Urban
- Website: www.vijaygarhjrcollege.com

- Location within Kolkata Location within India

Vijaygarh Jyotish Roy College is a Govt. aided college in Southern Kolkata, India. It offers science, arts, and commerce courses with undergraduate and post-graduate degrees, and it is affiliated with the University of Calcutta. It is recognized under (UGC) University Grants Commission (India), and accredited with Grade "A" by the National Assessment and Accreditation Council of India (NAAC).This land of College was originally owned by the United States Army and by a private zamindar.

== Foundation ==
The land was originally owned by the United States Army and by a private zamindar. In June 1950, the first colony committee, consisting of Santosh Kumar Dutta, Bhupendra Lal Nag, Prof. Samar Chowdhury, and Prof. Sukumar Chakraborty, set its sights upon the military barrack as the possible site for the college. The college was finally founded in 1950 2 November. The first Governing Body with Prof. Prasanta Kumar Bose at the helm included such illustrious academics as Dr. Triguna Sen, Dhirendranath Ray chowdhury, Nagendranath Pal, Sukumar Gupta, and Dr. Makhanlal Ray Chowdhury.

== Departments ==
=== Science ===
A post graduation course in Microbiology was introduced.

- Physics
- Chemistry
- Mathematics
- Microbiology
- Zoology
- Botany
- Physiology
- Environmental Science
- Computer applications

=== Arts ===
Most Popular graduate courses in Pol. Science, Journalism and Mass Communication.

- Bengali
- English
- Political Science
- History
- Education
- Journalism and Mass Communication
- Philosophy

=== Commerce ===
- Economics

=== Certificate courses ===
- Filmmaking and Television Production
- Newspaper Reporting and Editing
- Employability skill
- Radio Production
- News Reading And Anchoring

=== Master's degree ===
- Microbiology

== Library ==
The Library, as one of the important central facilities of the Institute, supports the study, teaching, research, and development programs of the Institute. It is housed in a separate building with three floors on a plinth area of 1000 sq. meters. The library has a collection of 1.7 lakh volumes of books, which includes Text Books, Reference Books & Bound volumes of Journals, Standards, etc. The Library subscribes to about 120 current Journals. Library operations have been automated with the help of an integrated library software package, LIBSYS-4. The book database is accessible through OPAC (Online Public Access Catalogue). Circulation Services are executed through the Barcode System (Scanning). It has a good collection of Electronic resources in its Digital Library. It is an open-access library and remains open from 8:30 A.M. to 12:00 Midnight on weekdays and from 9:00 A.M. to 5:00 P.M. on weekends. The library has introduced a Wi-Fi Internet facility inside it to facilitate the free flow of information to the users. The library has a well-equipped Xerox facility. The users can avail of this facility on payment of a nominal charge. It also has some Audio-Visual equipment like Colour TVs, VCPs, Video-Camera, Projectors, Multimedia Projectors, etc.

== Radio station ==
This college started a Radio Station named Radio Kolkata, in November, 2021

== College publications ==
- Ecolore, Web magazine, is published annually by Vijaygarh Jyotish Ray College, the Department of Economics. It was first published in 2020.
- Dishari, online and Print Magazine, is published annually by Vijaygarh Jyotish Ray College, the Department of Journalism & Mass Communication. It was first published in 2020

== Notable faculty ==
- Triguna Sen, Department of physics, Union Minister for education in Government of India. He got Padma Bhushan.He was member of governing body and guest lecturer for this College.
- Mahasweta Devi, Department of English,Writer, an activist and Academic. Nominated for Nobel Prize for Literature in 2012, Padma Shri Awarded for Social Work in 1986. She was Assistant Professor of this college.
- Chinmoy Guha, Department of English essayist, translator and Academic, awarded three knighthoods by the Ministry of Education in 2010 and 2013, and one by the Ministry of Culture in 2019.He was Assistant Professor of this college.

== Accreditation ==
Vijaygarh Jyotish Ray College is recognized by the University Grants Commission and accredited by the National Assessment and Accreditation Council of India.

== Status and Initiatives ==
- Science Film-Making Workshop was organised by dept of Journalism and Mass communication, Vijaygarh Jyotish Ray College, on 31 August 2019, in collaboration with Indian Science News Association & Vigyan Prasar, DST, Govt of India.
- Women Entrepreneurship Development Workshop was organized by Journalism & Mass Communication, VJRC on 29/11/2019. Mr. Amio Kalidaha, Scientific Officer, DST, Govt. of W. B., Dr. Prananta Biswas, Professor, Jadavpur University, Mr. Jayanta Das, Secretary, Octavsms were present as resource persons.
- The Principal of VJRC, Dr. Rajyasri Neogy was awarded with Prof. Prasanta Chandra Mahalanobis Memorial Award by The Science Association of Bengal in Collaboration with BITM, NCSM and Govt. of India on National Science Day 2020 on 29 February at BITM, Kolkata
- Public Outreach Programme was organized by the Dept. of Chemistry, Physics & Mathematics, VJRC, on 27.04.2022 in collaboration with Bhabha Atomic Research Centre, Mumbai, Department of Atomic Energy, Government of India.

== See also ==
- List of colleges affiliated to the University of Calcutta
- Education in India
- Education in West Bengal
