= Narendra Deva =

Indian socialist (1889–1956)

Acharya Narendra Deva
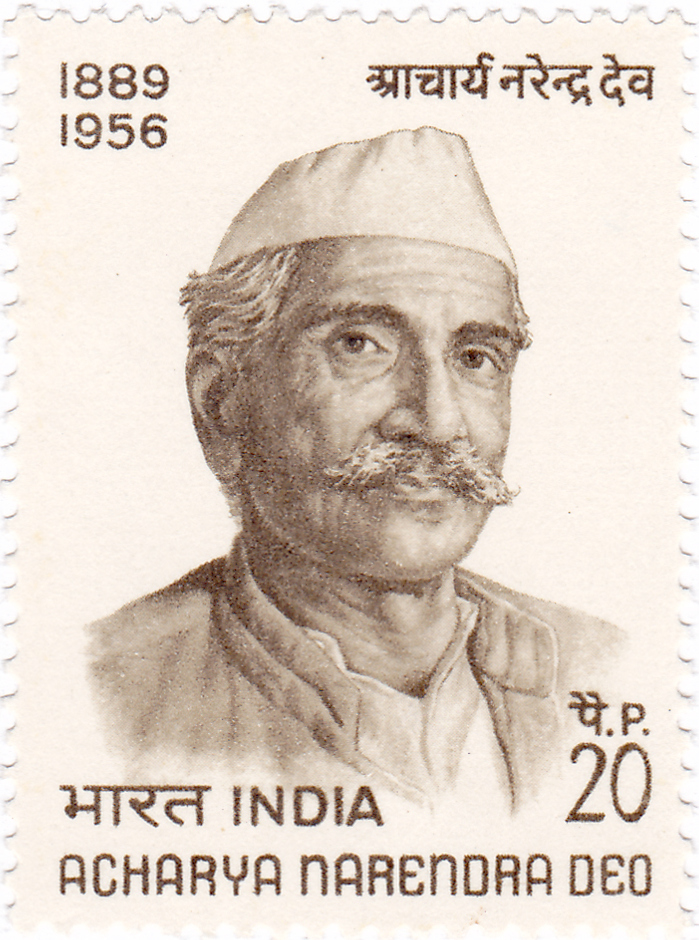
- Narendra Deva on a 1971 stamp of India

Member of Parliament, Rajya Sabha(Congress socialist party
- In office 3 April 1952 – 19 February 1956
- Preceded by: Office established
- Succeeded by: Jogesh Chandra Chatterjee
- Constituency: Uttar Pradesh

7th Vice-Chancellor of Banaras Hindu University
- In office 6 December 1951 – 31 May 1954
- Appointed by: Rajendra Prasad
- Preceded by: Govind Malaviya
- Succeeded by: C. P. Ramaswami Iyer

8th Vice-Chancellor of University of Lucknow
- In office 1947–1951
- Appointed by: Rajendra Prasad
- Preceded by: Visheshwar Dayal Seth
- Succeeded by: Jugal Kishore

Personal details
- Born: 30 October 1889 Sitapur, North-Western Provinces, British India
- Died: 19 February 1956 (aged 66) Erode, Coimbatore district, Madras State, India
- Party: Indian National Congress; Congress Socialist Party; Socialist Party; Praja Socialist Party
- Education: University of Allahabad

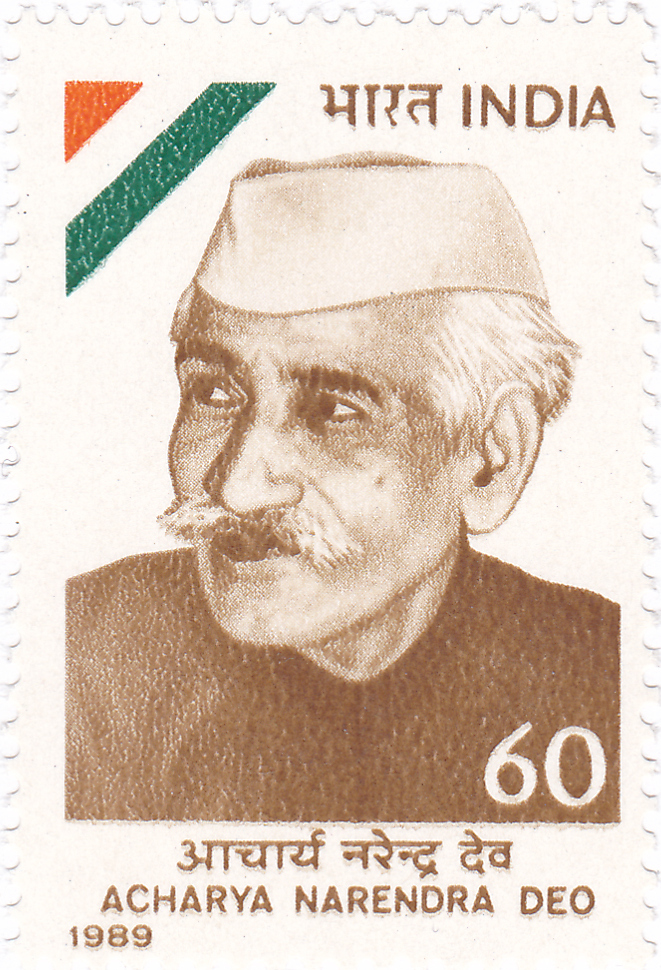
Narendra Deva on a 1989 stamp of India

Acharya Narendra Deva (also Dev; 30 October 1889 – 19 February 1956) was one of the leading theorists of the Congress Socialist Party in India. His democratic socialism renounced violent means as a matter of principle and embraced the satyagraha as a revolutionary tactic.

He was born at Sitapur in U.P. imprisoned several times during the freedom movement

Dev was first drawn to nationalism around 1915 under the influence of B G Tilak and Aurobindo Ghosh. As a teacher he became interested in Marxism and Buddhism. He was active in the Hindi language movement. He was a key leader of the Congress Socialist Party from its founding in 1934 and was imprisoned several times during the freedom struggle. He was at times a member of the Uttar Pradesh legislative assembly. In the electoral politics of Uttar Pradesh, his guide and mentor was Chaubey Mukta Prasad of Lucknow.

He served as the 8th Vice Chancellor of University of Lucknow from 1947-1951 and as Vice Chancellor of Banaras Hindu University from December 1951 to 31 May 1954. Helped by Nirmal Chandra Chaturvedi, Executive Councillor and a prominent educationist of the state, he started a number of projects for the expansion of the university.

Narendra Dev advocated the abolition of poverty and exploitation not just through the Marxist materialist dialectic but especially on moral and humanistic grounds. He insisted that "without social democracy political democracy was a sham". Dev was active in the peasant movement and served as president of the All-India Kisan Congress.

He remained associated with the Socialist Party and its successor, the Praja Socialist Party, until his death in 1956.

== Legacy ==
Prime Minister Rajiv Gandhi said: "Acharya Narendra Dev was one of the greatest sons of India and the nation owes a great debt to him."

The Narendra Dev University of Agriculture and Technology was named in his honour in 1975.

The Acharya Narendra Dev College, University of Delhi, was also named in his honour in 1991.

Acharya Narendra Dev International Hall, one of the oldest Boys Hostels of University of Lucknow, was also named after him.

In an emotional obituary in Rajya Sabha, Jawaharlal Nehru said:

"The death of Acharya Narendra Dev is something much bigger for many of us and, I think, for the country than just the passing away of an important person. He was a man of rare distinction—distinction in many fields—rare in spirit, rare in mind and intellect, rare in integrity of mind and otherwise. Only his body failed him. I do not know if there is any person present here in this House who was associated with him for a longer period than I was. Over 40 years ago we came together and we shared innumerable experiences together in the dust and heat of the struggle for independence and in the long silence of prison life where we spent—I forget now—four or five years together at various places, and inevitably got to know each other intimately; and so, for many of us, it is a grievous loss and a grievous blow, even as it is a grievous loss for our country. There is the public sense of loss and there is the private sense of loss and a feeling that somebody of rare distinction has gone and it will be very difficult to find his like again."

He was also the first Principal of Lucknow Montessori Inter College and a professor at Kashi Vidyapeeth. He died at the age of 67 in 19 February 1956 in Erode, Madras State.
