= Banaras Hindu University Act, 1915 =

Act of Indian Parliament

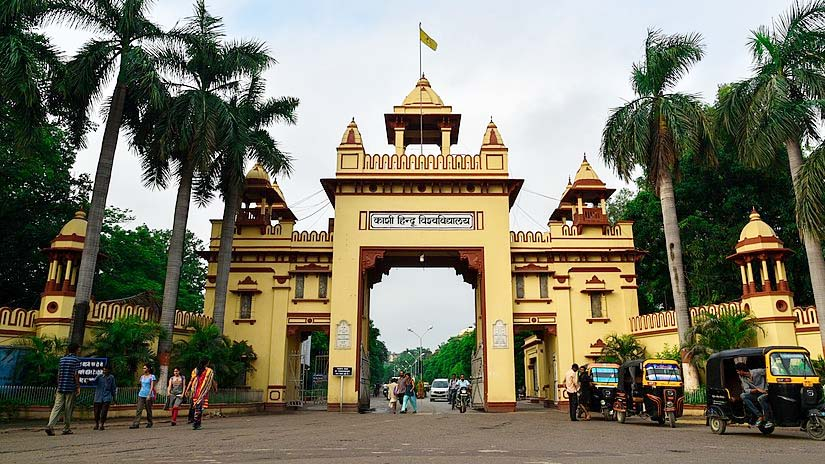
- The university main entrance gate

Imperial Legislative Council
- Long title: An Act to establish and incorporate a teaching and residential Hindu University at Banaras
- Citation: Banaras Hindu University Act (Act 16). 1915.
- Territorial extent: India
- Passed by: Imperial Legislative Council
- Passed: 1 October 1915
- Signed by: Viceroy and Governor-General of India
- Signed: 1 October 1915
- Commenced: 1 April 1916

Legislative history
- Introduced by: Harcourt Butler
- Introduced: 11 March 1915

Amended by
- Benares Hindu University (Amendment) Act, 1930; Benares Hindu University (Amendment) Act 1951; Banaras Hindu University (Amendment) Act, 1958; Banaras Hindu University (Amendment) Act, 1966; Banaras Hindu University (Amendment) Act, 1969; Delegated Legislation Provisions (Amendment) Act, 2004; Central Universities Laws (Amendment) Act, 2008

Summary
- An act to establish and incorporate a teaching and residential, Hindu university at Banaras.
- Status: In force

The Banaras Hindu University Act, 1915 (also called the BHU Act), is an act of Imperial Legislative Council, passed on 1 October 1915 and assented by the then-Viceroy Charles Hardinge on the same day to establish Banaras Hindu University. It was the act number 16 of 1915, and came into force from 1 April 1916 on being published in the Gazette of India on 23 March 1916.

The act has been amended six times thus far, in 1922, 1930, 1951, 1958, 1966, and 1969.

== History ==
In 1905 at the twenty first conference of Indian National Congress in Banaras Pandit Madan Mohan Malaviya announced his goal of establishing a university in Banaras. Mahamana Malviya established a Hindu University Society, with Maharaja of Darbhanga Rameshwar Singh Bahadur as the president to crowd-source the funding from all over Indian subcontinent for the establishment of such university.

The first draft was prepared in October 1911.

On 22 March 1915, then Education Minister Harcourt Butler introduced the Benares Hindu University Bill. In his speech he remarked about the university:

My Lord, this is no ordinary occasion. We are watching to-day the birth of a new and, many hope, a better type of University in India. The main features of this University, which distinguish it from existing Universities, will be, first. that it will be a teaching and residential University; secondly, that while it will be open to all castes and creeds, it will insist upon religious instructions for Hindus, and thirdly, that it will be conducted and managed by the Hindu community and almost entirely by non-officials

— Harcourt Butler 11 March 1915, Imperial Legislative Council, New Delhi, India

The bill was passed on 1 October 1915.

== The Act ==
- The Banaras Hindu University Act, 1915, as modified upto December 2018
- The Benares Hindu University Act, as passed in 1915

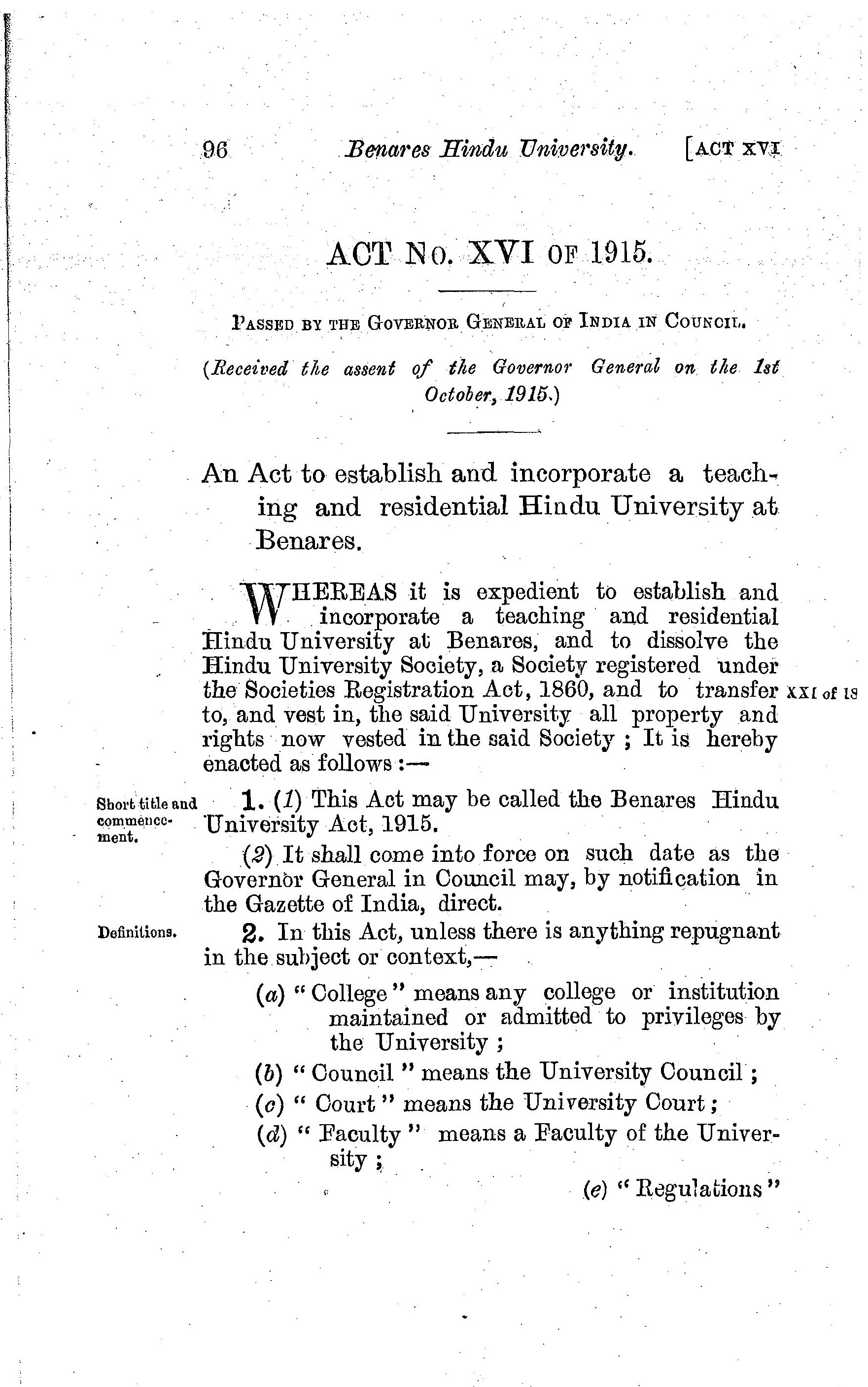
First page of then Benares Hindu University Act, as passed in 1915

== Statutes ==
The Statutes in force at the commencement of the university were added into the BHU act as a schedule vide an amendment in 1966. The statutes of the university are published on the official website, and are not usually added to the Act document.
