= Madan Mohan Malaviya =

Indian independence activist, scholar, educator, politician (1861–1946)

Pandit Madan Mohan Malaviya
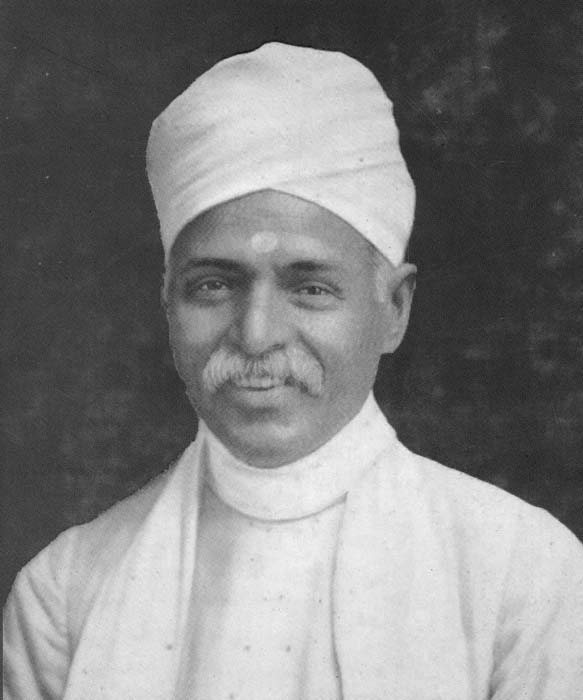

3rd Vice-Chancellor of Banaras Hindu University
- In office 29 November 1919 – 20 August 1939
- Preceded by: P. S. Sivaswami Iyer
- Succeeded by: Sarvepalli Radhakrishnan

President of the Indian National Congress
- In office 1909–1910
- Preceded by: Rash Behari Ghosh
- Succeeded by: William Wedderburn
- In office 1918
- Preceded by: Annie Besant
- Succeeded by: Syed Hasan Imam
- In office 1932–1933
- Preceded by: Vallabhbhai Patel
- Succeeded by: Nellie Sengupta

Personal details
- Born: 25 December 1861 Allahabad, North-Western Provinces, British India (present-day Prayagraj, Uttar Pradesh, India)
- Died: 12 November 1946 (aged 84) Allahabad, United Provinces, British India (present-day Prayagraj, Uttar Pradesh, India)
- Party: Congress Nationalist Party; Akhil Bharatiya Hindu Mahasabha
- Other political affiliations: Indian National Congress (formerly)
- Spouse: Kumari Kundan Devi Malaviya
- Children: 6 (including Govind Malaviya)
- Education: University of Calcutta (BA)
- Profession: Educationist; Politician; Journalist; Lawyer
- Awards: Bharat Ratna (2015) (posthumous)
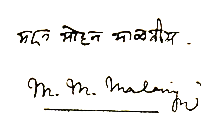
- Signature

Madan Mohan Malaviya (25 December 1861 — 12 November 1946; Hindi pronunciation: [məd̪ən̪ moːɦən̪ maːlʋiːj(ə)]) was an Indian scholar, educational reformer, and activist notable for his role in the Indian independence movement. He was president of the Indian National Congress four times and the founder of Akhil Bharat Hindu Mahasabha. He was addressed as Pandit, a title of respect. Malaviya is known as the founder of one of the most prestigious universities of India named Banaras Hindu University.

Malaviya strove to promote modern education among Indians and founded the Banaras Hindu University (BHU) at Varanasi in 1916, which was created under the 1915 BHU Act. It is the largest residential university in Asia and one of the largest in the world, with over 40,000 students across arts, commerce, sciences, engineering, linguistic, ritual, medicine, agriculture, performing arts, law, management, and technology disciplines from all over the world. He was the Vice Chancellor of the Banaras Hindu University from 1919 to 1938.

Malaviya was one of the founders of the Bharat Scouts and Guides. He founded a highly influential English newspaper, The Leader, in 1919, published from Allahabad. He was also the chairman of Hindustan Times from 1924 to 1946. His efforts resulted in the launch of its Hindi edition named Hindustan Dainik in 1936.

Malaviya was posthumously awarded the Bharat Ratna, India's highest civilian distinction, on 24 December 2014, a day before what would have been his 153rd birthday.

== Early life and education ==
Malaviya was born in Allahabad, India, on 25 December 1861, in a Gaur Brahmin family to Brijnath Malaviya and Moona Devi. He was born in a locality known as Lal Diggi (now Malviya Nagar) in a small house of Sawal Das of Saryakund. His grandfather, Premdhar Prasad, was the son of Vishnu Prasad. Since they hailed from Malwa (Ujjain) in the present-day state of Madhya Pradesh, they came to be known as 'Malaviya'. He married Kundan Devi from Mirzapur at sixteen. His ancestors were highly respected for their learning and knowledge of Hindu scriptures and Sanskrit scholarship. His father also was learned in Sanskrit scriptures and used to recite the Srimad Bhagavatam.

Malaviya's education began at the age of five in Mahajani Pathsala. Later, he joined Hardeva's Dharma Gyanopadesh Pathshala, completed his primary education and joined a school run by Vidha Vardini Sabha. He then joined Allahabad Zila School (Allahabad District School), where he started writing poems under the pen name Makarand which were published in journals and magazines.

Malaviya matriculated in 1879 from the Muir Central College, now known as the University of Allahabad. Harrison College's principal provided a monthly scholarship to Malaviya, whose family had been facing financial hardships, and he was able to complete his B.A. at the University of Calcutta.

Malaviya desired to pursue an M.A. in Sanskrit. Still, family circumstances did not allow him to do so, and his father wanted him to pursue the family profession of Bhagavat recital instead. In July 1884, Madan Mohan Malaviya began his professional career as an assistant master at the Government High School in Allahabad.

== Political career ==
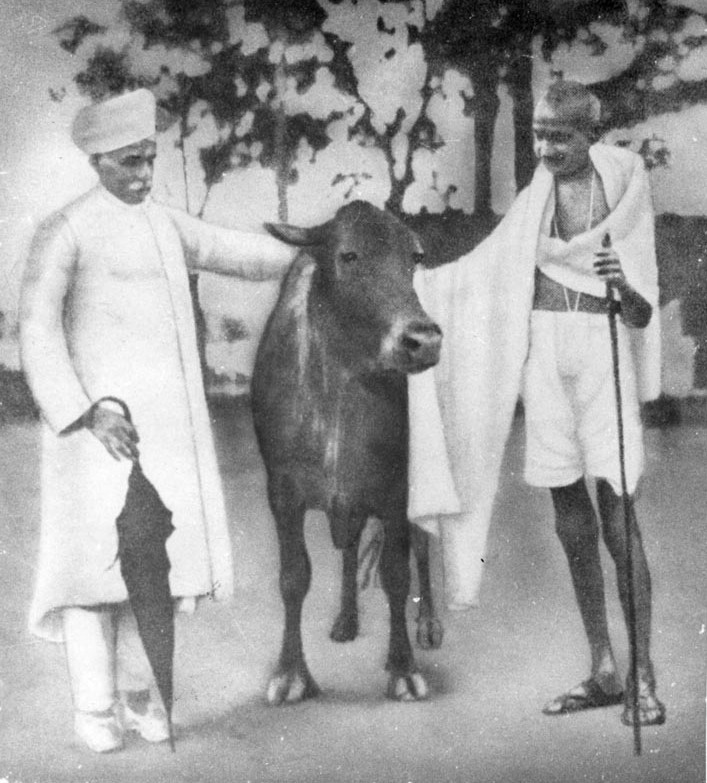
Malaviya with Mahatma Gandhi.

Malaviya started his political career in 1886 with an address to the Indian National Congress session in Calcutta. Malaviya would go on to become one of the most powerful political leaders of his time, being elected Congress president on four occasions.

In December 1886, Malaviya attended the second Indian National Congress session in Calcutta under the chairmanship of Dadabhai Naoroji, where he spoke on the issue of representation in Councils. His address not only impressed Dadabhai but also Raja Rampal Singh, ruler of Kalakankar estate near Allahabad, who had founded a Hindi weekly, Hindustan, but was still looking for a suitable editor to turn it into a daily. In July 1887, Malaviya resigned from the school and joined as editor of the nationalist weekly. He remained there for two and a half years, and then left for Allahabad to study for his L.L.B. In Allahabad, he was offered the co-editorship of The Indian Opinion, an English daily. After finishing his law degree, he started practicing law at Allahabad District Court in 1891, and moved to Allahabad High Court by December 1893.

Malaviya became the president of the Indian National Congress in 1909, a position he held again in 1918. He was a moderate leader and opposed separate electorates for Muslims under the Lucknow Pact of 1916. The "Mahamana" title was conferred on him by Mahatma Gandhi.

Malaviya renounced his practice of law in 1911 to fulfil his resolve to serve the causes of education and social service. Despite this vow, on one occasion when 177 freedom fighters were convicted to be hanged in the Chauri-Chaura case, he appeared before the court and won the acquittal of 156 freedom fighters. He followed the tradition of Sannyasa throughout his life, adhering to his avowed commitment to live on the support of society.

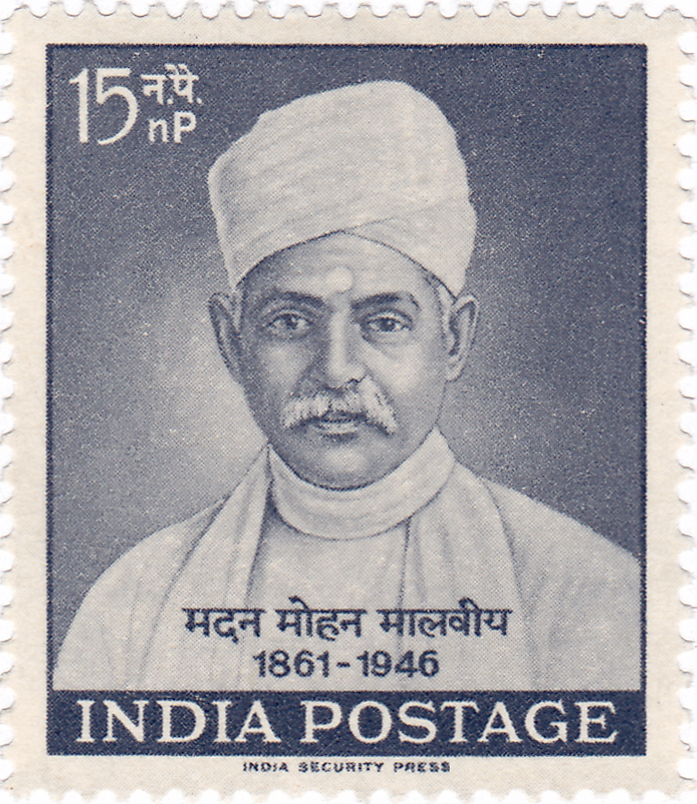
A commemorative postage stamp on MADAN MOHAN MALAVIYA (1861–1946) issued by Department of Posts, Government of India on 25 Dec 1961.

He was a member of the Imperial Legislative Council from 1912 until 1919, when it was converted to the Central Legislative Assembly, of which he remained a member until 1926. Malaviya was an important figure in the Non-cooperation movement. He was opposed to the politics of appeasement and the participation of Congress in the Khilafat movement.

In 1928, he joined Lala Lajpat Rai, Jawaharlal Nehru, and many others in protesting against the Simon Commission, which had been set up by the British to consider India's future. Just as the "Buy British" campaign was sweeping England, he issued a manifesto on 30 May 1932 urging concentration on the "Buy Indian" movement in India. Malaviya was a delegate at the Second Round Table Conference in 1931.

During the Salt March, he was arrested on 25 April 1932 along with 450 other Congress volunteers in Delhi, only a few days after he was appointed as the president of Congress following the arrest of Sarojini Naidu. In 1933, at Calcutta, Malaviya was again appointed as the president of the Congress. Before independence, Malaviya was the only leader of the Indian National Congress to be appointed as its president for four terms.

On 24 September 1932, an agreement known as Poona Pact was signed between Dr. B R Ambedkar (on behalf of the depressed classes among Hindus) and Mahatma Gandhi (on behalf of the other Hindus). The agreement guaranteed reserved seats for the depressed classes in the provisional legislatures within the general electorate, and not by creating a separate electorate. Because of the pact, the depressed class received 148 seats in the legislature, instead of the 71 as allocated in the Communal Award proposal of the British prime minister Ramsay MacDonald. After the pact, the Communal Award was modified to include the terms as per the pacts. The text uses the term "Depressed Classes" to denote Untouchables among Hindus who were later called Scheduled Castes and Scheduled Tribes under India Act 1935, and in the Indian Constitution of 1950.

In protest against the Communal Award to provide separate electorates for minorities, Malaviya and Madhav Shrihari Aney left the Congress and started the Congress Nationalist Party. The party contested the 1934 elections to the central legislature and won 12 seats.

== Journalistic career ==
Malaviya started his journalistic career as editor of the Hindi daily Hindustan in 1887. Raja Rampal Singh of Kalakankar (Pratapgadh District), impressed by the speech and personality of Malaviya during the second Congress Session in Calcutta held in 1886, requested him to assume this position.

In 1889, he became the editor of the "Indian Opinion". After the incorporation of "Indian Opinion" with the "Advocate" of Lucknow, Malaviya started his own Hindi weekly "Abhyudaya"(1907–1909 under his editorship).

Malaviya's poems (sawaiyas) were published sometime in 1883–84 under the pseudonym of 'Makrand' in Harischandra Chandrika magazine (published by Bharatendu Harishchandra). His articles on religious and contemporary subjects were published in 'Hindi Pradeepa'.

When the British government promulgated The Newspaper (Incitement to Offences) Act in 1908 and the Indian Press Act, 1910, Malaviya started a campaign against them and called for an All India Conference in Allahabad. He then realised the need of an English newspaper to make the campaign effective throughout the country. As a result, with the help of Motilal Nehru, he started an English daily, the Leader, in 1909, where he was Editor (1909–1911) and President (1911–1919).

In 1910, Malaviya started the Hindi paper Maryada.

In 1924, Malaviya along with the help of national leaders Lala Lajpat Rai, M. R. Jayakar and industrialist Ghanshyam Das Birla, acquired The Hindustan Times and saved it from an untimely demise. Malaviya raised Rs. 50,000 for the acquisition, with Birla paying most of it. Malaviya was the chairman of Hindustan Times from 1924 to 1946. His efforts resulted in the launch of its Hindi edition 'Hindustan' in 1936. The paper is now owned by the Birla family.

In 1933, Malaviya started Sanatana Dharma from BHU, a magazine dedicated to religious, dharmic interests.

== Legal career ==
In 1891, Malaviya completed his LL.B. from Allahabad University and started practice in Allahabad District Court. He practised at the High Court from 1893. He earned significant respect as one of the most brilliant lawyers of the Allahabad High Court. He gave up his legal practice when at his pinnacle in 1911 on his 50th birthday so that he could serve the nation thereafter.

Regarding his legal career, Sir Tej Bahadur Sapru regarded him as "a brilliant Civil Lawyer," and Sir Mirza Ismail said, "I have heard a great lawyer say that if Mr. Malaviya had so willed it, he would have been an ornament to the legal profession."

Malaviya only donned his lawyer's robe once more, in 1924 following the Chauri Chaura incident in which a police station was attacked and set on fire in February 1922, as a result of which Mahatma Gandhi called off the then launched Non-cooperation movement. The sessions court had sentenced 170 persons to the gallows for the attack. However, Malaviya defended them in the Allahabad High Court and was able to save 155 of them. The remaining 15 also were recommended for clemency by the High Court, whereafter their sentences were commuted from death to life imprisonment.

== Banaras Hindu University ==
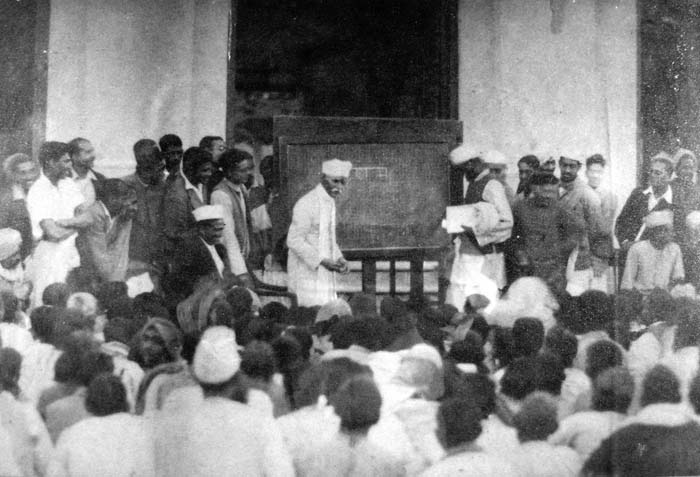
Mahamana inaugurate literacy day at Banaras Hindu University

In April 1911, Annie Besant met Malaviya and they decided to work for a common Hindu University in Varanasi. Besant and fellow trustees of the Central Hindu College, which she had founded in 1898, also agreed to the Government of India's precondition that the college become a part of the new university. Thus Banaras Hindu University (BHU) was established in 1916, through a parliamentary legislation, the 'Banaras Hindu University Act of 1915', and today it remains a prominent institution of learning in India. In 1939, he left the vice-chancellorship of BHU and was succeeded by S. Radhakrishnan, who later became the president of India.

Spread over 16.5 km^{2} (4,100 acres) with a student population of about 30,000, BHU is the largest residential university in Asia.

Malaviya' son Pandit Govind Malaviya served as the vice-chancellor of BHU from 1948 to 1951. His grandson Justice Giridhar Malaviya was the chancellor of BHU from 2018 to 2024, till his demise.

== Social service ==
Malaviya founded Ganga Mahasabha to oppose the damming of the Ganga. He compelled the British government to sign an agreement with Ganga Mahasabha and other Hindu religious leaders on uninterrupted flow of the Ganga in Haridwar and protection from any future obstruction. This agreement is known as Aviral Ganga Raksha Samjhuata 1916 or the Agreement of 1916. Malaviya played an important part in the removal of untouchability and in giving direction to the Harijan movement. The Harijan Sevak Sangh was founded at a meeting in 1933 at which Pandit Malaviya presided.

Malaviya asserted – if you admit internal purity of human soul, you or your religion can never get impure or defiled in any way by touch or association with any man.

To solve the problem of untouchability, Malaviya followed a Hindu method, of giving Mantradīkshā to untouchables. He said, "Mantras would be a certain means of their upliftment socially, politically and spiritually." He worked for the eradication of caste barriers in temples and other social barriers. Malaviya contributed significantly to ensuring the entry of the so-called untouchables into any Hindu temple. In March 1936, Hindu Dalit (Harijan) leader P. N. Rajbhoj along with a group of 200 Dalit people demanded entry at the Kalaram Temple on a Rath Yatra day. Malaviya in the presence of priests of Kalaram Temple, gave diksha to the assembled people and facilitated their entry into the temple. They then also participated in the Rath Yatra of Kalaram Temple.

He established Bharati Bhawan Library on 15 December 1889 with his friend Lala Brajmohan Jee Bhalla in Allahabad. In 1901 Malaviya established a boys' hostel named Hindu Hostel (Hindu Boarding House) in Allahabad.

== Scouting ==
Scouting in India was initially introduced by Robert Baden Powell, though only British, European and Anglo Indian students could join the organisation known as British Boy Scouts. Scouting for native Indians was started by Justice Vivian Bose, after independence in 1947. Officials from Hindustan Scouts and Guides were hired by the Government of India when the country became independent to continue the functioning of British Boy Scouts, renamed as the Bharat Scouts and Guides.

Newspaper reports of the resignation of Indian Railways officer Sri Ram Vajpei on grounds of racial discrimination despite being qualified in scouting with its highest degree LT, in England prompted the then president of Congress Malaviya to inform himself about the scouting movement. With the support of other members, Hridayanath Kunzru, Girija Shankar Bajpai, Annie Besant and George Arundale, Malaviya started an organisation called the All India Sewa Samiti under Sewa Bharti unit to conduct scouting activities. While the British refused initially to recognise the scouting education imparted by the Samiti, Baden Powell himself advocated the recognition of Indian Scouting as co-curricular education in school, after a visit to India afforded him the opportunity to learn of the association's activities.

Thanks to Malaviya's efforts, scouting units from across the sub-continent came together to create the Hindustan Scouts Association. Later, the Guides association in India managed by Dr Besant also joined to form the Hindustan Scouts and Guides Association.

Malaviya also notably contributed the MAMOMA short code secret language in scouting, now widely used across the world. The name "MAMOMA" is derived from the initials of his name.

== Legacy ==
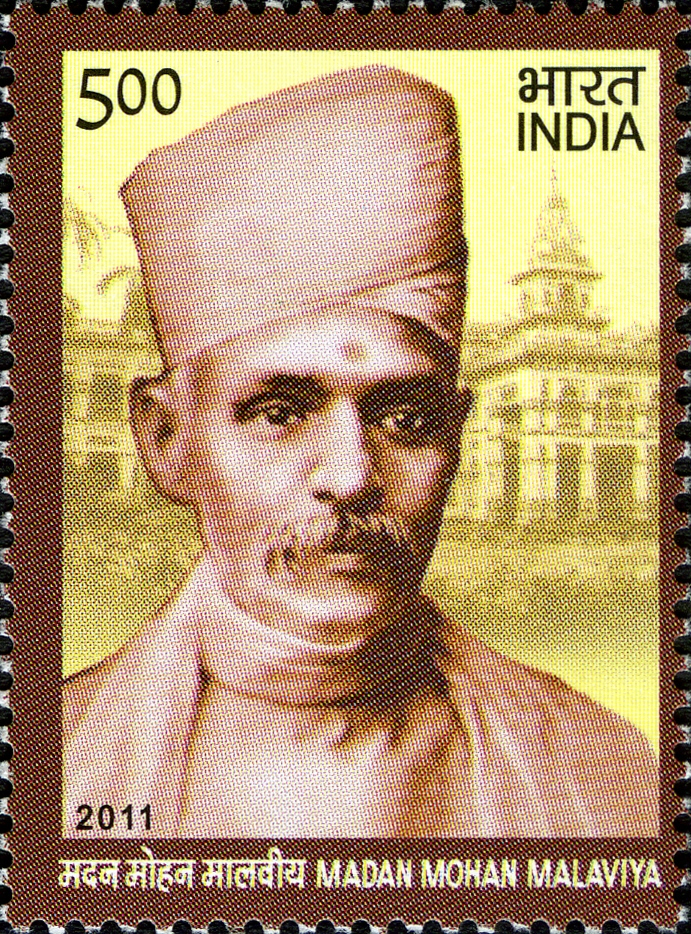
Malaviya on a 2011 stamp of India

The slogan "Satyameva Jayate" (Truth alone triumphs) is also a legacy of Malaviya. Presiding over the Indian National Congress session of 1918 at Delhi, he declared that this phrase from the Mundaka Upanishad should be the slogan for the nation.

Malaviya started the tradition of Aarti at Har ki Pauri Haridwar to the sacred Ganga river which is performed even today. The Malaviya Dwipa, a small island across the ghat, is named after him and a bust of his was erected on it. The Indian Post issued stamps in his honour in 1961 and 2011 to celebrate his 100th and 150th birth anniversaries, respectively.

The Malaviya Nagar neighbourhoods in Allahabad, Lucknow, Delhi, Dehradun, Bhopal, Durg and Jaipur are named after him, as is a square in Jabalpur city, Malaviya Chowk. Malaviya National Institute of Technology (MNIT) at Jaipur is named after him, as is Madan Mohan Malaviya University of Technology in Gorakhpur, UP. The Hostels of IIT Kharagpur, IIT Roorkee Saharanpur Campus and BITS Pilani, Pilani and Hyderabad campuses are also named Malaviya Bhawan after him. In memory of him, Shrigoud Vidya Mandir, Indore celebrates his birth anniversary as Mahamana Divas on every 25 December. They have also declared a fellowship programme for poor Sanatan Vipra boys on this day.

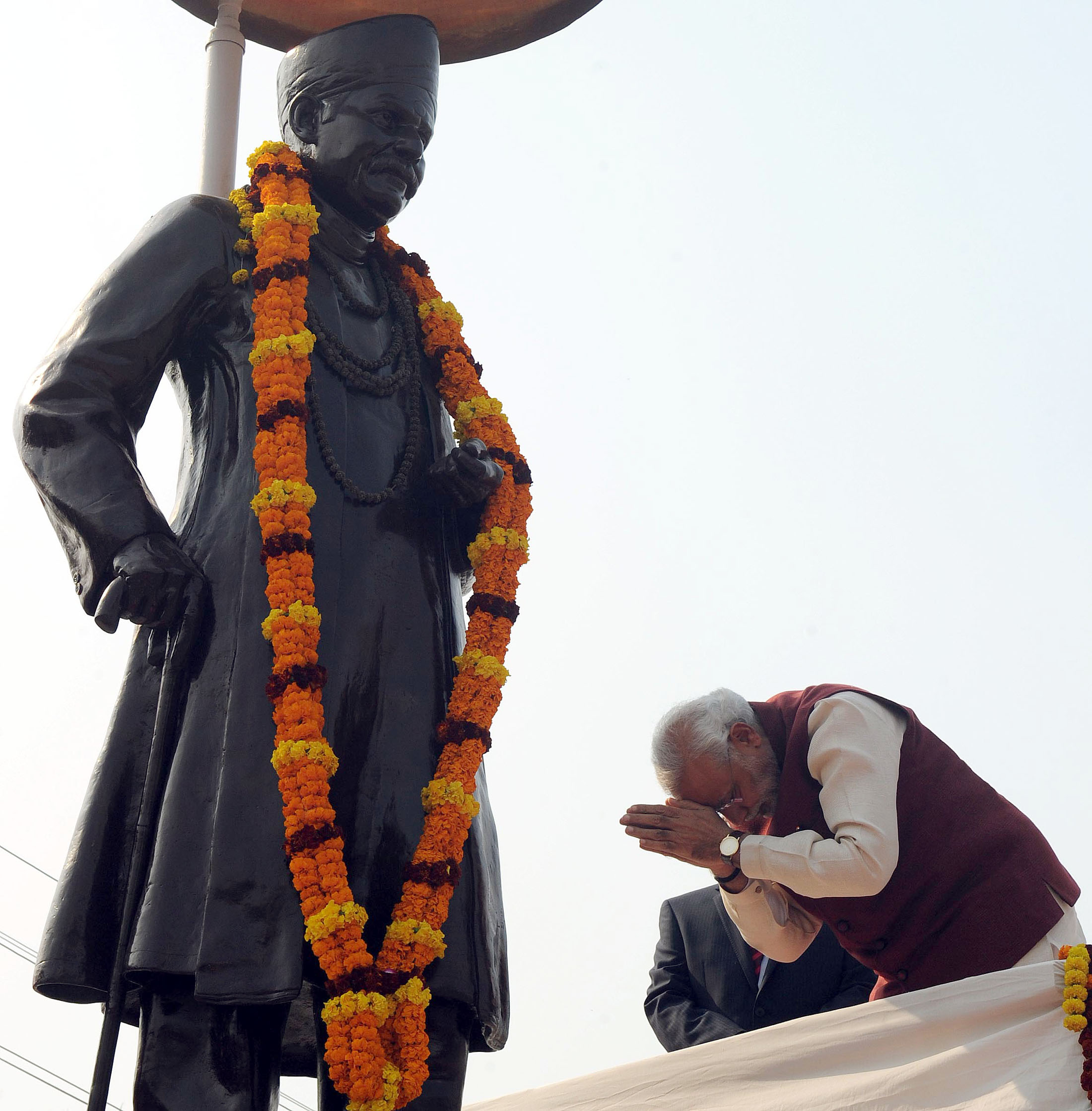
Narendra Modi pays tribute to Madan Mohan Malaviya, on his birth anniversary in 2014

Malaviya's life size portrait was unveiled in the Central Hall of India's Parliament by the then president of India Dr. Rajendra Prasad, and a life-size statue was unveiled in 1961 by the then president of India Dr. S. Radhakrishnan in front of the BHU main gate on the occasion of his birth centenary. A bust of Malaviya was inaugurated in front of the main gate leading to the Assembly Hall and outside the porch, by the former Lt. governor of Delhi, Dr. A.N. Jha, on 25 December 1971.

He is also remembered for his role in ending the Indian indenture system, especially in the Caribbean. His efforts in helping the Indo-Caribbeans is compared to Mahatma Gandhi's efforts of helping Indian South Africans.

On 25 December 2008, on his birth anniversary, the national memorial of Mahamana Madan Mohan Malaviya, "Malaviya Smriti Bhawan" was inaugurated by the then president of India A P J Abdul Kalam at 53, Deen Dayal Upadhyaya Marg, in Delhi.

2011 was celebrated as his 150th birth centenary by the Government of India under the Chairmanship of India's prime minister Dr Manmohan Singh, who announced the establishment of a Centre for Malaviya Studies at the Banaras Hindu University in addition to scholarships and education related awards in his memory, and UPA chairperson Sonia Gandhi released a biography of Madan Mohan Malaviya.

On 24 December 2014, Madan Mohan Malaviya was honored with Bharat Ratna, India's highest civilian honour.

The Mahamana Express train (plying between New Delhi and Varanasi) was flagged off by Prime Minister of India Narendra Modi on 22 January 2016. The train is named after Malaviya and is equipped with modern facilities such as bio-toilets in every coach and air-conditioned compartments.

== Works ==
- He created a non-governmental organisation named Shri Mathura Vrindavan Hasanand Gochar Bhoomi in Vrindavan for Welfare of Cows.
- A criticism of Montagu-Chelmsford proposals of Indian constitutional reform. Printed by C. Y. Chintamani, 1918.
- Speeches and writings of Pandit Madan Mohan Malaviya. Publisher G.A. Natesan, 1919.

== Biographies ==
- Malaviyaji, a brief life sketch of Pandit Madan Mohan Malaviya, by B. J. Akkad. Pub. Vora, 1948.
- Malaviyana: a bibliography of Pandit Madan Mohan Malaviya by Sayaji Rao Gaekwad Library. Ed. Prithvi Nath Kaula. 1962.
- Role of Pt. Madan Mohan Malaviya in our national life, by Chandra Prakash Jha. Modern Publications, 1977.
- Pandit Madan Mohan Malaviya: a socio-political study, by Sundar Lal Gupta. Pub. Chugh Publications, 1978.
- Mahāmanā Madan Mohan Malaviya: An Historical Biography, by Parmanand. Malaviya Adhyayan Sansthan, Banaras Hindu University, 1985.
- Struggle for Independence: Madan Mohan Malaviya by Shri Ram Bakshi. Anmol Publications, 1989. ISBN 81-7041-142-4.
- Madan Mohan Malaviya: the man and his ideology, by S. R. Bakshi. Anmol Publications, 1991. ISBN 81-7041-429-6.
- Madan Mohan Malaviya, by Sitaram Chaturvedi. Publ. Division, Ministry of I & B, Govt. of India, 1996. ISBN 81-230-0486-9.
- Visionary of Modern India- Madan Mohan Malaviya, by S K Maini, K Chandramouli and Vishwanath Pandey. Mahamana MalaviyaJi Trust. 2009.
- "The Making of Malaviya " by Prof Rakesh Pandey, 2010, Kishore Vidya Niketan,ISBN 81-86101-61-6
- "Mahamana Madan Mohan Malaviya" Commemorative Volume (Celebrating 150th Birth Anniversary), Ministry of Culture, Govt. of India, Editor- Dr. Vishwanath Pandey (BHU), 2012, available from the Publication Cell, Banaras Hindu University, Varanasi-221005, India.
- "Vyaktitva, Krititwa Evam Vichar-Mahamana Madan Mohan Malaviya", Editor- Dr. Vishwanath Pandey (BHU), 2011, available from the Publication Cell, Banaras Hindu University, Varanasi-221005, India.
- "Mahamana Pt. Madan Mohan Malaviya" The Noble Edifice of Indian Freedom, Editor-Dr. Vishwanath Pandey (BHU) 2013, available from the Publication Cell, Banaras Hindu University, Varanasi-221005, India.
- "Pandit Madan Mohan Malaviya" and the Formative Years of Indian Nationalism by Dr. Vishwanath Pandey foreword by Prof. Mushirul Hasan, 2015, published by LG Publishers Distributors, Delhi-110091.
- "Madan Mohan Malaviya and the Indian Freedom Movement" by Prof. Jagannath Prasad Misra, 2016, Oxford University Press, India.
