= 2023 IIT-BHU gang rape =

2023 gang rape case in Uttar Pradesh, India

- 2023 IIT-BHU gang rape (Uttar Pradesh)
- Location: 25.31°N 82.97°E; Varanasi, Uttar Pradesh, India
- Date: 1 November 2023
- Attack type: Rape, strangling (with dupatta)
- No. of participants: 3
- Charges: National Security Act and the UP Gangsters and Anti-Social Activities (prevention) act

On 1 November 2023, a 22-year-old B.Tech student of IIT-BHU was waylaid, stripped and gang-raped and filmed on gunpoint by 3 members of the Bharatiya Janata Party Youth Wing in Varanasi district, Uttar Pradesh, India.

== Background ==
On 2 November 2023, an explicit video surfaced online showing a student being accosted by three people in the early hours of the morning inside the Indian Institute of Technology (BHU) campus.

The three accused had travelled to Madhya Pradesh after raping the student on the night of 1 November 2023. According to media reports, when BHU students started protesting after the incident, the suspects felt scared and escaped to Madhya Pradesh and participated in the local campaigning for state elections. Meanwhile, they kept changing locations. They also visited many other cities including Lucknow. Almost two months had passed, and no action had been taken, and all three were now convinced that nothing would happen. After that they returned to Varanasi, police said one of their numbers was monitored and tracked them.

== Protest ==
Congress leaders staged a sit-in protest against the Uttar Pradesh government in the wake of the alleged rape of a student at the prestigious Indian Institute of Technology Varanasi (IIT-BHU). The protesters demanded that justice be done to the student and that the accused be punished. There were also clashes between the Congressmen and the police during the protest. UP Congress president Ajay Rai said that a protest would be held against the rape at the IIT Varanasi.

The Congress and Samajwadi Party have declared their intention to initiate a statewide protest movement regarding this matter. They have expressed their concerns over the silence of both the Prime Minister Narendra Modi and Uttar Pradesh Chief Minister Yogi Adityanath on this issue.

Amitabh Thakur, the national president of Azad Adhikar Sena, called for action to be taken against the leaders who shielded the accused. Additionally, prayers were conducted to seek purification for the souls of BJP leaders in Lucknow.

== Aftermath and Arrests ==
All three accused had fled to Madhya Pradesh after raping the 22-year-old girl on 1 November 2023. In Madhya Pradesh they campaigned for the Bharatiya Janata Party. According to media reports, Uttar Pradesh police tracked down the three suspects within three days but could not arrest them allegedly due to orders from higher authorities. Later, when elections were held in four states, police intervened, and the three suspects were arrested. After the arrest, all three defendants were detained for 12 days. After their arrest, pictures of the accused with key leaders of the Bharatiya Janata Party went viral on the social media.

== Accused bail ==
The fast-track court in Varanasi had earlier rejected the bail petitions of all three accused. High Court has granted bail to two of the accused. The High Court had accepted the bail petitions of Kunal Pandey and Abhishek Chauhan on 4 and 2 July. The third accused, Saksham Patel was granted bail on 13 November 2024 on the basis of clear past records.
