= Sudhir K. Jain =

28th Vice-chancellor of BHU

Dr. Sudhir Kumar Jain Padma Shri
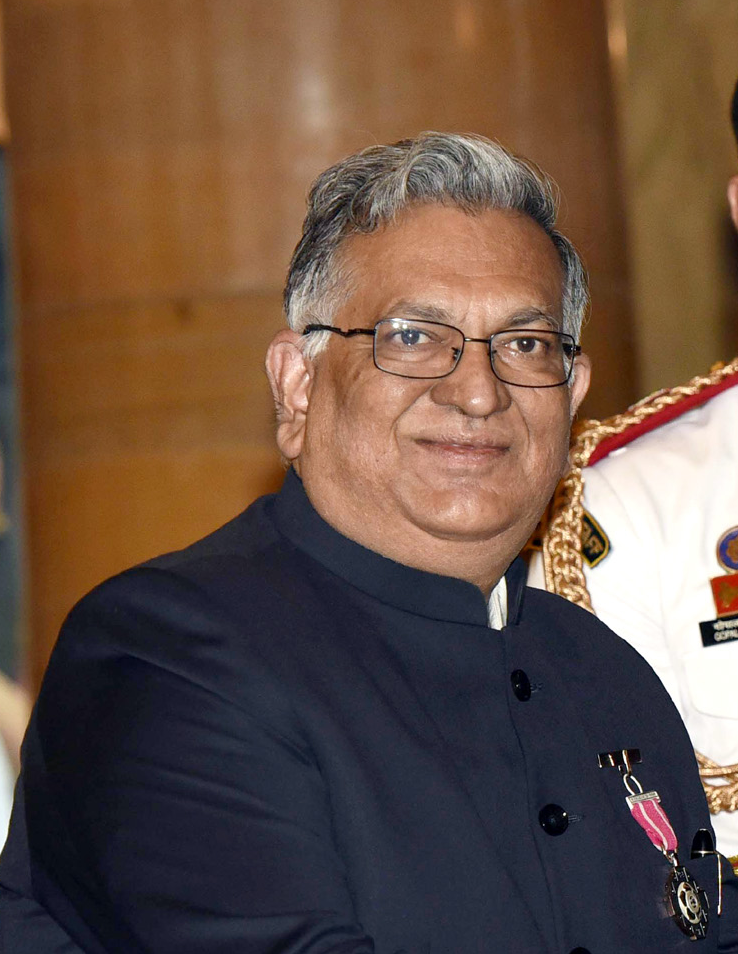
- Jain in 2021

28th Vice-Chancellor of Banaras Hindu University
- In office 7 January 2022 – 7 January 2025
- Appointed by: Ram Nath Kovind
- Preceded by: Rakesh Bhatnagar
- Succeeded by: Ajit Kumar Chaturvedi

Director at Indian Institute of Technology Gandhinagar
- In office June 2009 – 3 January 2022
- Preceded by: Position Established
- Succeeded by: Rajat Moona

Dean of Resource Planning and Generation at Indian Institute of Technology Kanpur
- In office January 2005 – January 2008

Professor at Indian Institute of Technology Kanpur
- In office 1984–2009

Personal details
- Born: 4 July 1959 (age 67) Lalitpur, Uttar Pradesh
- Education: IIT Roorkee; California Institute of Technology
- Profession: Professor; Academic Administrator
- Known for: Earthquake engineering Structural engineering IIT Gandhinagar
- Awards: Padma Shri
- Website: Personal website

Sudhir Kumar Jain (also Sudhir K. Jain; born 4 July 1959) is an Indian academic who served as the 28th Vice-Chancellor of Banaras Hindu University. He is a civil engineer by education and has formerly served three terms as the founding director of the Indian Institute of Technology Gandhinagar. He has carried out intensive research and development in the fields of seismic design codes, dynamic of buildings, and post-earthquake studies. Beside these, Jain has actively participated in teaching, research activities and development in earthquake engineering focused on developing countries. He is an elected fellow of Indian National Academy of Engineering. He was also elected a member of U.S. National Academy of Engineering (2021) for leadership in earthquake engineering in developing countries.

He has served as the president of International Association of Earthquake Engineering (IAEE) from 2014 to 2018. He also served on the engineering and computer science jury for the Infosys Prize from 2019.

== Education ==
Jain earned Bachelor of Civil Engineering from the University of Roorkee (now IIT Roorkee) in 1979, and masters, and doctoral degrees from the California Institute of Technology, Pasadena in 1980 and 1983 respectively.

== Awards and honors ==
- Thomson Memorial Gold Medal (1979)
- Robert A Millikan Fellowship (1982)
- IIT Roorkee Distinguished Alumnus Award (2018)
- Padma Shri for Science & Engineering (2020)
- California Institute of Technology Distinguished Alumni Award (2022)

== Selected bibliography ==
=== Books ===
- Earthquake rebuilding in Gujarat, India: an EERI recovery reconnaissance report
- Engineering Response to Hazards of Terrorism

=== Articles ===
- Earthquake safety in India: achievements, challenges and opportunities
- Simplified seismic analysis of soil–well–pier system for bridges
- Code Approaches to Seismic Design of Masonry-Infilled Reinforced Concrete Frames: A State-of-the-Art Review
- Analysis of earth dams affected by the 2001 Bhuj Earthquake
- Seismic torsional vibration in elevated tanks

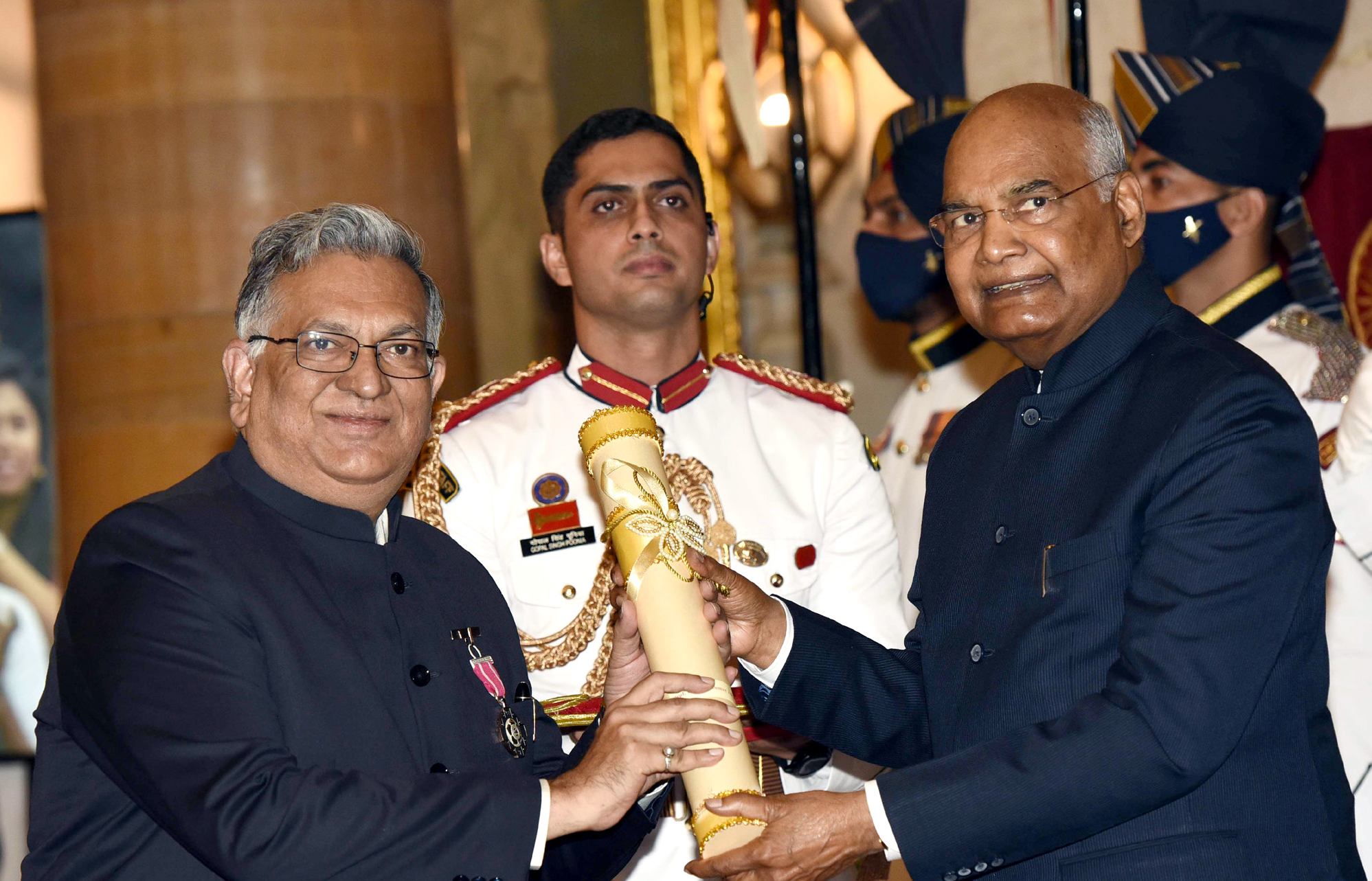
S.K. Jain(left) receiving Padma Shri from President Kovind

== See also ==
- Banaras Hindu University
- IIT Gandhinagar
- IIT Kanpur
- Vice-Chancellor of Banaras Hindu University
