= Banaras Hindu University women's rights protest =

2017 women's rights protest in India

- Date: September 2017
- Location: Banaras Hindu University, Varanasi, Uttar Pradesh, India

The Banaras Hindu University women's rights protest was a series of events which began after a Banaras Hindu University student filed a complaint in September 2017 which said that the university administration did not respond appropriately to reports of sexual harassment on campus. The protest led to clashes between students unions like AISA, SFI and NSUI with the Rashtriya Swayamsevak Sangh's student wing ABVP, the government which emerged again in the 2023 IIT-BHU rape case.

== Protests ==
On 21 September 2017, a woman reported sexual harassment to the university. She claimed that the university responded by blaming her. The next day, 22 September, students organized a protest against the university's treatment of women.

The university's administration filed a First information report against hundreds of students and alleged outsiders for rioting, mischief indented arson, attempt to murder among other sections of Indian Penal Code.

Police used laathi charge in an attempt to get protesters to disperse the protestors. Various protesters reported injuries. Alleged outsiders joined the students in stone-pelting.

Large number of male students joined their female counterparts in protests and silent march against police violence.

=== 2018 protests ===
At the one year anniversary of the protest students organized another protest. The protesters reported that an Akhil Bharatiya Vidyarthi Parishad student group attacked them violently for protesting.

In May 2018, following-up on an inquiry report, the university administration debarred 11 students on charges of vandalism and assault.

=== In other places ===
The protests in Benares triggered protests in Delhi. The National Students' Union of India student groups staged demonstrations in New Delhi against police brutality in BHU, and ABVP held counter-protest. The administration closed campuses temporarily in the district claiming intelligence reports that brutality on BHU students might spark protests in other universities and colleges.

== Reactions ==
Chief Proctor of the university resigned, taking moral responsibility.

Prime Minister Modi discussed a response with the chief minister.

The Governor of Uttar Pradesh called the incident sad. Uttar Pradesh Chief Minister Yogi Adityanath recommended better communication as a way to prevent future such protests, and sought a report from the Divisional commissioner. A committee to look into the protest over an alleged harassment was set-up under Uttar Pradesh Chief Secretary.

The Station House Officer (police station in-charge/SHO) of Lanka police station, the deputy police superintendent, and three additional city magistrates were transferred or removed.

== See also ==
- 2023 IIT-BHU gang rape
