= Govind Malaviya =

Indian freedom fighter, educationist, and politician

Pandit Govind Malaviya
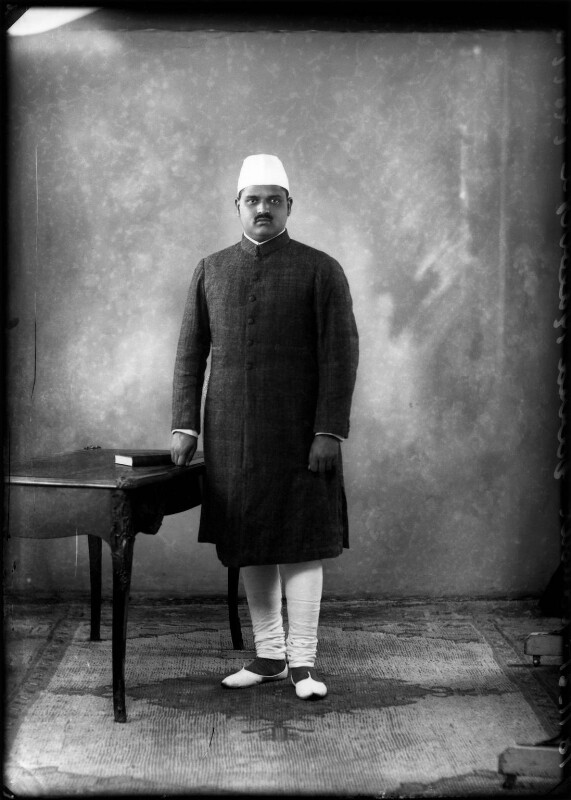
- For Round Table Conference with his father Madan Mohan Malaviya on 18 November 1931, London

Member of Parliament, Lok Sabha
- In office 1952-1961
- Preceded by: B V Keskar
- Succeeded by: Kunwar Krishna Verma
- Constituency: Sultanpur, Uttar Pradesh

6th Vice-Chancellor of Banaras Hindu University
- In office 6 December 1948 - 21 November 1951
- Preceded by: Amarnath Jha
- Succeeded by: Acharya Narendra Dev

Personal details
- Born: 14 September 1902
- Died: 27 February 1961 (aged 58) New Delhi, India
- Party: Indian National Congress
- Spouse: Usha Bhatt (m. 1922–1961)
- Relations: Madan Mohan Malviya (father)
- Children: 1 son (Giridhar), 7 daughters

Pandit Govind Malaviya (14 September 1902 – 27 February 1961) was an Indian freedom fighter, educationist and politician.

== Biography ==
Malaviya was the youngest son of distinguished lawyer and educationist Pandit Madan Mohan Malaviya. Following his early education at the Dharmajnyanopadesha Sanskrit Pathshala and the A. V. School, Allahabad, he graduated from Banaras Hindu University. After joining the Congress Party in 1920, he actively participated in the Independence movement and was imprisoned eight times. In 1930, he was appointed general secretary of the Working Committee of the All India Congress Committee (AICC), and attended the Second Round Table Conference in September 1931 as his father's secretary.

In 1945, he was elected to the Central Legislative Assembly, becoming a member of the Constituent Assembly of India in 1946 and a member of the Provisional Parliament in 1950. He was appointed Pro-Vice-Chancellor of Banaras Hindu University in December 1947, becoming Vice-Chancellor in December 1948 and serving until 1951.

In 1952, Malaviya was elected to the Lok Sabha (lower house of the Parliament of India) from Sultanpur, Uttar Pradesh as a member of the Indian National Congress. Reelected in 1957, he died in office in 1961.

== Personal life ==
He married Usha Bhatt (1905–18 February 2002) on 12 December 1922. The couple had one son, Justice Giridhar Malaviya, and seven daughters.
