= Y. C. Simhadri =

Indian academic and administrator (1941–2021)

Yedla C. Simhadri
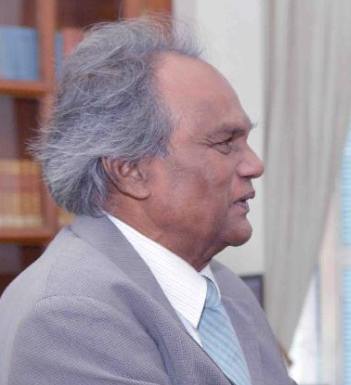
- Prof. Simhadri in 2017

21st Vice-Chancellor of Banaras Hindu University
- In office 31 August 1998 – 20 February 2002
- Appointed by: K. R. Narayanan
- Preceded by: Hari Gautam
- Succeeded by: Patcha Ramachandra Rao

Personal details
- Born: 1941
- Died: 22 May 2021 (aged 79–80)

Yedla C. Simhadri (1941 – 22 May 2021) was an Indian academic and administrator. He served as the vice-chancellor of several Indian universities including Banaras Hindu University, Patna University, Andhra University, and Acharya Nagarjuna University.

== Education ==
Simhadri obtained a Master's degree in Social work and Bachelor of Laws from Andhra University. Later he was awarded scholarships by Indiana State University in the US for a Master's degree in criminology and Sociology. He completed his PhD in Sociology from Case Western Reserve University. He obtained his post-doctoral research degree from the Commonwealth Institute, London. He also obtained a degree in Youth Work from West Germany.

== Academic career ==
In the 1980s, Simhadri worked as a Professor of Sociology at Andhra University. He was a visiting professor at a number of universities in India and abroad. He published over half a dozen books and over 50 articles. He also worked for the United Nations, UNESCO, and United Nations University.

He became the vice-chancellor (VC) of Andhra University in 1991 and served there for the next four years. He was appointed the VC of Banaras Hindu University (BHU) in 1997 when the university was suffering from violence within the campus. He stayed in BHU until 2002 and contributed towards making the university campus safer and conducive to academic activities.

Later in that decade, he served as the Vice-Chancellor of Patna University twice - from 2006 to 2008 and 2014–2017.
