= Acharya Narendra Dev College =

Constituent college in Delhi, India

- Logo of college
- Type: Public
- Established: 1991
- Affiliations: University of Delhi
- Principal: Prof. Ravi Toteja
- Location: Delhi, India; 28°54′N 77°26′E
- Campus: Urban
- Website: andcollege.du.ac.in

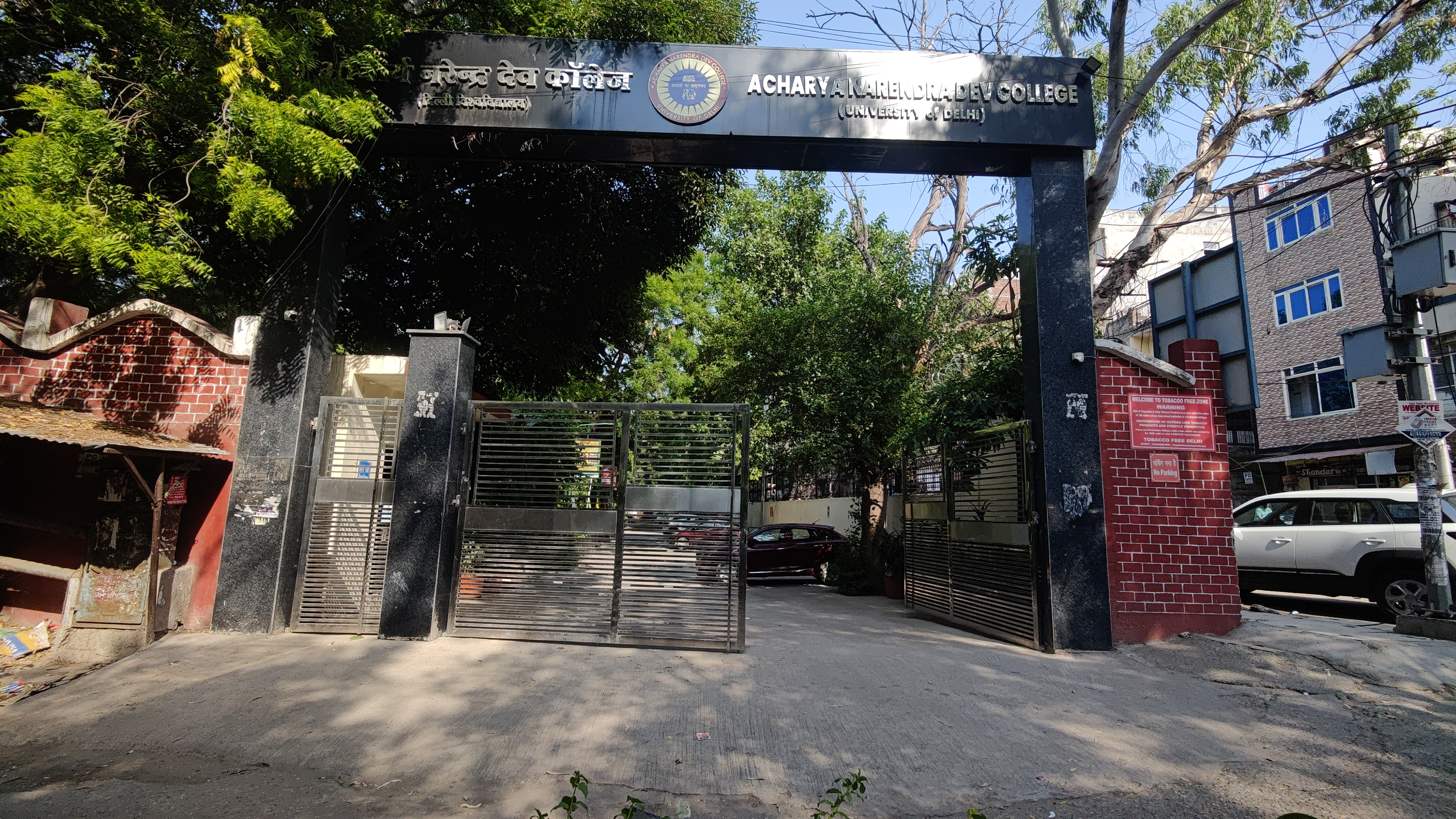
Main gate of the college

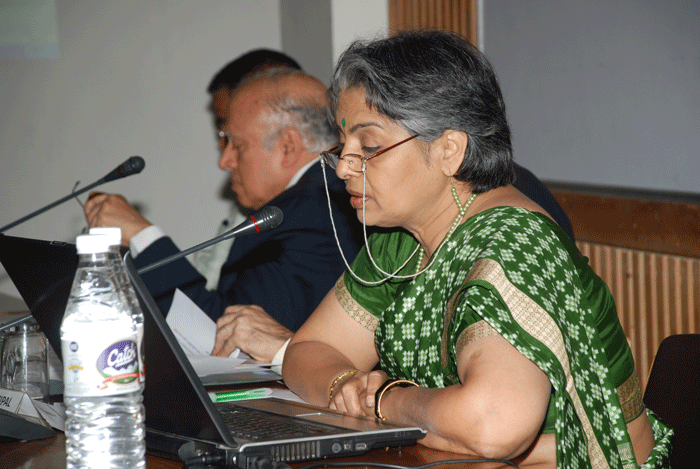
Ex-Principal Savithri Singh at WikiEducator India platform launch.

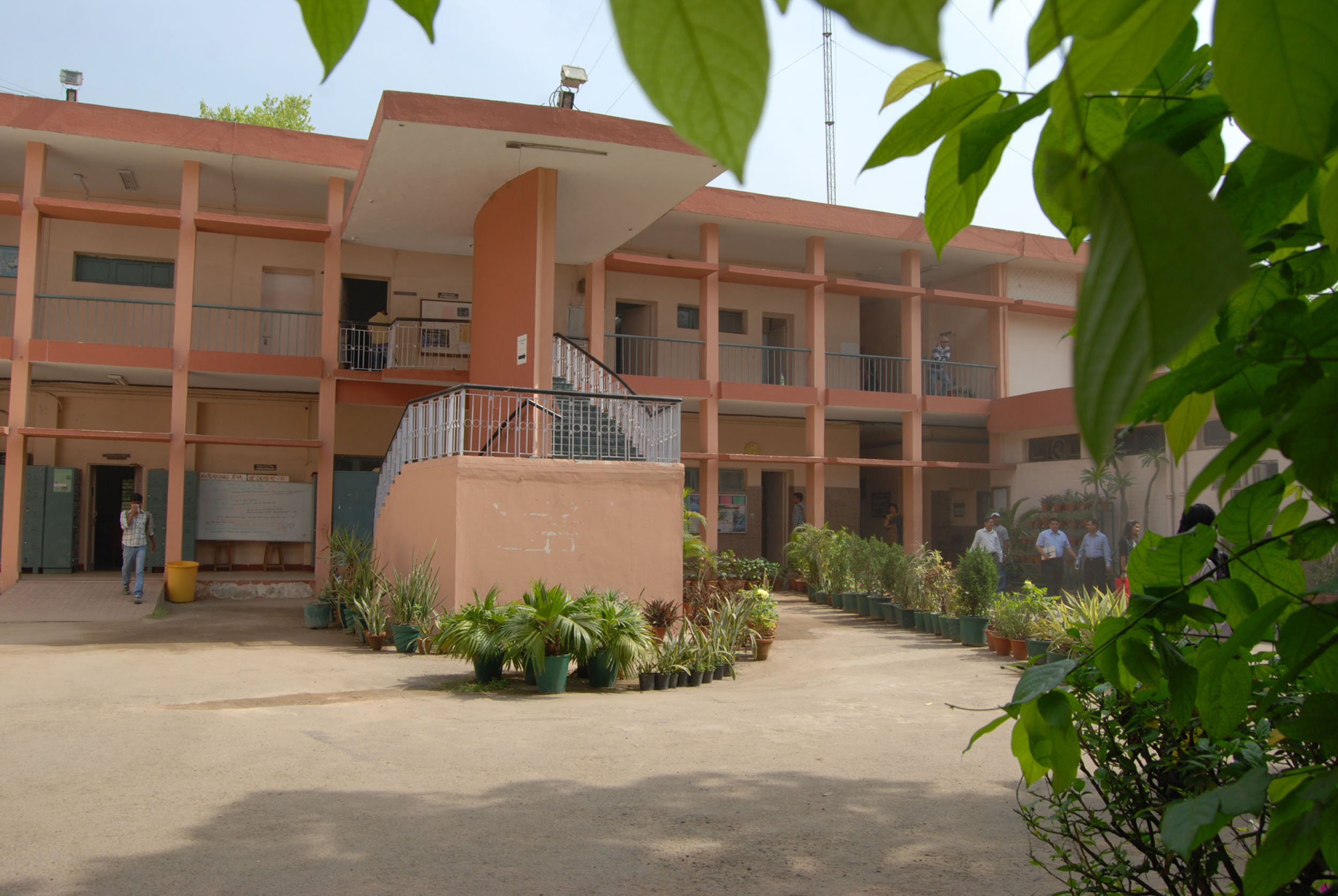
Academic building of the college.

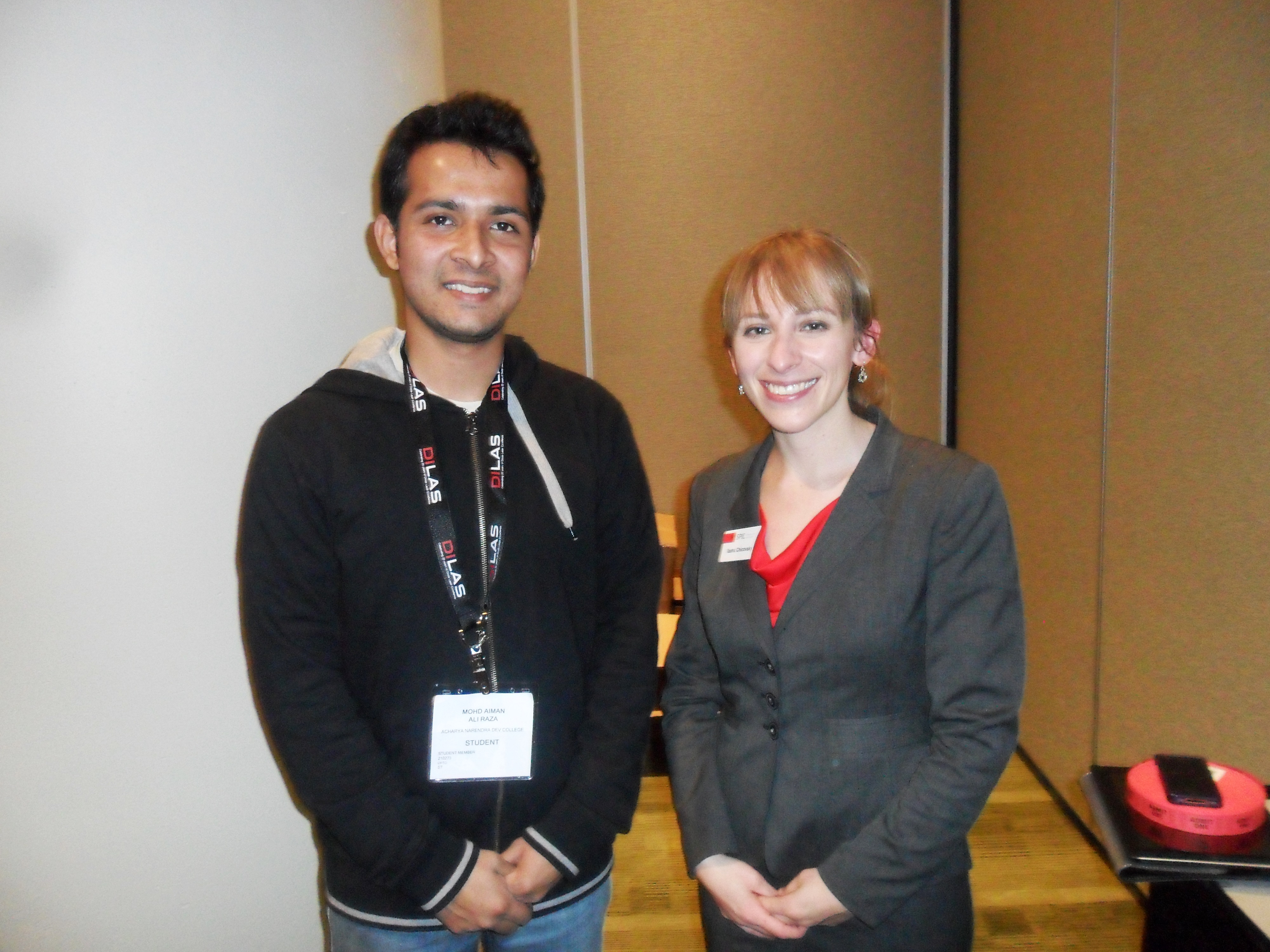
SPIE student member at SPIE Photonics West 2014, San Francisco, US

Acharya Narendra Dev College is a constituent college of University of Delhi situated in Govindpuri (Kalkaji), Delhi, India. Established in 1991, Acharya operates under the aegis of, and is fully funded by, the Government of Delhi. It is named after the great educationist and reformist of modern India, Acharya Narendra Dev.

The college is very accessible via public transport. Govindpuri metro station of violet line is around 1 km from the college.

== Rankings ==
It is ranked 18th among colleges in India by the National Institutional Ranking Framework (NIRF) in 2024.

== Courses offered ==
- Bachelor with Honours in Biomedical Sciences, Botany, Chemistry, Commerce, Mathematics, Physics, Computer Science, Electronics and Zoology
- BSc in Physical Sciences (with Chemistry, Computer Science or Electronics) and Life Sciences.
- Msc in Mathematics and Chemistry

It is the first college of the university to introduce the B.Sc. Honours Biomedical Sciences in 1999. Students can enroll for the postgraduate degree of University of Delhi in Chemistry and Mathematics.

Acharya Narendra Dev College offers part-time certificate and diploma courses in foreign languages:

- French
- German
- Spanish
- Russian.

Besides, the add-on courses ELPC (English Language Proficiency Course) and ECPDT (Effective Communication and Personality Development through Theatre) enrich the students' language, personality and provide learning opportunities.

== Culture and projects ==
Acharya Narendra Dev College along with Wikimedia India and Centre for Internet and Society have been recognized as Affiliates of Creative Commons in India. On 12 November 2013, Creative Commons India was relaunched in New Delhi by the Union Minister for Human Resources Development Dr Shashi Tharoor.

The college believes in promoting open-source software and open education resources. It is the first college in the University of Delhi to migrate to Linux. Having 80 computers in the Web Center and all the computer labs run on Linux OS. Use of proprietary software is kept minimal and only when required by the course material.

Former principal, Savithri Singh, is an elected member of the International Community Council of the Wikieducator and its Vice Chair.

Acharya Narendra Dev College promotes research by students and faculty. One of these research projects is the Innovation and Entrepreneurship Development Cell. The cell also coordinates six projects aimed at promoting innovation and entrepreneurship. To promote research by students the college offers ELITE (Education in a Lively Innovative Training Environment) scholarships to 200 students for summer training and projects.

The Society of Photo-Optical Instrumentation Engineers (SPIE), an international society advancing an interdisciplinary approach to the science and application of light, has formally approved "University of Delhi at Acharya Narendra Dev College SPIE Student Chapter." The college SPIE chapter is highly prominent on the International scale and gets annual funding for members to attend International conferences most notably SPIE Optics+Photonics in San Diego, US, and SPIE Photonics West in San Francisco, US.

Acharya Narendra Dev college also offers extra-curricular activities for students. Student-run societies include ones on gender sensitization, dramatics, debate, electronics, adventure, sports, social outreach, think lab, and others.
