= Rakesh Bhatnagar =

Indian educationist

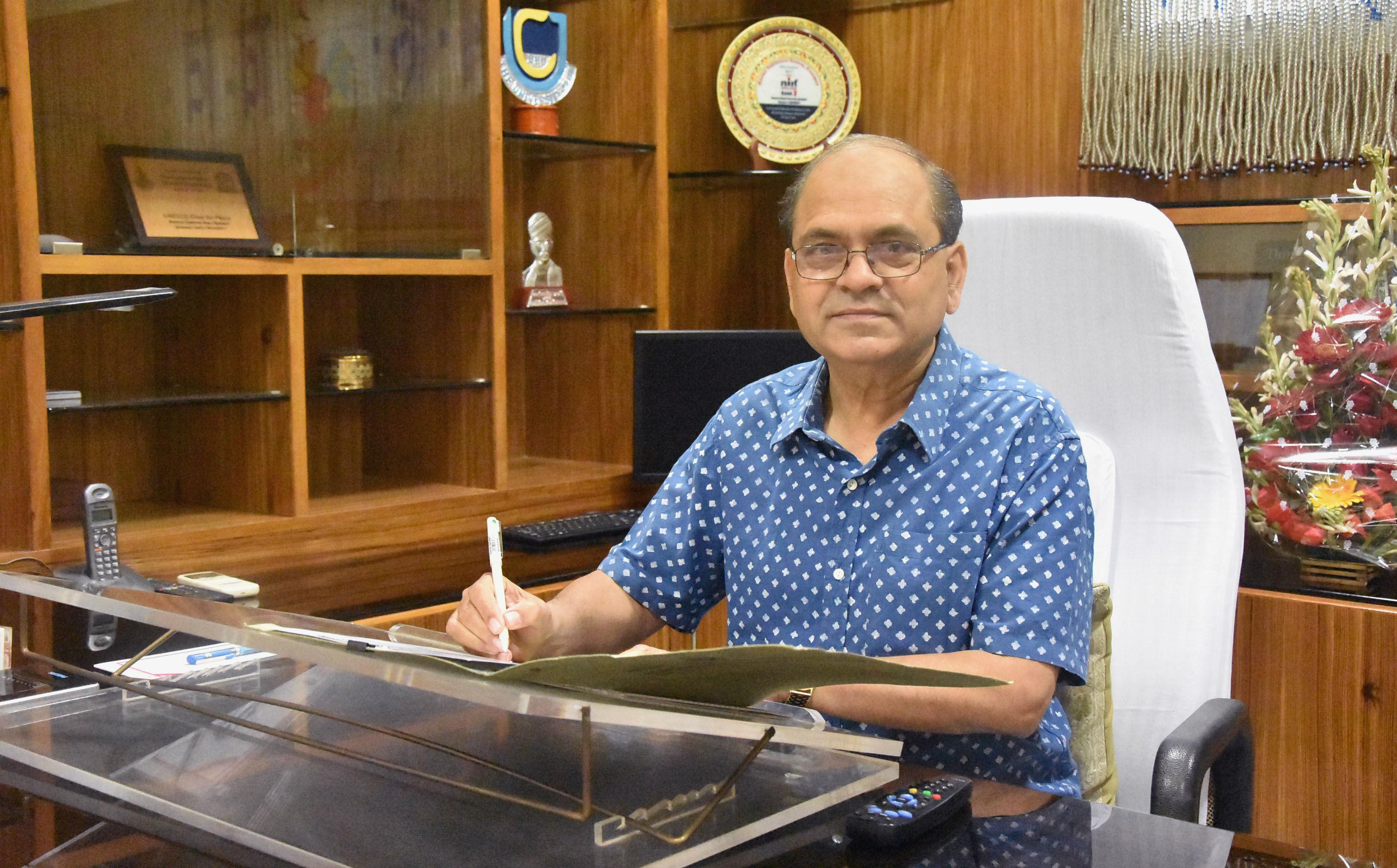
- Bhatnagar in his office at BHU

Vice-Chancellor of Amity University, Jaipur
- In office 6 July 2021 – 6 July 2024
- Preceded by: Arun Patil
- Succeeded by: Amit Jain

27th Vice-Chancellor of Banaras Hindu University
- In office 28 March 2018 – 28 March 2021
- Appointed by: Ramnath Kovind
- Preceded by: Girish Chandra Tripathi
- Succeeded by: Sudhir K. Jain

Personal details
- Born: 31 July 1951 (age 75) Kanpur, Uttar Pradesh, India
- Spouse: Dr. Nirupama Banerjee Bhatnagar
- Education: National Sugar Institute; Kanpur University, Kanpur
- Occupation: Biotechnology; Educationist
- Awards: Presidents Visitor's Award; INSA Fellow; NASI Fellow; IAS Fellow
- Website: Scholar-Profile

Rakesh Bhatnagar is an Indian educationist, scientist, who served as Vice Chancellor of Amity University Rajasthan. Previously he has served as the 27th Vice-Chancellor of Banaras Hindu University.

== Early life ==
He has an M.Sc. from Kanpur University and Phd from National Sugar Institute.

== Career ==
He has served as the dean of the school of biotechnology at Jawaharlal Nehru University (JNU), the Vice Chancellor of Kumaun University, the director of the academic staff college at JNU, and the director of the Advanced Instrumentation Research Facility at JNU. Dr. Bhatnagar also served as the Vice Chancellor of Banaras Hindu University, Varanasi. He helped develop a genetically engineered vaccine against anthrax. He is an elected fellow of several major Indian science academies and is a recipient of many honors, including the 2016 President of India Visitor's Award for Innovation. His team has also developed a DNA vaccine against Rabies. His research group has initiated research in other important infectious disease systems like Mycobacterium, Brucella; aiming to open avenues for their control. His areas of interest are Molecular Biology of Infectious Diseases, Recombinant Vaccine Development, and Programmed Cell Death in Prokaryotes.
