= Save Ganga Movement =

Gandhian non-violent movement

- Location: Varanasi, Haridwar Allahabad and other parts of North India
- Caused by: Pollution and damming of Ganges river in India.
- Methods: Gandhian nonviolence movement
- Status: On hold

Lead figures
Non centralised leadership	Prof. G. D. Agrawal; Smt. Rama Rauta; Acharya Jeetendra

Save Ganga Movement is a widespread Gandhian non-violent movement supported by saints and popular social activists across the Indian States Uttar Pradesh and Bihar in support of the ecological and cultural preservation of Ganges river. The movement emerged in the backdrop of escalating pollution in the Ganges, worsened by idustrialiazation, urbanization, and inadequeate waste management. The movement had a non-centralised leadership, though several organisations were involved in the advocacy efforts such as Ganga Seva Abhiyanam, Pune-based National Women's Organisation (NWO) and other like-minded organisations, with the moral support from many religious leaders, spiritual and political, scientists, environmentalists, writers and social activists. "Ganga Calling – Save Ganga" was another such campaign supported by Indian Council for Enviro-Legal Action.

== Background ==
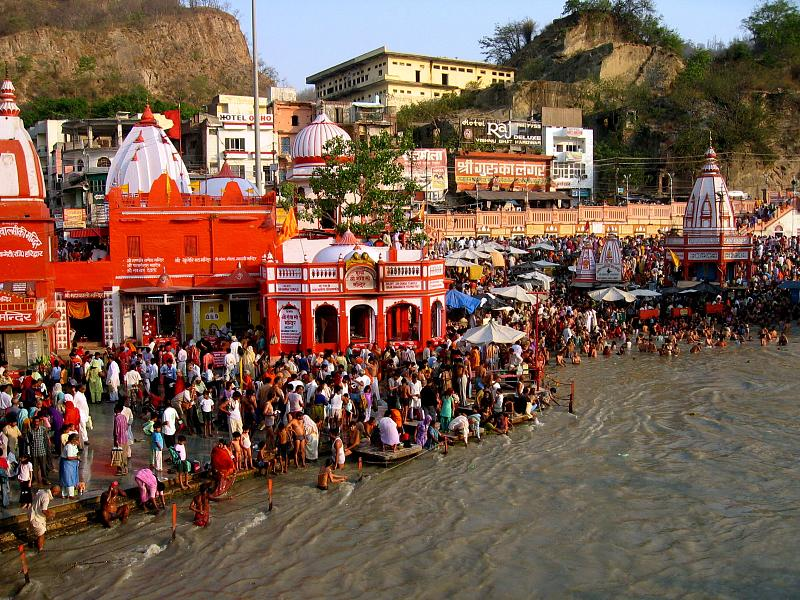
Ganga Dashahara in 2005 brought throngs of bathers to the riverfront in Haridwar. (Religious association of Ganga also accounts for an appreciable degree of pollution.)

Ganges is the largest and the most sacred river of India with enormous spiritual, cultural, and physical influence. It provides water to about 40% of India's population in 11 states. It is estimated that the livelihoods of over 500 million people in India are dependent upon the river, and that one-third of India's population lives within the Ganges Basin. Despite this magnitude of influence and control by the river over present and future of the country, it is allegedly under direct threat from various man made and natural environmental issues.

=== Pollution ===
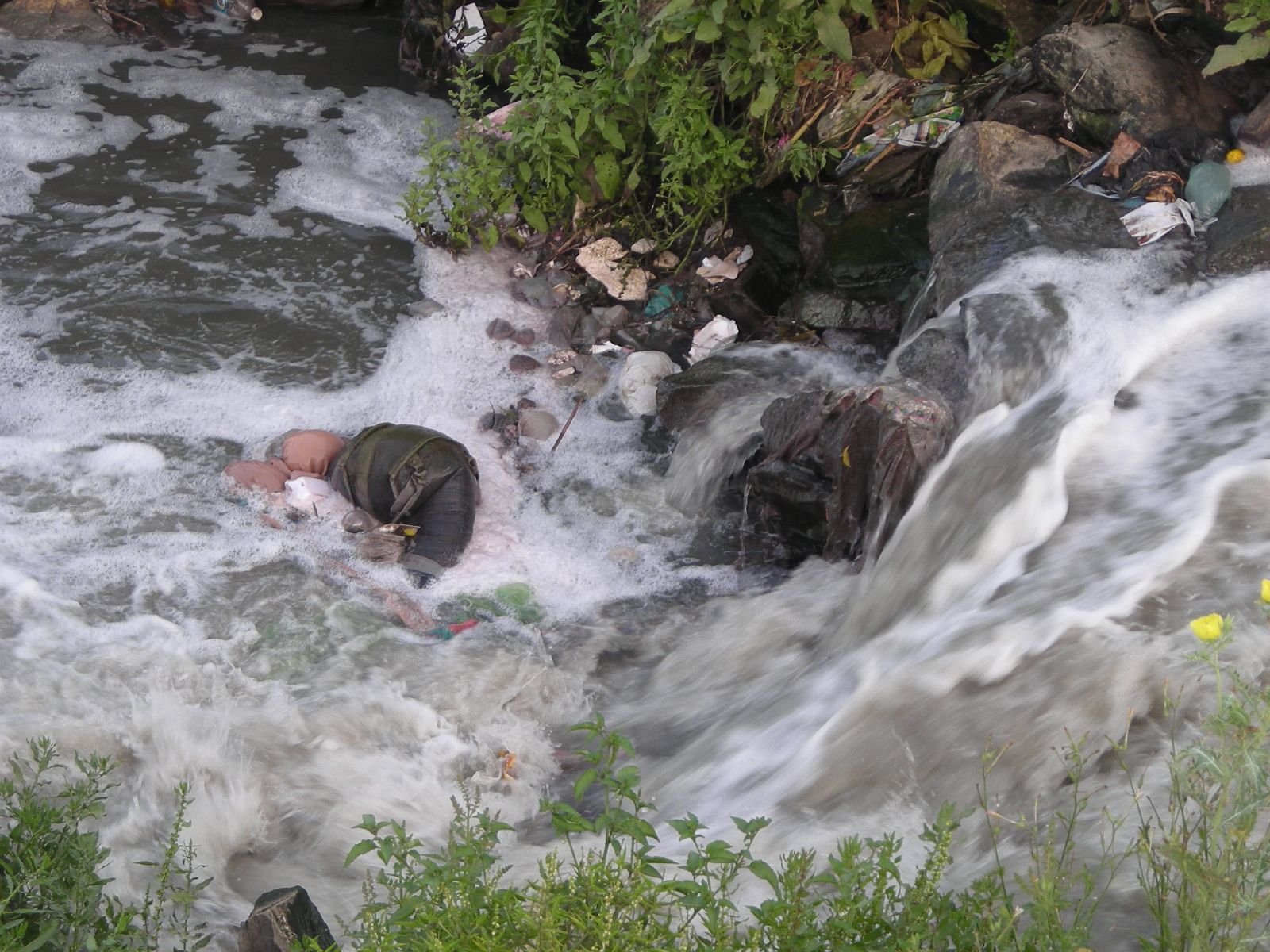
Wastes and left overs of tours and picnics flowing in Ganges.

River Ganges flows through the most densely populated regions of India passing 29 cities with population over 100,000, 23 cities with population between 50,000 and 100,000, and about 48 towns. A sizeable proportion of the effluents in Ganges are caused by this population through domestic usage like bathing, laundry and public defecation. Countless tanneries, chemical plants, textile mills, distilleries, slaughterhouses, and hospitals contribute to the pollution of the Gangas by dumping untreated toxic and non-biodegradable waste into it. It is this sheer volume of pollutants released into the river every day that are causing irreparable damage to the ecosystem and contributing to significant sanitation issues.

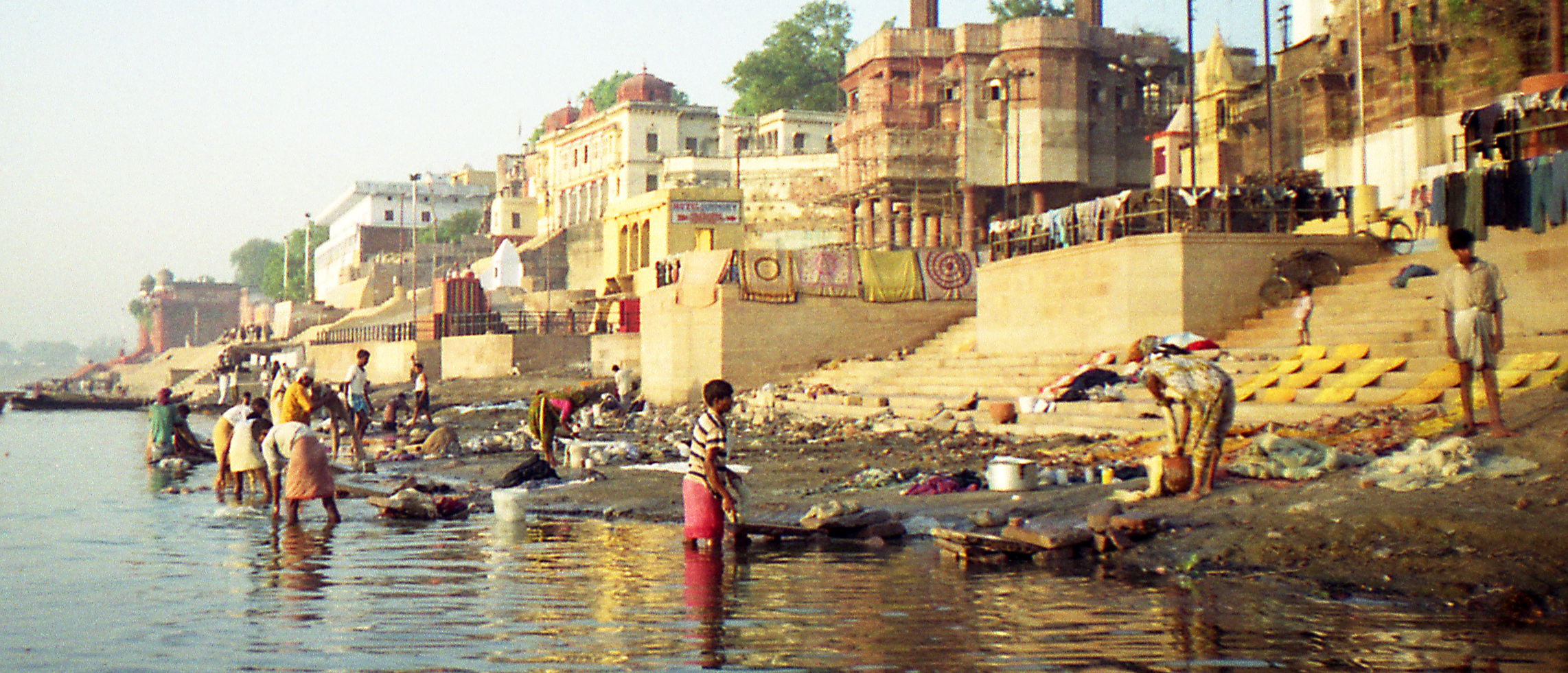
Pollution at the ghats of Varanasi.

=== Dams ===
Built in 1854 during the British colonisation of India, the Haridwar dam has led to decay of the Ganges by greatly diminishing the flow of the river. The Farakka Barrage was built originally to divert fresh water into the Bhagirathi River but has since caused an increase of salinity in the Ganges, having a damaging effect on the ground water and soil along the river. Apart from this, Bangladesh and India faced major tensions due to this barrage. The government of India planned about 300 dams on the Ganges in the near future and the tributaries despite a government-commissioned green panel report that has recommended scrapping 34 of the dams citing environmental concerns.

=== Global warming ===
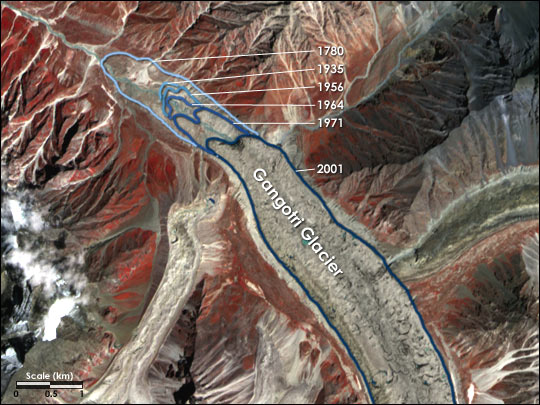
Timeline of retreat of Gangotri glacier (the blue contour lines drawn here to show the recession of the glacier’s terminus over time are approximate).

Gangotri glacier which feeds the river Ganges is 30.2 km long and between 0.5 and 2.5 km wide is one of the largest in the Himalaya. However, Due to global warming it has been receding since 1780, although studies show its retreat quickened after 1971. Over the last 25 years, Gangotri glacier has retreated more than 850 meters, with a recession of 76 meters from 1996 to 1999 alone. The UN 2007 Climate Change Report has suggested that the glacial flow may completely stop by 2030, at which point the Ganges would be reduced to a seasonal river during the monsoon season.

=== Failure of Ganga Action Plan ===
The Ganga Action Plan or GAP was a program launched by Rajiv Gandhi in April 1986 to reduce the pollution load on the river. But the efforts to decrease the pollution level in the river became abortive even after spending ₹ 9017.1 million (~190 million USD adjusting to inflation). Therefore, this plan was withdrawn on 31 March 2000. This plan is described as failure by many scientist and NGOs in their studies.

== Genesis and early mobilisation ==
The movement did not build up suddenly. Concerns about the condition of the Ganges were raised for decades which gained impetus in the past few years owing to awareness and support from keen environmentalists. Furthermore, different studies revealed the deteriorating health of the river. In 1998, Smt Rama Rauta, the founder of National Women's Organization (NWO) under the leadership of Dr. Sushila Nair conceived the necessity to initiate public mobilization based on the principles of non-violence to seek support for Save Ganga Movement – against the pollution of the Ganges and its tributaries. A seminar on Ganga aur hamaaraa daayitvaon (Ganga and our duty) was conducted on 13 November 1998 at Kanpur. Soon popular Gandhians, Shri Sunderlal Bahuguna and Dr. Kanchanlata Sabarwal, also joined the Movement.

The objective of the Movement is, on the one hand, to create mass awareness for uneco-friendly non-violent culture of development for the protection of our life-sustaining natural systems in general and of the sacred Ganga and the Himalayas in particular; on the other hand, to put moral pressure on the government, to take time-bound decisive steps to completely and permanently save the Ganga symbolizing all rivers and water bodies, and the Giriraj Himalayas, symbolizing all mountains forests and wildlife.

— Smt. Rana Rauta, an eminent member of NRGBA and convener of Save Ganga Movement

== Movement expansion ==
=== Mega rally of June 2012 ===
Moved by the government's inaction towards saving the Ganges, the eminent Ganga Mukti Sangram Saamiti decided to initiate a mass drive by gathering thousands of Ganga Devotees along with the Ganga Rath which travelled through Varanasi on 14 June and then to Allahabad, Kanpur, Matura, Vrindavan and finally reach to Delhi on 17 June. Shankaracharya of Dwarka Sharda Pithas Swami Svarūpānanda Sarasvatī who also joined the movement at Jantar Mantar in Delhi gave an ultimatum of three months to the Central government over the government's apathetic attitude towards the protection and conservation of the National River. Swami Avimukteshwaranand Sarasvatī, convener of Gangas Seva Abhiyanam alleged the Central Government of overhearing their demands and trying to obstruct the movement.

== Key figures ==
=== Swami Jitendranand Saraswati alias Acharya Jitendra ===
Swami Jitendranand Saraswati alias Acharya Jitendra is National General Secretary of Ganga Mahasabha. He is working for Ganga since 2000. He is a well known Social Activist(Environmentalist) in India. It was his effort to convince Mr. Lal Krishna Advani in 2008 to compel the Chief Minister B.C. Khanduri to abandon all state hydro-dam projects on the Ganga and persuade Professor Guru Das Agrawal G. D. Agrawal to give up his fast within 24 hours. In 2010 Again Acharya Jitendra played a crucial role to stop the Loharinag Pala Hydel Project – On The Ganga. As K.N. Govinda said he worked behind the scenes for three years, interfacing with people and like Baba Ramdev and Acharya Jitendra, environmentalists and politicians of all hues. He even approached senior Congress leaders for their support. When a favourable atmosphere was created, he met Pranab Mukherjee, leading a delegation of the Ganga Mahasabha. He then spoke to senior Vishva Hindu Parishad leader Ashok Singhal and the Bharatiya Janata Party’s Rajnath Singh, who persuaded CM Ramesh Pokhriyal to write to the PM, asking him to scrap the Loharinag Pala project.

Ganga Mahasabha will conduct awareness campaigns at all places in the five states through which the Ganga crosses.

— Swami Jitendranand Saraswati to TOI

=== Nigamanand ===
In early 2011, a Hindu seer named Swami Nigamananda Saraswati fasted unto death, protesting against illegal mining happening in the district of Haridwar (in Uttarakhand) resulting in pollution. Following his death in June 2011, his Ashram leader Swami Shivananda fasted for 11 days starting on 25 November 2011, taking his movement forward. Finally, the Uttarakhand government released an order to ban illegal mining all over Haridwar district. According to administration officials, quarrying in the Ganges would now be studied by a special committee which would assess its environmental impacts the river and its nearby areas.

=== Prof. G. D. Agrawal ===
Noted environmental activist, Prof. G. D. Agrawal Patron of Ganga Mahasabha sat ng construction in this sensitive and sacred region of India. Due to support from other social activists like Anna Hazare, the Prime Minister of India, Manmohan Singh admitted publicly to cease any further hydroelectric damming of the Ganga in Uttarakhand. He also called for a National River Ganga Basin Authority (NRGBA) meeting and urged the authorities to utilize the ₹ 26 billion (about 520M US$) sanctioned "for creating sewer networks, sewage treatment plants, sewage pumping stations, electric crematoria, community toilets and development of river fronts".

=== Narendra Modi ===
Chief Minister of Gujarat, now Prime Minister of India Narendra Modi has been very bent on the issue of the holy river, and has promised the Parliament of India to clean the river as the density of coli-form bacteria have risen from 5,000 per 100ml to 58,000 per 100ml, nearly 121 times over the acceptable limit. So far, ₹ 20,000 crore has gone into the cleaning of the Ganga. Narendra Modi has also offered the gifts he received during his tenure as PM of the nation for bidding. The amount received from the bidding will be utilized for the cause.

=== Rama Rauta ===
Rama Rauta founded the Save Ganga Movement in 1998 with a seminar on 'Ganga Aur Humara Daayitva' at Kanpur understanding the need of a nationwide collective movement to the cause and also a need of a holistic solution to the various issues faced by the river. She conceptualised the movement with Gandhian ideology and soon this movement was supported or joined by various eminent Gandhians, religious leaders from various faiths, legal experts, eminent political leaders and various scientific organisations such as IIT, CSIR labs such as NEERI, NBRI, ITRC and many like-minded NGOs. A holistic roadmap detailing short-term and long-term solution to the impending ecological crisis drafted by the continuous churning of the intellectuals associated with this movement has been a reference guide to the Governments working towards making the Ganga "Aviral " and "Nirmal".

== Demands ==
The movement is solely aimed at one goal – to prevent the anti-nature, anti-human, anti-environment activities against the Ganges and sustain the cultural importance, holiness and age old heritage of the same. Though most of the demands are directly related to the pollution and construction works overs the Ganges, there are ought to be several demands related indirectly to these.

=== No construction ===
It is demanded that any kind of damming or construction work in the upper course of the Ganges should be strictly disallowed. It should be declared a Wild River zone and visits by tourists and people to Gangotri National Park should also be regulated and toned down. Eco-friendly tourism should replace the present eco-hostile tourism. Time-bound steps for non-commercial afforestation of the Uttarakhand should be undertaken and these activities should be carried out by the local people, using saplings of local plants. This demand was backed by a recent report prepared by the state-funded Wildlife Institute of India that recommended scrapping 34 of the Ganges dam projects, citing environmental concerns.

=== Pollution regulation ===
Ganga suffers from large scale pollution due to common practices like bathing, washing, putting flowers and immersing idols in the river waters that create filthy and unhygienic conditions. Dismal civic conditions, bad smell and unavailability of basic amenities like toilets and changing rooms could be experienced. Most of the ghats could be seen with a series of iron grills erected on stony platform, laden with heaps of garbage and rotten stuff. Animal loitering on ghats, troubling the residents and devotees is the other problem.

It is necessary to frame some rules and guidelines for the Civic authorities and municipalities to carry out a scheduled and continued cleaning effort from the concerned officials.

=== Industrialization control ===
Since, Industries dump a large quantity of inorganic and non-bio degradable wastes into the Ganga and other rivers, It is demanded that further establishments of any kind of new Industry with poor management shouldn't be undertaken. Also, those who are flouting the pollution regulation norms should be checked at once. Afforestation and efforts to save wild life in the Himalayas should be regulated by a high powered committee.

=== Awareness ===
Mass awareness against environmental degradation, especially against pollution of air, water and land and deforestation and destruction of wildlife should be undertaken.

- T.V. and Radio are to be persuaded to give a substantial amount of prime time to create such awareness, informing regularly about the water pollution levels of major rivers and of air pollution levels in big cities and their adverse effect on the common people.
- National laboratories such as NEERI, Thermal Research Centre (CPRI), etc., must regularly monitor the pollution levels of major rivers and inform the public about the hazardous effects through various forms of mass media.
- A comprehensive website on the Ganges and other rivers of our country should be created for networking of various organisations and people involved in the Ganga Action Plan and for creating necessary mass-awareness for saving the Ganges and other rivers of our country.
- Environmental ethics should be taught as a part of the syllabus on ethics, both at the school as well as at the college level. Teaching environmental ethics without discussing the value and means of an ethical life would be of little significance. We must study critically the views of great religions and of great teachers and thinkers of mankind about various fundamental issues of ethics.

=== Monitoring committee ===
It is demanded that a committee of experts to monitor the progress of the governmental course of actions in this direction should be appointed. It should report all of its findings and actions to the Supreme Court of India which direct the Central and State Governments.

== Government's efforts ==
=== Panel to review projects on Ganges ===
Amid the building pressure from the Hindu leaders in the June mega rally, the government proposed to set up an expert-panel which would review the situation and examine the ecological impact of hydel projects taken on the Himalayan rivers. The committee includes representatives from the ministries of environment, power, and water resources and other authorities and research institutions. From outside the government, the PMO has chosen director general of Centre for Science and Environment Sunita Narain, former professor of IIT-BHU and mahant of Sankat Mochan temple at Varanasi Virbhadra Mishra and head of Tarun Bharat Sangh-Rajendra Singh. The committee will also inspect previous reports by IIT Roorkee and Wildlife Institute of India.

=== NGRBA ===
To fulfill the demands of activists to have an independent monitoring committee for Ganges, the government has proposed to upgrade the existing National Ganga River Basin Authority (NRGBA) to the level of an independent commission along the lines of the National Human Rights Commission through a new law.

== Controversies ==
- Those groups who backed the construction of Hydel Power projects on course of river Ganga, alleged that the agitators protesting against them were funded by US, so that India would buy Uranium from them to run its Nuclear Power Plants.
- Controversies were raised about alleged fixing of the agitation among the sadhus and the Congress party. It is known that senior Congress leaders share old association with the Shankaracharya of Shrada Jyotish and Dwarka Peeths Swami Swaroopanand Saraswati. Since the launch of stir by the Ganga Seva Abhiyanam, initiated by the disciples of Shankaracharya, the latter stayed away. However, the union government soon sprung into action after the Shankaracharya reached the city to participate in the agitation. It raised rumours of having this meet up between the two to be fixed.

== Current state ==
The movement which made most of the news for 168 days, culminated to a halt by its organizers after the then union coal minister Sriprakash Jaiswal arrived in Delhi with the then PM Manmohan Singh's letter assuring of no new dam projects to start while works on those which have already started would also be stopped. An inter-ministerial committee constituted by the Prime Minister itself will submit its study report on dams creating hurdle in the flow of Ganga in the same period. It was decided by the organising committee that the Mahasangram would be halted only for three months and shall resume again in September if no sufficient action is taken.
