= People's Science Institute =

Non-governmental organization in India

The People's Science Institute is a non-governmental organization in Dehradun, which promote natural resource management, conservation biology, and sustainable development. It was established in 1988.

== Founding ==
The stated mission of the organization is "To help eradicate poverty through the empowerment of the poor and the productive, sustainable and equitable use of available human and natural resources."

== Activism ==
=== Ganges pollution ===
The People's Science Institute regularly speaks out about action to be taken to reduce pollution of the Ganges.

=== River damming ===
G. D. Agrawal, a chair of the People's Science Institute, undertook a fast to protest government inaction on Ganges preservation. Specifically he was seeking a halt to construction of the Loharinag Pala Hydro Power Project and the Pala Maneri project along Bhagirathi River.

Other institute staff have written similarly on topics relating to mass relocation of water for hydroengineering projects.

Recently, the director of The People’s Science Institute, Debashish Sen, said that the institute is currently reviving 45 springs in Himachal Pradesh.
