= Amar Kanwar =

Indian filmmaker

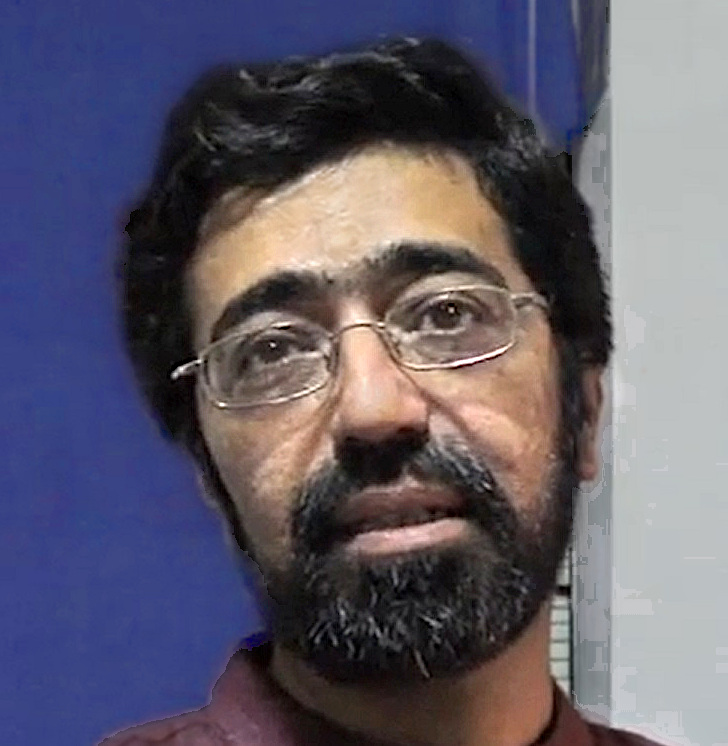
- Amar Kanwar in 2012
- Born: 1964 (age 61–62); New Delhi, India
- Education: Ramjas College (1985); Jamia Millia Islamia (1987)
- Occupation: Filmmaker

Amar Kanwar (born 1964) is an Indian filmmaker. His work challenges the limits of the medium in order to create complex narratives traversing several terrains such as labour and indigenous rights, gender, religious fundamentalism and ecology.

== Early life and career ==
Kanwar was born in New Delhi in 1964 where he continues to live and work as a filmmaker. Kanwar studied at the Department of History, Ramjas College, Delhi University (1982-1985), and at the Mass Communication Research Center, Jamia Millia Islamia, New Delhi (1985–87). After making a few films, Kanwar joined the People's Science Institute in 1988 as a researcher on occupational health and safety in the coal-mining belt of Madhya Pradesh in central India. He returned to filmmaking in 1990, and his films were then shown primarily in public campaigns, community spaces and film festivals in India and across the world. In 2002, Kanwar was invited to exhibit at Documenta 11 in Kassel whereupon his work has also been presented in several art exhibitions and museums. Connecting with diverse audiences, in multiple public spaces, Kanwar also participated in the next three editions of the Documenta exhibition in 2007, 2012 and 2017. He has been an eminent voice in film and art for the past two decades. Kanwar was one of the three curators for Istanbul Biennial 2021.

== Key works ==
His key works include A Season Outside, an essay film on violence; A Night of Prophecy, which focuses on the poetry of resistance; the multi-projection installation The Lightning Testimonies, which addresses sexual violence in public conflicts; and The Torn First Pages, concerning the Burmese democracy movement. Kanwar's recent work, The Sovereign Forest (2012 – ongoing), examines the politics of violence and justice, our understanding of crime, human rights, and ecology. It engages viewers in manifold ways of seeing and comprehending as it presents a set of propositions that investigates the notion of "poetry as evidence"; and Such a Morning, a modern parable about two people’s quiet engagement with truth.

In 2018, Kanwar was part of the selection committee that nominated Ruangrupa as artistic director of Documenta fifteen.

=== The Sovereign Forest ===
Kanwar addresses the overtaking and destruction of indigenous land in his most extensive mixed media installation "The Sovereign Forest," including films, projections on handmade books, seeds, and photographs. He tells the story from the perspective of farmers, fishermen, citizens, and victims of violence: what did they lose with the land during the industrial and governmental overtaking of Odisha, India? In one section of his installation, he arranges 272 varieties of indigenous rice seeds, collected and preserved by a local farmer of Odisha. Kanwar acknowledges that the agriculture on the land was not used just for survival, but that the seeds had different personalities, flavors, meanings to the farmers and people who lived there. He writes: "Farmers have always named their seeds. They have people names. Often of loved ones. Like children." Kanwar highlights the landscape of Odisha just before it began to be erased, showing the beauty and value of what was unjustly taken away.

The Sovereign Forest caption ends with the question he asks himself and his audience: Can an artist intervene in this scenario? And if so, how and where? Can new temporary cultural institutions and processes be created to respond to this situation? How to understand the crime? Is legally permissible evidence adequate to understand the extent and nature of a crime? Can ‘poetry’ be presented as ‘evidence’ in a criminal or political trial? ""

== Awards ==
Kanwar has received several awards for his work as a filmmaker and artist, including the IHME Helsinki Commission (2022); Prince Claus Award (2017); Golden Gate at the San Francisco Film Festival (1999); the Edvard Munch Award for Contemporary Art, Norway (2005); and Leonore Annenberg Prize for Art and Social Change (2014). Other awards have been Best Public Service Short Film at Vatavaran International Environment Film Festival, New Delhi (2012); Best Film Award at One Billion Eyes Film Festival, Chennai (2011); Jury Special Mention at One Billion Eyes Film Festival, Chennai (2009); Honorary Doctorate in Fine Arts, Maine College of Art, USA (2006); Certificate of Merit at San Francisco International Film Festival, California, USA (2002); Golden Tree Award at Vatavaran, National Environment & Wildlife Film Festival, New Delhi (2002); The Grand Prix, EnviroFilm, Slovak Republic (2002); National Jury Award at Mumbai International Film Festival, India (2002); The First Prize at Torino International Environment Film Festival, Italy (2002); Jury's Award at Film South Asia, Kathmandu, Nepal (2001); MacArthur Fellowship, India (2000); Golden Orange Award at 36th Antalya International Film Festival, Turkey (1999) and the Golden Conch Award at Mumbai International Film Festival, India (1998).

== Exhibitions ==
Recent solo exhibitions of Kanwar's work have been held at the Metropolitan Museum of Art, New York (2022); Ishara Art Foundation, Dubai (2020); NYUAD Art Gallery, Abu Dhabi (2020); Museo Nacional Thyssen-Bornemisza, Madrid (2019); Tate Modern, London (2018); Bildmuseet, Umea University, Sweden (2017 - 2018); Goethe Institut/Max Mueller Bhavan, Mumbai (2016) and at the Assam State Museum in collaboration with Kiran Nadar Museum of Art and North East Network, India (2015). In 2013 and 2014 at the Art Institute of Chicago, USA; the Yorkshire Sculpture Park, U.K.; Thyssen-Bornemisza Art Contemporary (TBA 21), Vienna, Austria and at the Fotomuseum Winterthur, Switzerland (2012).

Recent group exhibitions have been presented at Castello Di Rivoli, Turin (2022); Documenta 14, Athens and Kassel (2017); The Garden Sees, Megaron, Athens (2017); #Resist, Goethe-Gallery & Black Box Studio, Hong Kong (2017); the Frac des Pays de la Loire, Carquefou (2016); the Devi Art Foundation with Salima Hashmi, New Delhi (2016); MDE'15, Colombia (2015); Kemper Art Museum, St. Louis, USA (2014); Kiran Nadar Museum of Art, New Delhi, India (2014); 56th Carnegie International, USA (2013); Guggenheim Museum, New York, USA (2013 and 2012); 13th Istanbul Biennial, Turkey (2013); 5th Moscow Biennale of Contemporary Art, Russia (2013); 11th and 15th Sharjah Biennale, UAE (2013, 2023); 1st Kochi Biennale, India (2013); Tarra Warra Museum of Art, Victoria, Australia (2013) and the Bristol Museum, U.K. (2013). Kanwar has also participated in Documenta 11, 12 and 13 in Kassel, Germany (2002, 2007, 2012).

Other solo exhibitions have been at the Stedelijk Museum, Amsterdam, Netherlands (2008); Haus der Kundst, Munich, Germany (2008); the Whitechapel Art Gallery, London, U.K. (2007); the National Museum of Art, Architecture and Design, Oslo, Norway (2006) and the Renaissance Society, Chicago, USA (2004).

== Retrospectives ==
Retrospectives of his films have been held at film festivals including the 5th International Documentary and Short Film Festival of Kerala, Kerala State (2012); the 13th Madurai International Documentary and Short Film Festival (2011); the Documentary Dream Show, Tokyo (2010); the Parallel Perspectives Film Festival, Hyderabad (2008); and the 9th International Short Film Festival, Bangladesh (2005).

== Selected works ==
- Such a Morning (2017)
- The Sovereign Forest (2011-2015) which includes films ‘A Love Story’, (2010) and ‘The Scene of Crime’ (2011)
- The Commons (2011)
- The Torn First Pages Part I, II and III (2004-2008) which includes films 'The Face' (2004) ‘Thet Win Aung’ (2004) ‘Ma Win Maw Oo’ (2004) ‘The Bodhi Tree’ (2004) and ‘Somewhere in May’ (2005)
- The Lightning Testimonies (2007)
- Henningsvaer (2006)
- To Remember (2003)
- A Night of Prophecy (2002)
- Azaadi/ Freedom (2002)
- King of Dreams (2001)
- Baphlimali 173 (2001)
- The Many Faces of Madness (2000)
- A Season Outside (1997)
- Marubhumi (1996)
- Earth as Witness (1994)
- Talash (1993)
- The Leather Trilogy (1992)
- Lal Hara Lehrake (1992)
