= Babhanpura =

- village
- Location in Uttar Pradesh, India Babhanpura (India)
- Coordinates: 25°21′5″N 83°5′44″E
- Country: India
- State: Uttar Pradesh
- District: Varanasi

Government
  - Body: Gram panchayat

Population
  - Total: 2,633

Languages
  - Official: Hindi
- Time zone: UTC+5:30 (IST)
- PIN: 221007
- Nearest city: Varanasi
- Sex ratio: 1.0847 ♂/♀
- Lok Sabha constituency: Varanasi
- Vidhan Sabha constituency: Shivpur

Bhabhanpura is a village on the outskirts of Varanasi city, located 7 km away from the heart of the city. Total population of the village is 2,992 (1,546 male and 1,446 female).

== Temples ==
Nearby temples are an ancient Shiva temple on the ghat of Holy Ganges at Sihvar, and a Hanuman temple. Many rituals of this village, including marriages, are performed at Garva baba and Bhagauti Maa (Maa Durga). A Sankhya Yoga Ashram (Kapila Mandir) has been constructed at the same place by Swamiji Shree Om Prakash Aranya Ji. Swamiji's Kapila Ashram is at Sarnath and he propagates Samkhya Yoga darshan of Kapila Muni. A new Durga mata temple is constructed, where functions are held during Chaitra and Sharad navratra.

== History ==
Raja Jaichandra of Kannauj and Banaras performed "Jatakarma rite" and "Namkaran Sanskar" of his son Harishchandra at this place on 10 August 1175 A.D. and 31 August 1175 A.D. respectively. According to a Kamauli inscription (Kamauli is an adjacent village), Raja Jaichandra was crowned king on 21 June 1170 A.D. Muslim accounts, describe him as the Rāi of Banaras (king of Varanasi). The locations around this village remained the capital of major portions of Northern India during the 12th century A.D. for at least 100 years. Muslim historian Ibn Asir in his work Kamil-ul-Tawarikh says that "the king of Benaras was the greatest king in India and possessed the largest territory, extending lengthwise from the borders of China to the province of Malwa, and in breadth from the sea to within ten days journey to Lahore". Harishchandra succeeded Jaichandra on the Gahadavala throne. In an 1197 CE Kotwa inscription (Kotwa is an adjacent village), he assumes the titles of a sovereign. Nearby villages around Babhanpura are Kamauli, Kotwa, Nevada, Raipura, and Sehvar (Shivbar).

== Education ==
There is a primary school in a nearby Raipura village.

== Infrastructure projects ==
A four-lane ring road, proposed to be constructed around Varanasi City, would pass through Babhanpura. Partial work over ring road under Phase-I has been completed up to Sandaha near Sarnath. Ring road traversing through Babhanpura will be taken up under Phase II, where a 6 lane major bridge of 1.4 km would be constructed over river Ganga. With the construction of Ring road, the distance between Babhanpura up to Lal Bahadur Shastri International airport, Babatpur and Mughalsarai railway station would be reduced considerably. The construction of Sarai Mohana and Konia bridge over river Varuna will bring the village, much closer to Varanasi city centre.

Babhanpura village is proposed to be included in Varanasi nagar nigam. The village is also chosen under "Namami Gange programme" under National mission for clean Ganga (Ministry of Water Resources).
