= Shobhana Ranade =

Indian social worker (1924–2024)

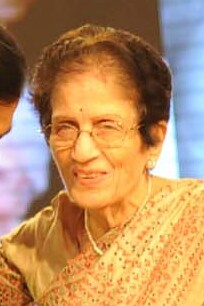
- Ranade in 2012
- Born: 26 October 1924; Poona, Bombay Presidency, British India
- Died: 4 August 2024 (aged 99)
- Occupation: Social worker
- Awards: Padma Bhushan; Jamnalal Bajaj Award; CNN IBN Real Heroes 2012 Life Time Achievement Award; Rabindranath Tagore Prize; Pride of Pune Award; Rajeev Gandhi Manav Seva Award; National Award; Mahatma Gandhi Award

Shobhana Ranade (26 October 1924 – 4 August 2024) was an Indian social worker and Gandhian, known for her services towards her cause of destitute women and children. The Government of India honoured her in 2011, with the Padma Bhushan—the third highest civilian award—for her services to the society.

== Biography ==
Sawarkar was famous during our schooldays and our generation was enthused by his message of love and devotion to Mother India, says Shobhana Ranade, Bhave used to call me Shobhaniya. Mahatma taught us about non-violence and help the downtrodden.

The Real Heroes Award
- Presented by: Reliance Industries CNN-IBN

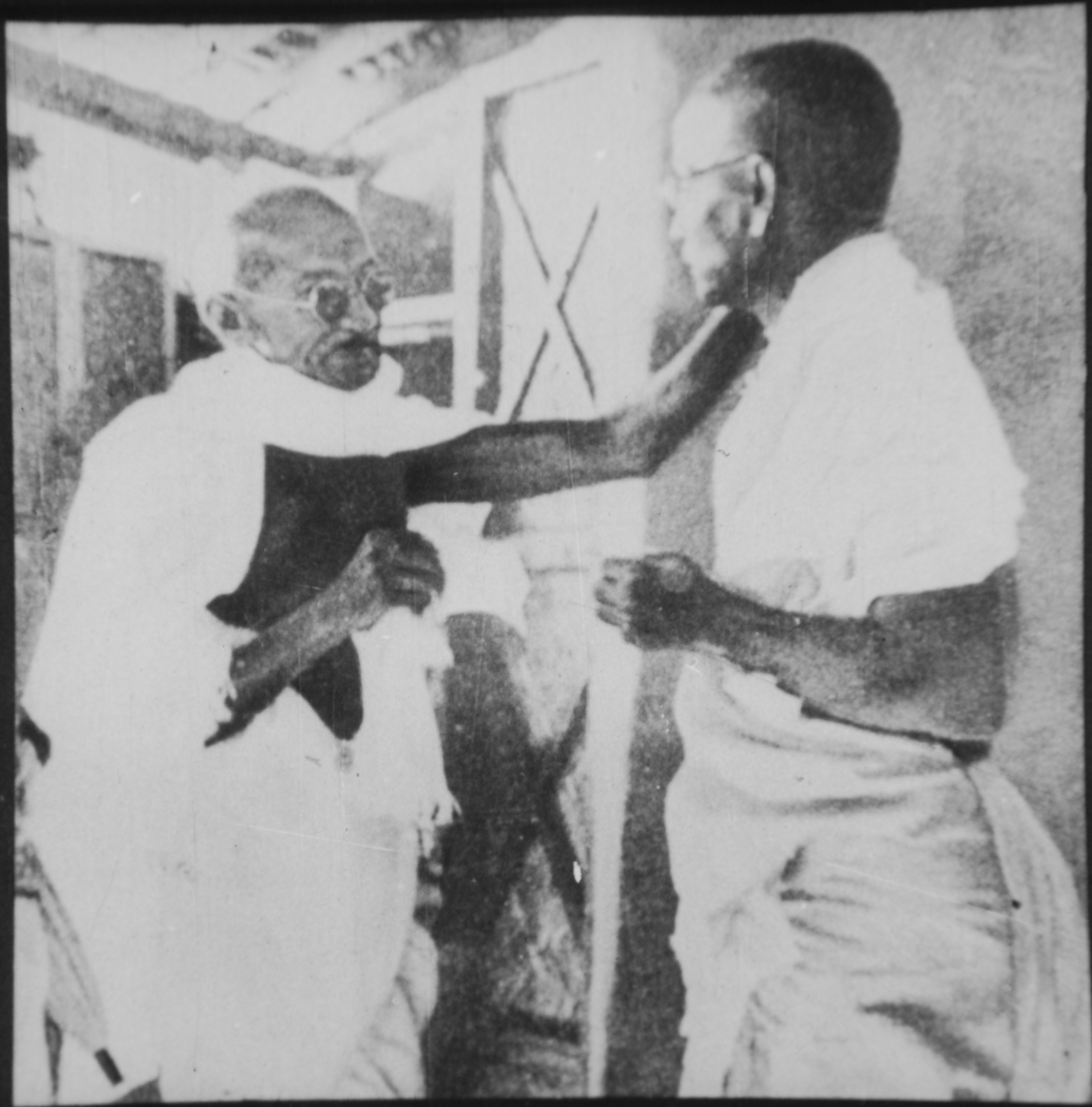
Gandhi and Vinoba

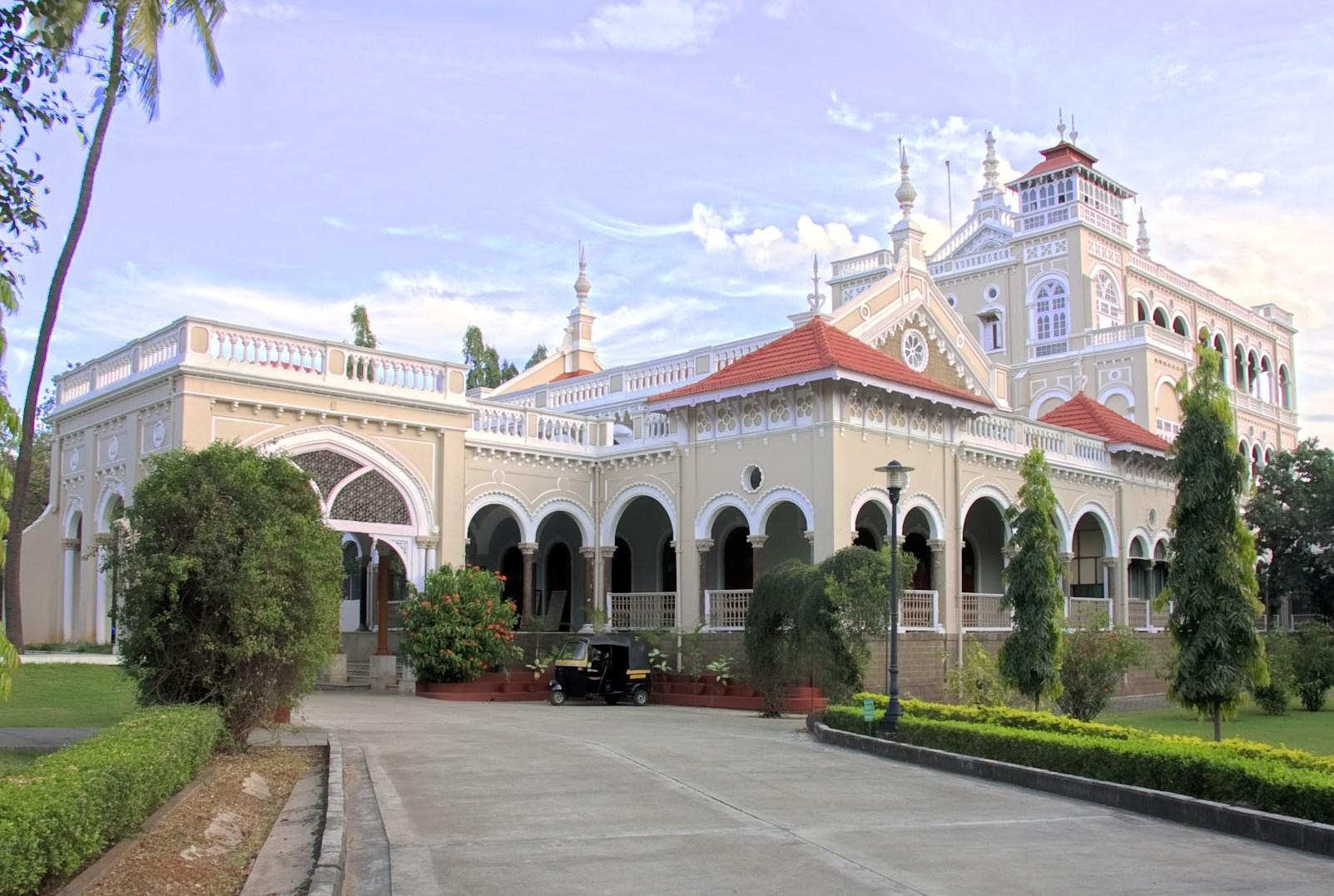
Aga Khan Palace.

Ranade was born on 26 October 1924, Poona, in the Bombay Presidency. The turning point in her life came in 1942, when she was 18, when she met Mahatma Gandhi at the Aga Khan Palace, in Poona, which resulted in the young Shobhana taking up Gandhian ideals for the rest of her life.

Ranade's life was devoted to the cause of destitute women and children. Her social career took a turn, in 1955, when she went to North Lakhimpur, Assam, joining a padyatra (walkathon) with Vinobha Bhave and helped setting up the Maitreyee Ashram and a Shishu Niketan, the first child welfare centre in the region. She also started the campaign, Adim Jaati Seva Sangh, a program for imparting training to Naga women on charkha weaving.

In 1979, she returned to Pune and helped founding the Gandhi National Memorial Society and an institute for women for training, based at Aga Khan Palace.

In 1998, Ranade, under the aegis of the Gandhi National Memorial Society, established the Kasturba Mahila Khadi Gramodyog Vidyalaya, an institute for destitute women, for training them in 20 village trades and skills.

She started an SOS children's village in Maharashtra, under the name, Balgram Maharashtra which has now grown to provide a home to 1600 orphans. The Hermann Gmeiner Social Centre, founded by Ranade and situated at Shivajinagar, Pune, is a children's home dedicated to the rehabilitation and education of street children, caring for 112 boys and 138 girls.

Another child welfare project was the Balgriha and Balsadan, established by Ranade at Saswad, in Pune. These centres now provide home to 60 destitute girls. Ranade was also involved with the Save Ganga Movement, drive to save River Ganges from pollution, through Gandhi National Memorial Society.

Ranade lived in Pune, taking care of her activities centred on Aga Khan Palace. She died on 4 August 2024, at the age of 99.

== Career positions held ==
- Trustee – Kasturba Gandhi National Memorial Trust (KGNMT)
- Trustee – Gandhi Smarak Nidhi
- Trustee – Balgram Maharashtra
- Secretary – Gandhi National Memorial Society
- Chairperson – All India Committee of Eradication of Illiteracy among Women (AICEIW)
- Board member – SOS Children's Villages – Delhi
- President – All India Women's Conference
- Chairperson – Bhoodan Gram Dan Board of Maharashtra

== Awards and honours ==
- Padma Bhushan – 2010
- Jamnalal Bajaj Award – 2011
- Reliance Foundation – CNN IBN Real Heroes 2012 Life Time Achievement Award
- Rabindranath Tagore Prize
- Rajeev Gandhi Manav Seva Award – 2007
- Pride of Pune Award – Pune University
- National Award for Child Welfare Work – 1983
- Mahatma Gandhi Award

== See also ==
- Gandhi Smarak Nidhi
