= National Ganga River Basin Authority =

Former authority in India

National Ganga River Basin Authority (NGRBA), was a financing, planning, implementing, monitoring and coordinating authority for the Ganges River, functioning under the Ministry of Jal Shakti, of India. The mission of the organisation is to safeguard the drainage basin which feeds water into the Ganges by protecting it from pollution or overuse.

In July 2014, the NGRBA was transferred from the Ministry of Environment and Forests to the Department of Water Resources, River Development & Ganga Rejuvenation, formerly the Ministry of Water Resources (India).

== Establishment ==
It was established by the Government of India, on 20 February 2009 under Section 3(3) of the Environment Protection Act, 1986, which also declared the Ganges as the "National River" of India.

== Overview ==
The Prime Minister is the chair of the Authority. Other members include the cabinet ministers of ministries that include the Ganges among their direct concerns and the chief ministers of states through which the Ganges River flows. The Chief Ministers as members are from the states through which Ganges flow viz. Uttarakhand, UP, Bihar, Jharkhand, West Bengal, among others.

The first meeting of the National Ganga River Basin Authority was held on 5 October 2009.

In the 2010 Union budget of India, the allocation for National Ganga River Basin Authority doubled to ₹500 crore (5,000,000,000.00).

== Members of the NGRBA ==
There are total of 23 members of the NGRBA. 14 out of 23 come from the government sectors whereas the remaining 9 come from the NGO sector.

=== Government members of the Committee ===
Members belonging to the government sector are as follows:

1. Prime Minister of India, chair
2. Minister of Environment and Forests (Union Minister)
3. Minister of Finance
4. Minister of Urban Development
5. Minister of Water Resources
6. Minister of Power
7. Minister of Sciences and Technology
8. Chief Minister of Uttarakhand
9. Chief Minister of Uttar Pradesh
10. Chief Minister of Bihar
11. Chief Minister of Jharkhand
12. Chief Minister of West Bengal
13. Ministry of Environment and Forests (state minister)
14. Ministry of Environment and Forests, secretary

=== Expert members of the committee ===
Members belonging to the NGO sector are as follows:

- Justice(Retd.) Giridhar Malviya, Patron, Ganga Mahasabha, Varanasi.
- Shri Mohan Singh Rawat Gaonwasi, Ex. Minister Uttarakhand.
- Shri M.A. Chitle, Maharashtra.
- Dr. Bhure lal, IAS (Retd.), Delhi
- Shri N.Vittal, Chennai

== Dissolution of Authority and establishment of National Ganga Council ==
The Government of India, in a notification issued on 20 September 2016, announced that it has taken the decision under the River Ganga (Rejuvenation, Protection and Management) Authorities Order, 2016 to establish a new body named the National Council for River Ganga (Rejuvenation, Protection and Management) (NCRG) or simply National Ganga Council (NGC) to replace the existing NGRBA.

The new body will act as an authority replacing the existing National Ganga River Basin Authority since 2016 for overall responsibility pollution prevention and rejuvenation of the Ganges Basin

=== National Ganga Council ===
NGC is chaired by the Prime Minister of India. NGC is responsible for preventing pollution and rejuvenating the Ganga River Basin. It also implements the National Mission for Clean Ganga. The NGC's jurisdiction includes the states of Uttar Pradesh, Bihar, West Bengal, Uttarakhand, Himachal Pradesh, and more.

The NGC works with the State Programme Management Groups (SPMGs) to implement projects. The SPMGs are the implementing arm of the State Ganga Committees.

The NGC also works with the National Mission for Clean Ganga (NMCG), which has a Governing Council and Executive Committee.

== See also ==
- Ministry of Jal Shakti
- Central Water Commission
- List of dams and reservoirs in India
- Indian rivers interlinking project
- Indian rivers interlinking project
- List of national projects of the Ministry of Water Resources of India
- List of rivers of India
- List of lakes of India
