= 2010 Union budget of India =

Government budget

2010 Union Budget of India
- Emblem of India
- Submitted: 26 February 2010
- Submitted by: Pranab Mukherjee
- Country: India
- Website: indiabudget.nic.in

The 2010 Union budget of India was presented by Finance minister Pranab Mukherjee in the Lok Sabha on Friday, February 26, 2010.

== Highlights ==
- The Indian economy was facing grave uncertainty. Growth had started decelerating when the interim and full budget for 2009-10 were presented.
- At home there was added uncertainty because of subnormal southwest monsoon.
- Yet, the economy now in a far better position than it was eight years ago.
- India weathered the economic crisis well and emerged from the global slowdown faster than any other country.
- First challenge before the government is to quickly revert to high GDP growth path of 9%.
- Expects 10% economic growth in the near future.
- Second challenge is to harness economic growth to make it more inclusive and consolidate gains.
- Third challenge is to overcome weakness in government's public delivery mechanism; a long way to go in this.
- Impressive recovery in the past few months. Can witness faster recovery in the coming months.
- Food security has been strengthened. But bottleneck of the public delivery mechanism can hold us back.
- Fiscal year 2009-10 was challenging for the economy.
- Focus shifted to non-governmental actors and an enabling government. Government now concentrates on supporting and delivering services to the poorer sections.
- Economy stabilised in the first quarter of 2009 itself.
- 18.5% manufacturing growth in December was the highest in two decades.
- Figures for merchandise exports for January encouraging after turnaround in November and December last year.
- Double digit food inflation last year due to bad monsoon and drought-like conditions.
- Government conscious of the price rise and taking steps to tackle it.
- Erratic monsoon and drought-like conditions forced supply-side bottleneck that fuelled inflation.
- Need to review stimulus imparted to economy last year to overcome the recession.
- Need to ensure that the demand-supply imbalance is managed.
- Need to make growth more broad-based.
- Need to review public spending and mobilise resources.
- Status paper on public debt within six months.
- Government hopes to implement direct tax code from April 2011.
- Earnest endeavour to implement general sales tax in April 2011.
- Government will raise ₹25,000 crore from divestment of its stake in state-owned firms.
- Kirit Parekh report on fuel price deregulation will be taken up by petroleum minister Murli Deora in due course.
- Nutrient-based fertiliser subsidy scheme to come into force from April 1 this year.
- Nutrient-based fertiliser subsidy will reduce volatility of subsidy and also reduce it.
- Market capitalisation of five public-sector undertakings listed since October increased by 3.5 times.
- FDI inflows steady during the year. Government has taken series of steps to simplify FDI regime. Intends to make FDI policy user friendly by compiling all guidelines into one document.
- Government has decided to set up apex-level Financial
- Stability and Development Council.
- RBI considering issuing banking licences to private companies. Non-banking finance companies will also be considered if they meet the criteria.
- Government to provide ₹16,500 crore to public-sector banks to maintain tier-I capital.
- Government to continue interest subvention of 2% for one more year for exports covering handicrafts, carpets, handlooms and small and medium enterprises.
- Government to provide ₹300 crore to organise 60,000 pulse and oilseed villages and provide integrated intervention of watershed and related programmes.
- ₹200 crore provided for climate-resilient agriculture initiative.
- Government committed to ensuring continued growth of special economic zones
- Need to take firm view on opening up of the retail sector.
- Deficit in foodgrains storage capacity to be met with private-sector participation.
- Period for repayment of loans by farmers extended by six months to June 30, 2010, in view of the drought and floods in some parts of the country.
- Interest subvention for timely repayment of crop loans raised from 1% to 2%, bringing the effective rate of interest to 5%.
- Road transport allocation raised by 13% to ₹19,894 crore.
- Proposal to maintain thrust of upgrading infrastructure in rural and urban areas. IIFCL authorised to refinance infrastructure projects.
- ₹1,73,552 crore provided for infrastructure development.
- Allocation for railways fixed at ₹16,752 crore, an increase of ₹950 crore over the last financial year.
- Government proposes to set up Coal Development Regulatory Authority.
- Mega power plant policy modified to lower cost of generation; allocation to power sector more than doubled to ₹5,130 crore in 2010-11.
- Government favours competitive bidding for coal blocks for captive power plants.
- ₹500 crore allocated for solar and hydro projects for the Ladakh region in Jammu & Kashmir.
- Clean Energy Fund to be created for research in new energy sources.
- Allocation for new and renewable energy ministry increased by 61% to ₹1,000 crore.
- One-time grant of ₹200 crore provided to Tirupur textile cluster in Tamil Nadu.
- Allocation for National Ganga River Basin Authority doubled to ₹500 crore.
- Alternative port to be developed at Sagar Island in West Bengal.
- Draft of Food Security Bill ready, to be placed in the public domain soon.
- Outlay for social sectors pegged at ₹1,37,674 crore, accounting for 37% of the total plan allocation.
- Plan allocation for school education raised from ₹26,800 crore to ₹31,036 crore in 2010-11.
- 25% of plan outlay earmarked for rural infrastructure development.
- Plan allocation for health and family welfare increased to ₹22,300 crore from ₹19,534 crore.
- For rural development, ₹66,100 crore have been allocated.
- Allocation for National Rural Employment Guarantee Authority stepped up to ₹40,100 crore in 2010-11.
- Indira Awas Yojana's unit cost raised to ₹45,000 in the plains and ₹48,500 in hilly areas.
- Allocation for urban development increased by 75% to ₹5,400 crore in 2010-11.
- 1% interest subvention loan for houses costing up to ₹20 lakh extended to March 31, 2011; ₹700 crore provided.
- Allocation for development of micro and small-scale sector raised from ₹1,794 crore to ₹2,400 crore.
- ₹1,270 crore provided for slum development programme, marking an increase of 700%.
- Government to set up National Social Security Fund with initial allocation of ₹1,000 crore to provide social security to workers in the unorganised sector.
- Government to contribute ₹1,000 per annum to each account holder under the new pension scheme.
- Exclusive skill development programme to be launched for textile and garment-sector employees.
- Allocation for woman and child development increased by 80%
- Plan outlay for the social justice ministry raised by 80% to ₹4,500 crore.
- Plan allocation for minority affairs ministry raised from ₹1,740 crore to ₹2,600 crore.
- Financial-Sector Legislative Reforms Committee to be set up.
- ₹1,900 crore allocated for Unique Identification Authority of India.
- A unique identity symbol will be provided to the rupee in line with the US dollar, British pound sterling, euro and Japanese yen.
- Defence allocation pegged at ₹1,47,344 crore in 2010-11 against ₹1,41,703 crore in the previous year. Of this, capital expenditure would account for ₹60,000 crore.
- Planning Commission to prepare integrated action plan for
- Naxal-affected areas to encourage "misguided elements" to eschew violence and join the mainstream.
- Gross tax receipts pegged at ₹7,46,656 crore for 2010-11, non-tax revenues at ₹1,48,118 crore.
- Total expenditure pegged at ₹11.8 lakh crore, an increase of 8.6%.
- Fiscal deficit at 5.5%.
- Fiscal deficit seen at 4.8% and 4.1% in 2011-12 and 2012–13, respectively.
- Non-plan expenditure pegged at ₹37,392 crore and plan expenditure at ₹7,35,657 crore in budget estimates. Proposed increase of 15% in plan expenditure and 6% in non-plan expenditure.
- Cash subsidy for fuel and fertiliser instead of previous practice of bonds to continue.
- Fiscal deficit pegged at 6.9% in 2009-10 as against 7.8% in the previous fiscal.
- Government's net borrowing to be ₹3,45,010 crore for 2010-11.
- Income-tax department ready with two-page Saral-2 returns form for individual salaried assesses.
- Personal income-ax rates pruned:
  - Income up to ₹1.6 lakh — nil
  - Income above ₹1.6 lakh and up to ₹5 lakh — 10%
  - Income above ₹5 lakh and up to ₹8 lakh — 20%
  - Income above ₹8 lakh — 30%
- Additional deduction of ₹20,000 allowed on long-term infrastructure bonds for income-tax payers; this is above ₹1 lakh on savings instruments allowed already.
- Investment-linked tax deductions to be allowed to two-star hotels anywhere in the country.
- Weighted deduction of 125% for payments to approved associations doing social and statistical research.
- One-time interim relief to housing and real-estate sector.
- Businesses with a turnover of up to ₹60 lakh and professionals earning up to ₹15 lakh to be exempted from the obligation to audit their accounts.
- Housing projects allowed to be completed in five years instead of four to avail of tax breaks.
- Revenue loss of ₹26,000 crore on direct tax proposals.
- Central excise duty on all non-petroleum products raised to 10% from 8%.
- FM increases customs duty on crude oil to 5%, on diesel and petrol to 7.5%, and on other petroleum products to 10%.
- Structural changes in excise duties on cigarettes, cigars, and cigarillos.
- Clean energy cess of ₹50 per ton to be levied on coal produced in India.
- Concessional excise duty of 4% on solar cycle rickshaws.
- Balloons exempted from central excise duty.
- Customs and central excise proposals to result in a net revenue gain of ₹43,500 crore.
- More services to be brought under the service tax net.
- Certain accredited news agencies exempted from payment of service tax.
- Net revenue gain from tax proposals pegged at ₹20,500 crore.

== See also ==
- Dream Budget
