= Ganges Barrage Project =

Proposed project in Bangladesh

Coordinates: 23.8743°N 89.4117°E

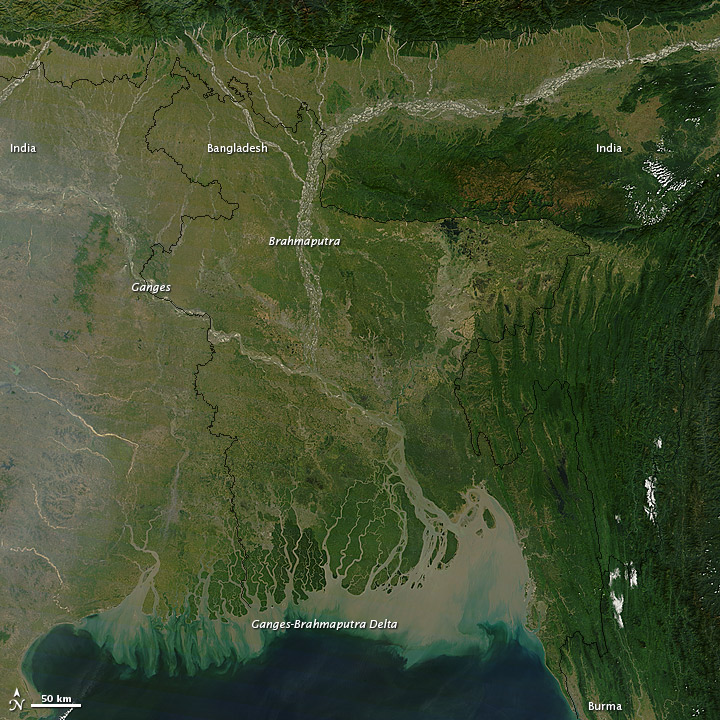
Ganges and Brahmaputra

The Ganges Barrage Project was a proposed project in Bangladesh to hold back rain water of the monsoon season because of the periodic drying up of the Ganges River in Bangladesh due to the Farakka Barrage. It was formally cancelled in 2017.

== Location and history ==
In 1963, Tippetts-Abbett-McCarthy-Stratton, a consulting firm from New York, proposed to the Pakistan government to construct a counter-barrage to hold water in the monsoon and supply it to the Gorai and other rivers in the lean period.

In 2013, a feasibility study commissioned by the Government of Bangladesh for a barrage in Pangsha Upazila in Rajbari District, Bangladesh was completed, after four years of work, at a cost of US$5 million (BDT 43 crore). Construction was to begin in 2014 and end in 2020.

On 10 April 2017, at the conclusion of meetings in Delhi, Sheikh Hasina, Prime Minister of Bangladesh and Narendra Modi, Prime Minister of India, confirmed their commitment to joint development of the Ganges Barrage, and to the visit of an Indian technical team to Bangladesh and the establishment of a Joint Technical Sub-Group on Ganges Barrage Project.

On 11 April, at a news conference in Dhaka, Prime Minister Sheikh Hasina characterized the feasibility study and project design for a barrage in Pangsha as 'completely flawed ... suicidal, like Teesta barrage was.' She accused water resources officials behind the plan of wanting to 'make profits from the project's funds.' She stated that she had instructed the water resources ministry to find alternative sites for storage of Ganges monsoon flows for utilization during the lean period, and that she had requested West Bengal chief minister Mamata Banerjee to look for sites there as well.

On 12 April, Minister of Water Resources Anisul Islam Mahmud announced that the government had abandoned the project and would explore alternative options for utilization of Ganges waters in Bangladesh. He said the barrage itself was not the issue, but rather its location and how it would be built.

== Cost of construction ==
The feasibility study estimated the cost of construction at approximately US$4 billion (BDT 31,414 crore). By April 2017, this had increased to US$5 billion.

== Reservoir ==
The reservoir as designed is over 100 km long, with a pond area of 625 km^{2} and capacity of 2890 million m^{3}. The pond level is 12.5 mPWD and the spillway sill level is 0.0 mPWD. When full the reservoir extends into Indian territory.

== Benefits ==
Benefits of a barrage at Pangsha were estimated to include about 100 megawatts of electricity and 250,000 metric tons of fish. Water could be brought into the reservoir from the Bramahaputra River by gravity or pumping. This in turn would allow transferred Bramhaputra water to be pumped into the Hoogly River to augment flows diverted through Farakka Barrage.

== See also ==
- Electricity sector in Bangladesh
- List of power stations in Bangladesh
- Pollution of the Ganges
- Sharing the water of the Ganges
