= Swami Jitendranand Saraswati =

Indian environmentalist

Swami Jeetendranand Saraswati
- Born: Acharya Jitendra; February 25, 1972 (age 54); Kushinagar, Uttar Pradesh
- Citizenship: Indian
- Education: Post Graduate
- Alma mater: Deen Dayal Upadhyay Gorakhpur University
- Occupation: Environmental Activist
- Known for: Save Ganga Crusader
- Title: General Secretary Akhil Bharatiya Sant Samiti
- Predecessor: Swami Devendranand Saraswati
- Website: https://gangamahasabha.in/

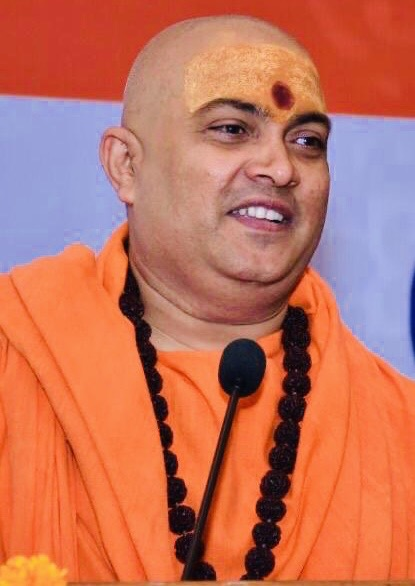
Dandi Swami Jeetendranand Saraswati

Swami Jeetendranand (born 25 Feb. 1972), also known as Acharya Jitendra, is a religious leader, monk, environmentalist activist. He is General Secretary of Akhil Bhartiya Sant Samiti. He is founder of Hind-Baloch forum (HBF is well-known voice for Baloch human rights in India). He has organised several seminar for Balochistan’s struggle throughout India. He is first religious petitioner against places of worship act 1991 in Supreme Court Of India.

Swami works for Ganga MahasabhaGanga Mahasabha since 2000. He is an environmental activist who convinced Mr. Lal Krishna Advani in 2008 to compel the Chief Minister B.C. Khanduri to abandon all state hydro-dam projects on the Ganga. He persuaded Professor Guru Das Agrawal G. D. Agrawal to give up his fast within 24 hours.

In 2010, Acharya Jitendra played a crucial role to stop the Loharinag Pala Hydel Project – On The Ganga. He approached senior Congress leaders for their support. When a favorable atmosphere was created, he met Pranab Mukherjee, leading a delegation of the Ganga Mahasabha. He then spoke to senior Vishva Hindu Parishad leader Ashok Singhal and the Bharatiya Janata Party's Rajnath Singh, who persuaded CM Ramesh Pokhriyal to write to the PM, asking him to scrap the Loharinag Pala project. He challenged Tehari Dam project. He wrote a letter to Bihar Chief Minister Nitish Kumar demanding to rename Bakhtiyarpur after Chankya or Shilbhadra
