= Loharinag Pala Hydropower Project =

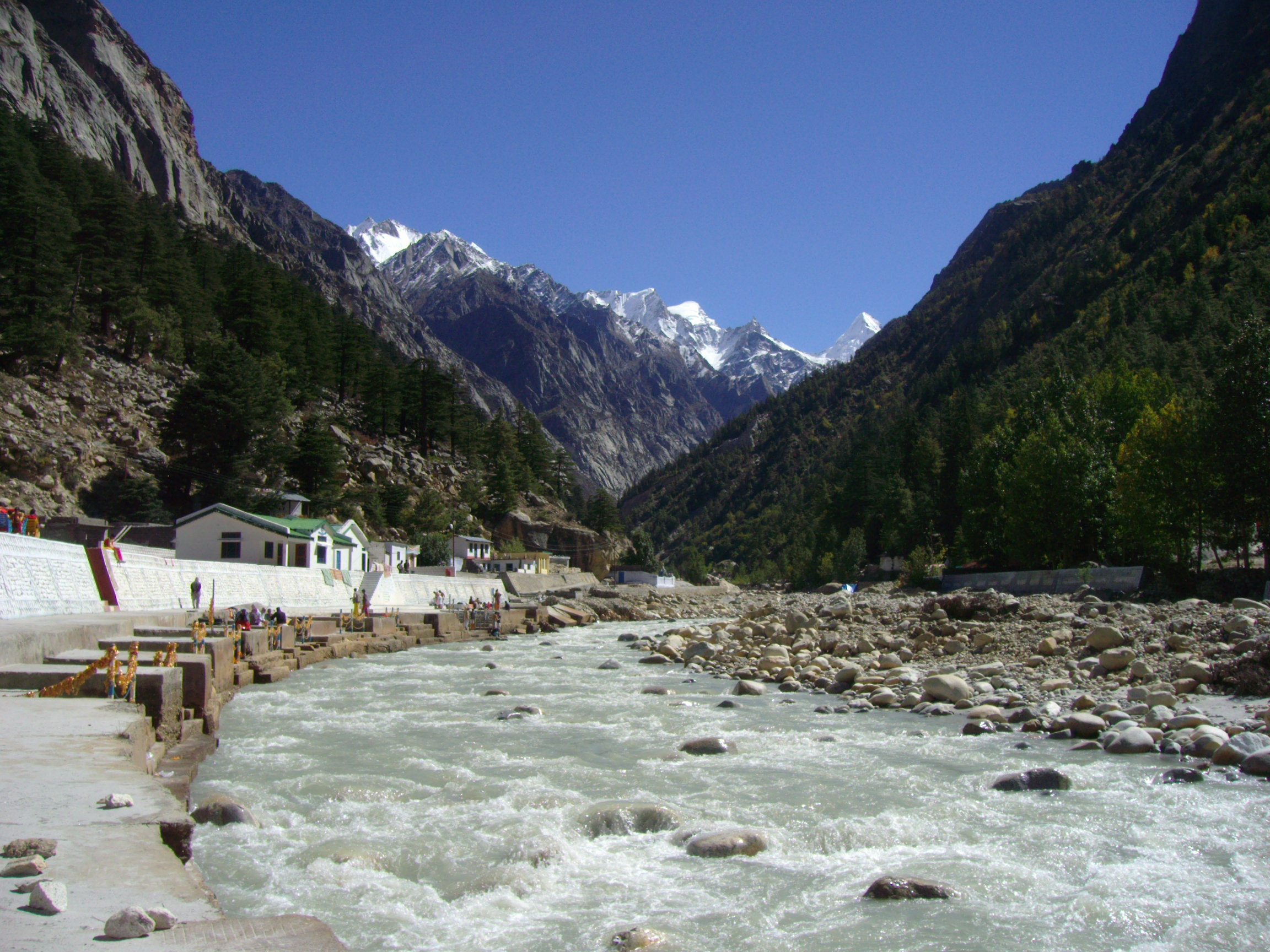
- The Bhagirathi river, the source stream of the Ganges River, in Gangotri, Uttarakhand, India

- Location within Uttarakhand
- Location: Uttarkashi Dt, Uttarakhand state, India (near Uttarkashi 18.7 km (11.6 mi) ExNE)
- Coordinates: 30°49′6″N 78°37′5″E
- Status: Discontinued
- Construction began: 19 February 2004
- Opening date: October 2011 est.
- Construction cost: Rs 28,951 million (US$ 658 million).

Dam and spillways
- Type of dam: Weir
- Impounds: Bhagirathi River
- Height: 15 m (49.2 ft)
- Length: 115 m (377.3 ft)
- Spillway type: 4 gates @ 13 m (43 ft) wide and 8.5 m (28 ft) high

Reservoir
- Total capacity: 190,320 cubic metres (6,721,000 cu ft)
- Catchment area: 3,316 km^{2} (1,280 sq mi)
- Surface area: 3 ha (0.0 km^{2})
- Maximum water depth: 8.5 m (27.9 ft)
- Normal elevation: 2,147.5 m (7,046 ft)

Power Station
- Operator: National Thermal Power Corporation
- Commission date: October 2011 est.
- Hydraulic head: 475.67 metres (1,560.6 ft)
- Turbines: four Pelton Turbines @ 150 MW
- Installed capacity: 600 MW
- Annual generation: 2,353.37 Gigawatt hours per year
- Website; III. LOHARINAG–PALA HYDROELECTRIC PROJECT 16
- Designer: Voith Hydro (E&M Package)

Loharinag Pala Hydropower Project is a run-of-the-river hydroelectricity generating project planned by the National Thermal Power Corporation (NTPC) Ltd to have an output capacity of 600 MW (150 MW x 4 Units). The project is located on the river Bhagirathi, the headstream of the Ganges River at Loharinag Pala, below the confluence of the Songad River, next to NH 34 in Uttarkashi District of Uttarakhand state, India. This is about 100 kilometres (62 mi) upstream of the Tehri Dam.

The main project construction contracts were awarded and construction started in 2006, however, work was stopped in 2009 after Professor G. D. Agrawal, one of India's eminent scientists, came close to dying on the 38th day of his fast in protest of the blocking the headwaters of the sacred River Ganges. Tarun Bharat Sangh, headed by Magsaysay award-winner, Rajendra Singh also played a pivotal role in stopping the project. The project was officially scrapped in 2010.

The Loharinag-Pala project was one of several hundred dams and barrages planned or now being constructed by India, in the southern foothills of the Himalayas. Together they are expected to provide 150,000 MW of electricity for areas in which power cuts are frequent and demand is growing fast.

== Description ==
The Hydroelectricity project had been envisaged for installation of 4 generating Units of 150 MW utilizing a hydraulic head of 476.5 metres (1,563 ft) to have a maximum capacity of 600 MW. The facilities would include 4 vertical shaft Pelton wheel turbines. The generators would be of synchronous vertical shaft type. The generators would have capacity at a lagging power factor of 0.90, 3 phase, 250 rpm, and rated voltage of 11 to 18 kV. The generator transformer would be 4 nos oil forced air forced (OFAF) type with step-up voltage capacity of 400 kV. The estimate of Greenhouse gases (GHG) abatement in tonnes CO_{2} equivalent is 5,268,027 t (Starting from 2010). Host Country Approval Status was Approved.

The Project Owner/Proponent was Mr. Piyush Pradhan, CDM Representative, Engineering Division, Project Engineering (Mech-CDM) (NTPC) Limited, NTPC Bhawan, Core-7; Scope Complex, 7-Institutional Area, Lodhi Road NTPC Bhawan, Scope Complex, New Delhi – 110003. The baseline methodology used for the project evaluation was ACM 0002: Consolidated methodology for grid-connected electricity generation from renewable sources – version 6; The latest version of the tool for demonstration and assessment of additionality (the additionality tool). The expected date for commissioning of the project was in the year 2010. Duration of the project activity is 21 years.

== Project land ==
For 16.455 hectares (41 acres) of private land, The District Magistrate (DM), Uttarkashi was instructed by The Government of Uttarakhand state to issue award in line to land acquisition (LA) Act. The Village Development Advisory Committee (VDAC) meeting was held on 08-05-2006 at Uttarkashi. f Award by the Special Land Acquisition Officer (SLAO) had been declared.

For reserve forest Civil Soyam land (total 139.029 hectares (344 acres)), the draft CAT Plan was submitted by District Forest Officer, Uttarkashi on 20-02-2006. Approval of the Catchment Area Treatment (CAT) Plan by GoUA was done.

For Forest Clearance, The Certificate for "Non Availability of Non-Forest Land for afforestation" was obtained by UPCL from Chief Secretary (UA). Certificate was submitted to Nodal Officer on 01-05-2006. Proposal has been cleared by Nodal Officer.

For township Land at Matli, private land needed was 11.383 hectares (28 acres) and government land needed was 1.835 ha. The revised proposal for Section IV was submitted in DM Office on 23-03-06. The Proposal was sent by DM, Uttarkashi to GoUA.now with discontinuation of the project by orders of India government the land acquisition is not being done.

For township land at Central Industrial Security Force (CISF) Colony at Kyark, private land needed was 9.979 hectares (25 acres) and government land needed was 1.436 hectares (4 acres). The proposal for Section IV was submitted in DM Office on 17-03-2006. The Proposal was sent to GoUA by DM, Uttarkashi but now not required as project has been discontinued by India government.

The project site starts from confluence of the Songad river on the Bhagirathi River in the Garhwal Himalaya to 18 kilometres (11 mi) down stream at Thirang gad confluence with Bhagirathi river. The barrage site is next to NH 108 at Loharinag Temple. The Project has a mountainous catchment area of 3,316 square kilometres (1,280 sq mi), of which 1,849 square kilometres (714 sq mi) (56%) is covered in snow or glacier. The source of the Bhagirathi is about 82 kilometres (51 mi) above the barrage.

== Construction of approach roads ==
For construction of approach road to Dabrani Adit (750 metres (2,460 ft) long ) private, forest and government land was needed. The LOA No. was LOA-54 dated 07-04-05 and the Deposit Work Agency was PWD, UA. Completion period was 6 months. The Date PWD Awarded the Work was 18-06-2005, Date of Start of Work was 01-08-2005 and the scheduled completion date was 31-01-2006. The formation width required was 10 m .

For construction of approach road to Gunaga Adit (4,000 metres (13,000 ft) long )Private, Forest and Govt land was needed. The LOA No. was LOA-32 dated 20-12-04 and Deposit Work Agency was PWD, UA. The completion period was 10 months and date PWD awarded the work was 28-02-2005. The date of start of Work was 16-07-2005, scheduled completion date was 16-05-2006, formation width Required was 10m.

For construction of approach road to Helgu Adit (6,000 metres (20,000 ft) long) private, forest and Govt land was needed. The LOA No. LOA-53 was dated 07-04-05. Deposit Work, Agency was PWD, UA. The completion period was 20 months, date PWD awarded the work was 18-06-2005, date of start of work was 19-01-2006, scheduled completion date was 18-09-2007. The formation required was 10 metres (33 ft). This road could not be completed due to geotechnical reason and alignment was require change but due to suspension of work forest land needed was not transferred. The formation width was 10 m.

For construction of approach road to surge shaft, a 6,810 metres (22,340 ft) long Bhukki -Kujjan road was to be constructed. LOA No. was LOA-09 dated 29-03-2004. The Deposit Work Agency was BRO. Completion period was 24 Months, date of start of work was 01-07-2005 and scheduled completion date was 30-06-2007. Formation width was 10 m. Private land/forest land was acquired to start the work.

== Construction of dam and powerhouse ==
For construction of three units, there were audits of 18-01-05 account, 17-03-05 account and 29-07-05 account, 13 months were awarded. For the Head Race Tunnel Package, on 18-04-05 account, 15-09-05 account and June 2006 account, there were 38 months. Evaluation was in progress. For underground power house and Penstock Package on 25-10-05 account, May 2006 account and Sept 2006, there was a schedule for 45 months. Bids were invited. For the electro-mechanical package April 2006 account, 09-06-06 and schedule Oct ’06, there was a schedule for 44 months. Bids were invited. For the hydro-mechanical package, Jan ’06, Account 31-05-06 Schedule Sep ’06, Schedule 40 months bids were invited. For construction of barrage and de-silting chamber 16-08-05, account 16-12-05. account June ’06 and anticipated 40 months, the evaluation was in progress.

== Commissioning ==
=== Old schedule ===
Commissioning dates scheduled were: UNIT #1 February ’2011, UNIT #2 March ’2011, UNIT #3 April ’2011 and UNIT #4 - May ’2011. At present the schedule has slipped to end the project somewhere in second quarter of 2013

=== Update ===
Work on the Loharinag Pala Hydropower Project was stopped after one of India's eminent scientists came close to dying on the 38th day of his fast in protest of the harnessing of the river Bhagirathi, a source stream of the Ganges River.

Professor G. D. Agrawal (b. 1932), former dean of the Indian Institute of Technology Kanpur, in the first week of March 2009 called off his second fast in a year against Himalayan dam projects, after the Indian government agreed to speed up its inquiry into how electricity could be generated without the flow of the Ganges being impeded. The free-running of the river is a crucial element of its sacred status.

Before his fast began in January, Agrawal said,: "The water ...(of the Ganges) is not ordinary water to a Hindu. It is a matter of the life and death of Hindu faith".

In August 2010, the Group of Ministers discontinued the project.

== Impact ==
Addition of 2,353.37 GWh of electricity generation to the Northern region grid would be the main measurable benefit of the Project. The average unit cost of electricity generated by the plant would be about Rs2.00 (US$0.0455) per kWh. The project appears to be economically viable under normal operating conditions. This table power supply is crucial for increased employment balanced growth in the area. The unit power cost from plants like the Loharinag–Pala HEP is less than the cost of private on site generation of electricity due to less-efficient technology and high fuel cost used of private off-grid generation.

The Environmental impact statement (EIS) prepared by the NTPC indicates the main adverse environmental impacts of the project will be changes in river hydrology, a decline in the quality of aquatic ecosystems, loss of agricultural and forest land, and resettlement. Impacts on the rivers will be mitigated by the release of a 0.85–1.1 m3/s minimum environmentally acceptable dry season flow from the Loharinag–Pala dam, the release of monsoon season flushing flows, and yearly restocking of rivers above and below the barrage sites with common snowtrout.

The loss of private agricultural and forest land has been or will be mitigated by the acquisition of private land at an above-market rate. The social impact of the projects will be mitigated by NTPC's resettlement and rehabilitation procedures, with fair compensation being paid by NTPC.

Also the owner of the project is not been fair on their contractual part as of not clearing the situation of uncertainty prevailing from so long duration to their contractors causing high stakes and risks at contractors end.
