= Pollution of the Ganges =

Diaspora of environmental pollution in Indian Ganges

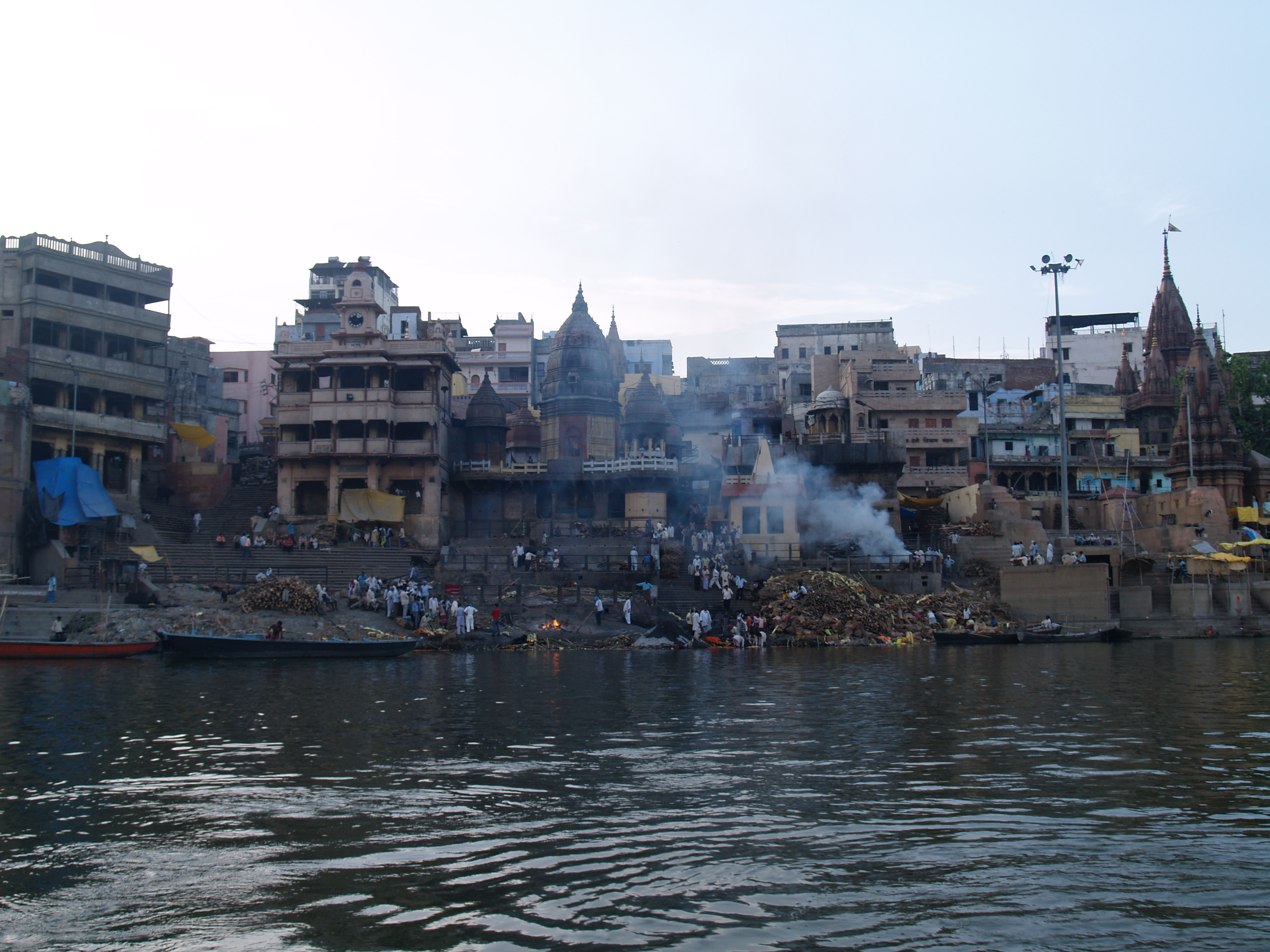
Funeral ghats in Varanasi

The ongoing pollution of the Ganges, the largest river in India, poses a significant threat to both human health and the environment. The river supplies water to approximately 40% of India's population across 11 states and serves an estimated 500 million people—more than any other river in the world.

Several initiatives have been undertaken to clean the river, but they have failed to produce significant results. After being elected, India's Prime Minister Narendra Modi pledged to work on cleaning the river and controlling pollution. Subsequently, in the June 2014 budget, the government announced the Namami Gange project. By 2016, an estimated ₹30 billion (US$460 million) had been spent on various efforts to clean up the river, with little success.

The proposed solutions include demolishing upstream dams to allow more water to flow into the river during the dry season, constructing new upstream dams or coastal reservoirs to provide dilution water during the dry season, and investing in substantial new infrastructure to treat sewage and industrial waste throughout the Ganges' catchment area.

Some suggested remedies, such as a coastal reservoir, would be very expensive and would involve significant pumping costs to dilute the pollution in the Ganges.

== Causes ==
The main causes of water pollution in the Ganges River are the disposal of human sewage and animal waste, increasing population density, and the discharge of industrial waste into the river.

=== Human waste ===
The river flows through 100 cities with populations exceeding 100,000 residents, 97 cities with populations between 50,000 and 100,000 residents, and about 48 towns. A large proportion of the sewage with a high organic load in the Ganges originates from domestic water usage by this population. Three-quarters of all the sewage generated in the northern plains remains completely untreated before being discharged into the Ganges and its tributaries. Even where effective sewage treatment plants have been provided, more than half are either not operating at all or not operating efficiently. A review in 2022 indicated that only 37% of the 72,368 million liters per day (ML/D) of sewage generated is treated.

=== Industrial waste ===
There are numerous industrial cities on the banks of the Ganges, such as Kanpur, Prayagraj, Varanasi, and Patna, along with tanneries, chemical plants, textile mills, distilleries, slaughterhouses, and hospitals. These cities and facilities actively contribute to the river's pollution by dumping untreated waste into it.

One coal-based power plant on the banks of the Pandu River, a Ganges tributary, burns 600,000 tons of coal each year and produces 210,000 tons of fly ash. The ash is dumped into ponds, where a slurry is filtered, mixed with domestic wastewater, and then released into the Pandu River. Fly ash contains toxic heavy metals such as lead and copper. The concentration of copper in the Pandu River, before it even reaches the Ganges, is a thousand times higher than in uncontaminated water.

Industrial effluents account for about 12% of the total volume of waste reaching the Ganges. Although this is a relatively low proportion, it is a major concern because these effluents are often toxic and non-biodegradable. Plastic and industrial waste, including wastewater from factories on the banks of the Ganges, are also significant sources of pollution. The most alarming issue facing the river is its increasing lack of water, which is being used for irrigation faster than it can be replenished.

=== Religious traditions ===
Owing to the sacred status of the river in Hinduism, over 70 million Hindu people bathe in the Ganges to cleanse themselves of their past sins, during festive seasons. Some materials, such as food, waste, and leaves, are left in the river, contributing to its pollution.

In the Hindu holy city of Varanasi alone, an estimated 40,000 bodies are cremated each year and deposited into the Ganges. Because many families cannot afford the high cost of sufficient quantities of cremation wood, many of the bodies placed in the river are only half-burnt.

== Dams and pumping stations ==
Built in 1854 during British rule in India, the Haridwar Dam has contributed to the decay of the Ganges by significantly reducing the river's flow. The Farakka Barrage was initially constructed to divert fresh water into the Hooghly River but has since increased salinity in the Ganges, adversely affecting groundwater and soil along the river. The barrage has caused major tension between Bangladesh and India, with Bangladesh actively considering the construction of the Ganges Barrage Project to address the salinity issue. Despite a government-commissioned green panel report recommending the cancellation of 34 proposed dams due to environmental concerns, the Indian government plans to construct about 300 dams on the Ganges and its tributaries in the near future.

Three additional dams across the Ganges River are located at Bijnor, Narora, and Kanpur. The dams at Bijnor and Narora divert all the water, including base flows during the dry season, to canals for irrigating areas up to Allahabad city. Flow upstream of the Kanpur barrage is used during the dry season for the drinking water supply of cities. Downstream of the Kanpur dam, adequate water volumes are unavailable during the dry seasons of the year.

Several pumping stations are located on the banks of the Ganges downstream of the Kanpur barrage, serving the region's irrigation needs.

These large pump houses are situated at the following coordinates:

- Rukunpur: 26°10′21″N 80°38′57″E
- Kanjauli Kachhar: 25°17′37″N 82°13′15″E
- Hakanipur Kalan: 25°12′57″N 83°01′15″E
- Bhosawali: 25°20′46″N 83°10′11″E
- Shekpur: 25°32′13″N 83°11′57″E
- Chochakpur: 25°28′55″N 83°25′11″E
- Lamui: 25°23′20″N 83°32′11″E
- Chausa: 25°31′11″N 83°54′04″E

These irrigation facilities pump out most of the base flows from the main river downstream of Kanpur city.

To keep the Ganges flowing and dilute polluted water inflows from habitations and industries, a minimum environmental flow of at least 5,000 cusecs is required from Narora to Farakka during the eight-month-long dry season. This could be achieved by constructing storage reservoirs with a capacity of 100 Tmcft across the Ganges' tributaries upstream of Narora city and reserving the stored water solely for minimum environmental flows.

Additionally, a series of cascading dam bridges should be constructed across the river from Kanpur to Allahabad to increase the surface area of impounded polluted water and serve as natural oxidation ponds. The goal is for the accumulated pollutants to be washed away during the annual monsoon floods. Several dams are already planned between Farakka and Allahabad as part of the National Waterway 1 project, which aims to make the 1,620 km stretch of the river navigable from Haldia to Allahabad and could potentially be extended up to Kanpur.

== Statistics ==
A 2006 measurement of pollution in the Ganges revealed that river water monitoring over the previous 12 years had shown fecal coliform counts of up to 100,000,000 MPN per 100 mL and biological oxygen demand levels averaging over 40 mg/L in the most polluted part of the river at Varanasi. The overall rate of water-borne disease incidence, including acute gastrointestinal diseases, was estimated to be about 66%.

A systematic classification by the Uttarakhand Environment Protection and Pollution Control Board (UEPPCB) categorized river waters into four categories: A (safe for drinking), B (safe for bathing), C (safe for agriculture), and D (excessive pollution). The Ganges was classified in category D. Coliform bacteria levels in the Ganges have also been tested at 5,500 MPN per 100 mL, a level too high to be considered safe for agricultural use, let alone for drinking or bathing.

The leather industry in Kanpur, which employs around 50,000 people in more than 400 tanneries, uses chemicals such as toxic chromium compounds. Despite the establishment of a common treatment plant in 1995, chromium levels in the Ganges have not decreased and now exceed the recommended maximum level by more than 70 times.

A study conducted by the National Cancer Registry Program (NCRP) under the Indian Council of Medical Research in 2012 suggested that "those living along its banks in Uttar Pradesh, Bihar, and Bengal are more prone to cancer than anywhere else in the country."

In 2020, a study showed that the levels of toxic heavy metals in the Ganges had significantly improved in recent years. This study was supported by the Indo-US Science and Technology Forum (IUSSTF).

== Effects ==
=== Marine life ===
The results of mercury analysis in various specimens collected along the basin indicated that some fish muscles accumulated high levels of mercury, with approximately 50-84% of it being organic mercury. A strong positive correlation was found between mercury levels in muscle tissue and both food habits and fish length.

The Ganges river dolphin is one of the few species of freshwater dolphins in the world. Listed as endangered, its population is believed to be less than 2,000. Hydroelectric and irrigation dams along the Ganges, which prevent the dolphins from traveling up and down the river, are considered the main reason for their declining numbers.

The Ganges softshell turtle (Nilssonia gangetica) is found in the Ganges, Indus, and Mahanadi river systems of Pakistan, India, Bangladesh, and Nepal. This turtle inhabits deep rivers, streams, large canals, lakes, and ponds with beds of mud or sand. According to the International Union for Conservation of Nature, this turtle species is vulnerable. Due to their long lifespan and high trophic level in the aquatic food web, these turtles are particularly susceptible to heavy metal pollution, a major issue in the Ganges.

=== Wildlife ===
Some of the dams being constructed along the Ganges basin will submerge substantial areas of nearby forest. For example, the Kotli-Bhel dam at Devprayag will submerge 1,200 hectares of forest, destroying the forest ecosystem and its wildlife.

=== Humans ===
An analysis of Ganges water in 2006 and 2007 revealed significant associations between water-borne diseases and the use of the river for bathing, laundry, washing, eating, cleaning utensils, and brushing teeth. Water from the Ganges has been linked to dysentery, cholera, hepatitis, and severe diarrhea, which remains one of the leading causes of death among children in India.

During the summer and monsoon, hospital wards teem with children who need treatment for waterborne diseases - but according to S.C. Singh, a paediatrician at Varanasi Shiv Prasad Gupta Hospital, their parents rarely mention that they have been swimming in the river. They don't appear to have made the connection, he says.

== Cleanup efforts ==
=== Ganga Mahasabha ===
The Ganga Mahasabha is an Indian organization dedicated to the Ganges, founded by Madan Mohan Malaviya in 1905. After a long struggle, British India agreed on 5 November 1914 to the Ganga Mahasabha's request, recognizing that the uninterrupted flow of the Ganges is a fundamental right of Hindus. This day is known as "Aviral Ganga Samjhauta Divas" (Uninterrupted Ganga Flow Agreement Day) in Indian history. The agreement, known as the Agreement of 1916, came into effect on 19 December 1916. Despite its legal validity, the sanctity of the agreement has not been upheld by the state and central governments of India after independence. Increasingly, river water is diverted for irrigation use, exacerbating pollution and strain on the river.

=== Ganga Action Plan ===
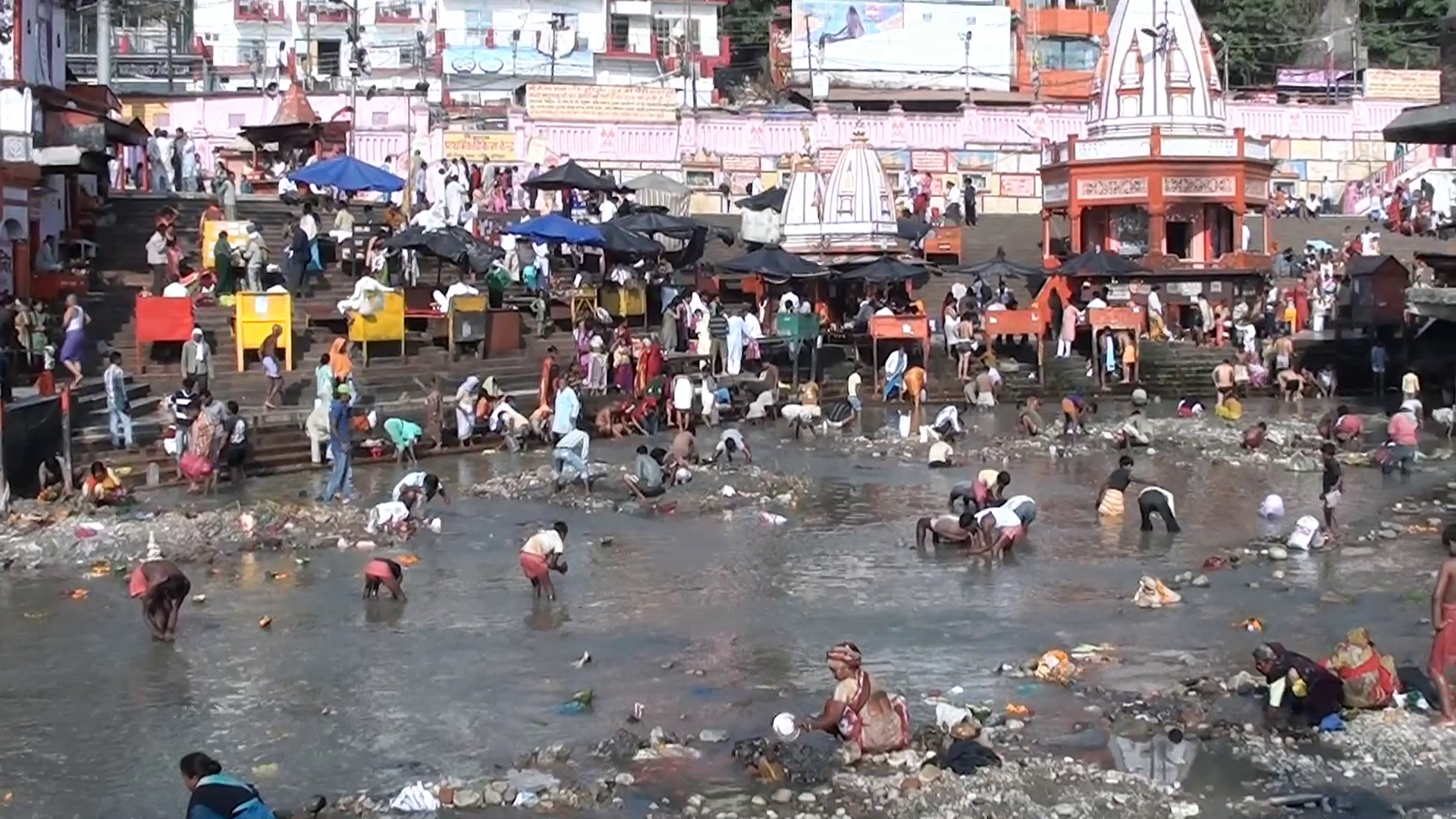
Ganges canal dried for cleaning

The Ganga Action Plan (GAP) was launched by Rajiv Gandhi, then Prime Minister of India, in June 1985. It covered 25 Class I towns (6 in Uttar Pradesh, 4 in Bihar, and 15 in West Bengal), with ₹862.59 crore spent. The main objective was to improve water quality through the interception, diversion, and treatment of domestic sewage and to prevent toxic and industrial chemical wastes from identified polluting units from entering the river. The other objectives of the GAP are as follows:

- Control of non-point source pollution from human defecation, cattle wallowing, and the disposal of human remains in the river.
- Research and development to conserve the biotic diversity of the river and enhance its productivity.
- Development of sewage treatment technologies, such as Up-flow Anaerobic Sludge Blanket (UASB), and sewage treatment through afforestation.
- Rehabilitation of soft-shelled turtles to aid in pollution abatement.
- Resource recovery options, such as methane production for energy generation and the use of aquaculture for revenue generation.
- To serve as a model for similar action plans in other heavily polluted stretches of rivers.
- The ultimate objective of the GAP is to adopt an integrated river basin management approach, considering the various dynamic interactions between abiotic and biotic ecosystems.

Despite some delays in completing the first phase of the GAP, it has generated considerable interest and laid the groundwork for developing a national approach to replicating this program for other polluted rivers in the country. The Government of India proposed to extend this model with suitable modifications at the national level through the National River Action Plan (NRAP). The NRAP draws on the lessons learned and experiences gained from the GAP, as well as seeking input from State Governments and other concerned Departments and Agencies. Under the NRCP scheme, the CPCB conducted river basin studies and identified 19 polluted stretches and 14 less polluted stretches along 19 rivers, including 11 stretches along 7 rivers in Madhya Pradesh.

Phase II covered 59 towns across five states, with more than ₹5.053 billion spent. Rivers such as the Yamuna, Gomti, Damodar, and Mahananda had separate action plans.

=== National Ganga River Basin Authority (NGRBA) ===
The National Ganges River Basin Authority (NGRBA) was established by the Central Government of India on 20 February 2009 under Section 3 of the Environment Protection Act, 1986. It declared the Ganges as the "National River" of India. The chair of the NGRBA includes the Prime Minister of India and the chief ministers of the states through which the Ganges flows. In 2011, the World Bank approved $1 billion in funding for the NGRBA.

=== 2010 Government clean-up campaign ===
In 2010, it was announced that "the Indian government has embarked on a $4 billion campaign to ensure that by 2020 no untreated municipal sewage or industrial runoff enters the 1,560-mile river." A World Bank spokesman described the plan in 2011, saying:

Earlier efforts to clean the Ganges concentrated on a few highly polluting towns and centres and addressed 'end-of-the-pipe' wastewater treatment there; Mission Clean Ganga builds on lessons from the past, and will look at the entire Gangetic basin while planning and prioritising investment instead of the earlier town-centric approach.

The lobby group Sankat Mochan Foundation (SMF) "is working with GO2 Water Inc., a Berkeley, California-based wastewater technology company," to design a new sewage treatment system for Varanasi.

The Supreme Court of India has been working on the closure and relocation of many industrial plants, such as Tulsi, along the Ganges. In 2010, the government declared the stretch of river between Gaumukh and Uttarkashi an eco-sensitive zone.

=== Namami Gange Programme ===
In the budget presented in Parliament on 10 July 2014, Union Finance Minister Arun Jaitley announced an integrated Ganges development project titled "Namami Gange" (meaning 'Obeisance to the Ganges River') and allocated ₹2,037 crore for this purpose. The objectives were the effective abatement of pollution, conservation, and rejuvenation of the Ganges. The project covers 8 states. The Ministry of Drinking Water Supply and Sanitation proposed to make 1,674 gram panchayats along the Ganges open defecation-free, at a cost of ₹1,700 crore (central share). An estimated ₹2,958 crore (US$460 million) had been spent by July 2016 on various efforts to clean up the river.

As part of the program, the Government of India ordered the shutdown of 48 industrial units around the Ganges.

The program had a budget outlay of ₹20,000 crore for the next five years, marking a significant five-fold increase over the expenditure of the past 30 years (the Government of India incurred approximately ₹4,000 crore on this task since 1985). The central government will now cover 100% of the funding for various projects under this program. Learning from the unsatisfactory results of earlier Ganges Action Plans, the central government plans to provide operation and maintenance assets for a minimum of 10 years and adopt a Public-Private Partnership (PPP) or Special Purpose Vehicle (SPV) approach for addressing pollution hotspots.

In an attempt to bolster enforcement, the central government also plans to establish a four-battalion Ganges Eco-Task Force. The program emphasizes improved coordination mechanisms between various ministries and agencies of the central and state governments. It includes major infrastructure investments that fall under the original mandates of other ministries. Additionally, Urban Development (UD), Drinking Water & Sanitation (DWS), and Environment, Forests & Climate Change (EF&CC) will also be involved in the program.

"Namami Gange" will focus on pollution abatement interventions, primarily through the interception, diversion, and treatment of wastewater flowing through open drains. The program will employ bio-remediation, appropriate in-situ treatment, innovative technologies, sewage treatment plants (STPs), and effluent treatment plants (ETPs). It aims to rehabilitate and augment existing STPs and implement immediate short-term measures to prevent pollution at river exit points and prevent the inflow of sewage.

Significantly, the approach is notable for the socio-economic benefits it is expected to deliver, including job creation, improved quality of life, and health benefits for the vast population that depends on the river.

The main pillars of Namami Gange Programme are:

1. Sewerage Treatment Infrastructure
2. River-Front Development
3. River-Surface Cleaning
4. Bio-Diversity
5. Afforestation
6. Public Awareness
7. Industrial Effluent Monitoring
8. Ganga Gram

=== Namami Gange Mission-II ===
With the success of the Namami Gange Programme, the Government of India allocated ₹22,500 crore for Namami Gange Mission-II, which aims to provide further maintenance of the Ganges, with funds allocated until 2026. From FY 2014–15 through 31 January 2023, the government provided the National Mission for Clean Ganga (NMCG) with a total of ₹14,084.72 crore. Of that amount, the NMCG has allocated ₹13,607.18 crore to state governments, state missions for cleaning the Ganges, and other organizations for the implementation of projects related to the rejuvenation of the river.

=== Ganga Manthan ===
Ganga Manthan was a national conference held to discuss issues and possible solutions for cleaning the river.

The conference aimed to gather feedback from stakeholders and prepare a roadmap for rejuvenating the Ganges. The event was organized by the National Mission for Clean Ganga (NMCG) on 7 July 2014 at Vigyan Bhawan in New Delhi.

==== Nepal to release water during lean flow period ====
Nepal has constructed many barrages (excluding joint projects with India) and pump houses to divert river flows during the lean season for irrigation purposes. These water diversion projects are located near the following coordinates: 28°25′29″N 81°22′49″E, 28°02′24″N 81°57′12″E, 27°52′51″N 82°30′13″E, 27°40′00″N 83°06′49″E, 27°42′17″N 84°25′57″E, 27°08′11″N 85°29′01″E, 26°53′09″N 86°08′13″E, 26°50′13″N 87°09′01″E, and 26°41′05″N 87°52′43″E. As a lower riparian state, India has the right to claim a share of the river water flows from Nepal, similar to the river water sharing agreements India has with Bangladesh, which recognizes Bangladesh as a lower riparian state. Currently, there is no bilateral agreement between India and Nepal for equitable sharing of river waters during the lean season. When Nepal releases water into India during this period, it would help in cleaning and diluting the polluted waters of the downstream Ganges River up to the Farakka Barrage.

==== Water diversion from Manasarovar lake ====
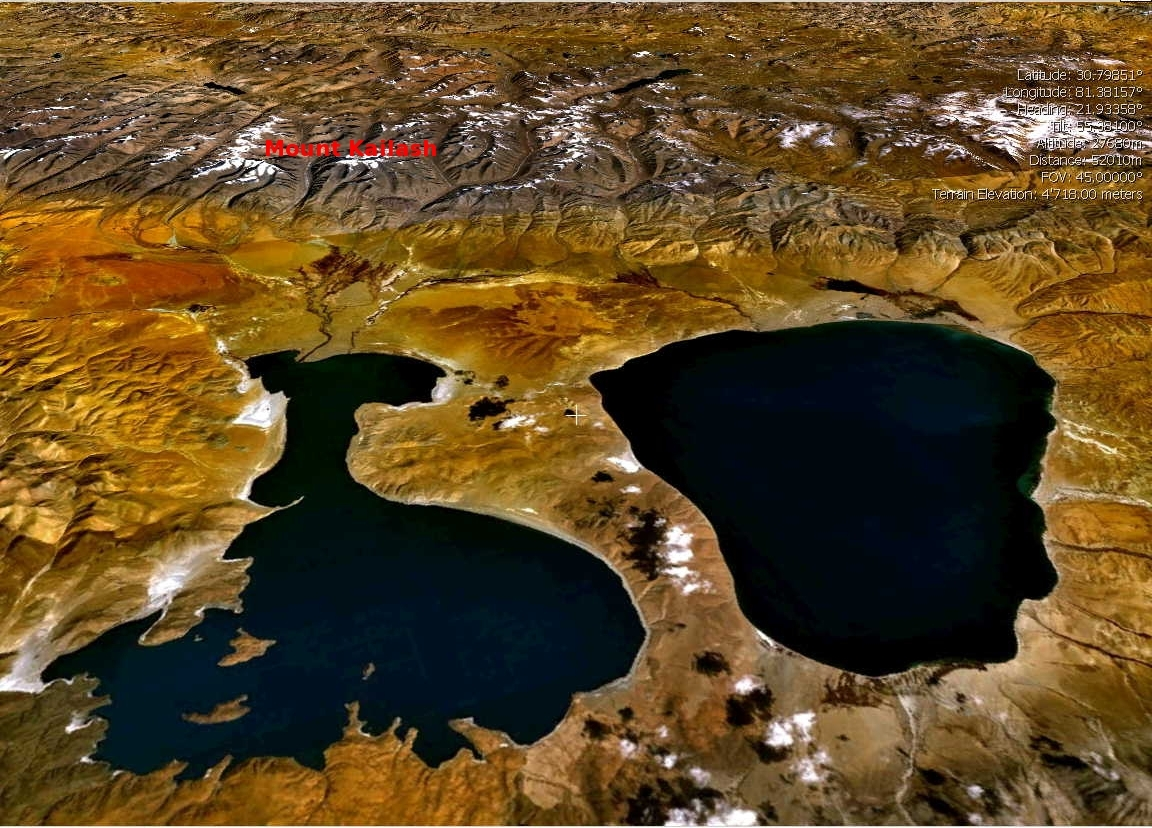
A satellite view of the Manasarovar (right) and Rakshastal lakes with Mount Kailash in the background

Restoring the minimum environmental flows is challenging due to the difficulty of identifying nearly 100 Tmcft of storage reservoirs in the hilly region of the Ganges basin in India, as the river flows through steep valleys. Large storage reservoirs like Tehri and Ramganga have already been constructed at feasible locations. However, water from Manasarovar Lake could be diverted to the Mabja Zangbo River, a tributary of the Karnali River in China, to reach upstream of the Kanpur Barrage (117 m msl) via Girijapur Barrage (129 m msl) located at 28°16′21″N 81°05′09″E across the Ghaghara/Karnali River, which is a tributary of the Ganges flowing from Tibet and Nepal.

Manasarovar Lake has a surface area of 320 square kilometres (120 sq mi) and a maximum depth of 90 m (300 ft). It holds more than 100 Tmcft of water in its top 13 meters. Currently, it overflows into the nearby Lake Rakshastal, a landlocked saltwater endorheic lake. The annual water inflows from the catchment area of Manasarovar Lake, located at 4,590 metres (15,060 ft) above mean sea level, can be diverted by gravity to the Karnali River basin in China through a 15-kilometer long tunnel.

The continuously diverted water can be used in China for hydroelectric power generation, where the available head drop exceeds 800 meters over a 40-kilometer stretch. This would be a joint project involving China, Nepal, and India to control river water pollution and ensure the Ganges flows throughout the year. With the diversion of water from Manasarovar Lake to the Ganges basin, Lake Rakshastal would become a soda lake with increased water salinity, which could be useful for extracting water-soluble chemicals on a commercial scale.

The freshwater inflows into Manasarovar Lake can be significantly increased by gravity diversion from the major catchment area of Rakshastal Lake. This can be achieved by constructing an earth dam at the northern tip of Rakshastal Lake, which is fed by its substantial catchment area and is also connected to Manasarovar Lake.

==== Utilisation of Ganges and Brahmaputra flood waters to fight pollution in all rivers of India ====
A proposal in 2018 suggested creating a very large freshwater coastal reservoir in the shallow sea area adjoining the West Bengal, Odisha, and Bangladesh coast by constructing sea dikes, bunds, or causeways up to a depth of 20 meters. However, this proposal has not been pursued.

== Clean Ganga Fund ==
The Union Cabinet approved the establishment of the Clean Ganga Fund in September 2014, with the aim of using the collected funds for various activities under the Namami Gange program for cleaning the Ganges.

Funds are used to:

- Clean up the Ganges
- Set up waste treatment plants
- Conserve biotic diversity of the river
- Develop public amenities
- Activities such as ghat redevelopment, research and development, and innovative projects

=== National Mission for Clean Ganga ===
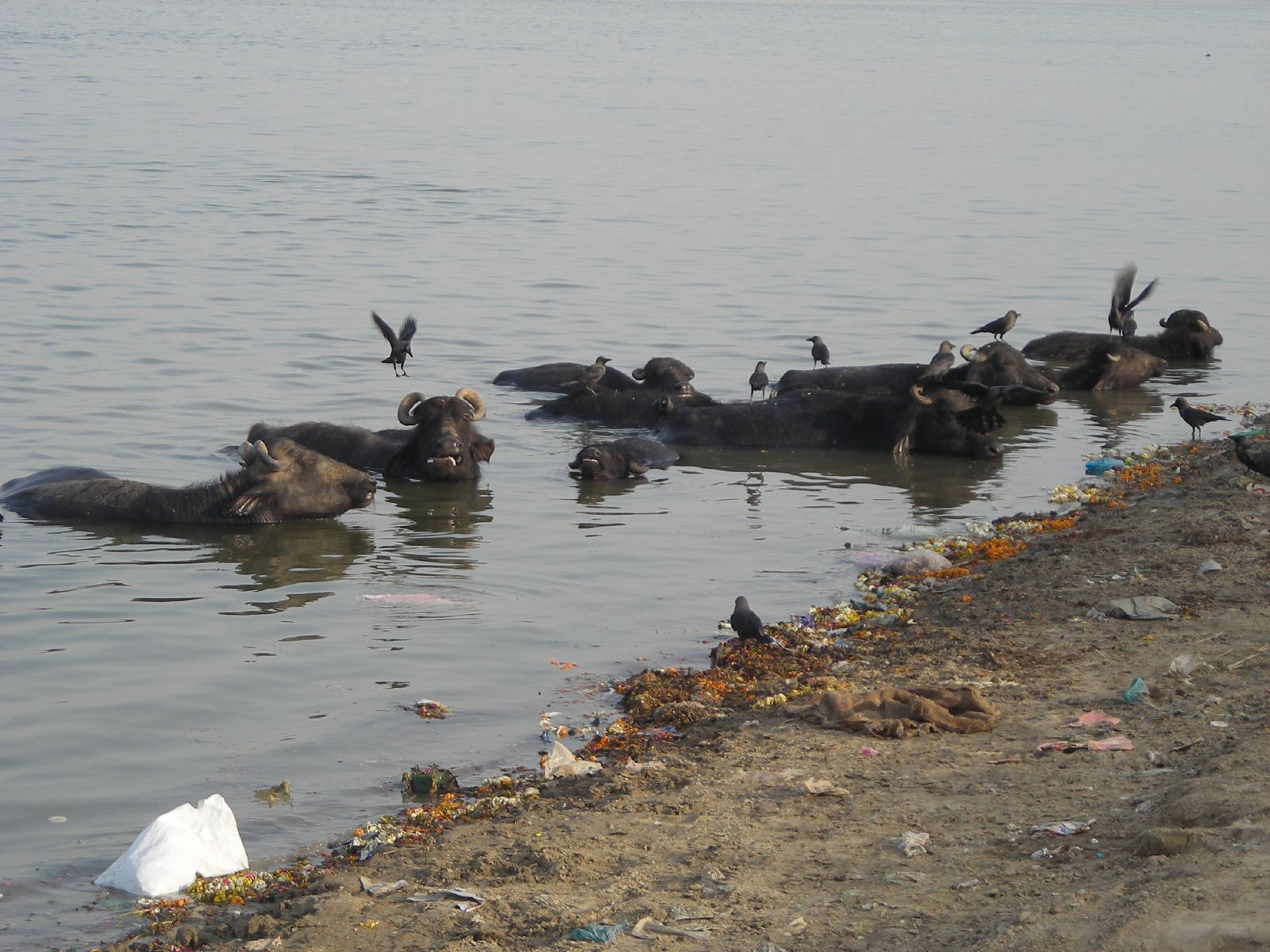
Pollution in the Ganges

The National Mission for Clean Ganga (NMCG) is the implementation wing of the National Ganga Council, which was established in October 2016 under the River Ganga (Rejuvenation, Protection, and Management) Authorities Order 2016. This order dissolved the National Ganga River Basin Authority. The aim is to clean the Ganges and its tributaries in a comprehensive manner. Gajendra Singh Shekhawat is the current Union Cabinet Minister in the Ministry of Jal Shakti. As of 2025, the mission is facing tax demands from the Income Tax (I-T) Department amounting to Rs 243.74 crore and is in the process of filing appeals.

==== Namami Gange Programme ====
Under the National Mission for Clean Ganga, the Namami Gange Programme was launched in 2014 as a flagship initiative of the Union Government. A budget of ₹20,000 crore was allocated with the objectives of effective pollution abatement, conservation, and rejuvenation of the Ganges. After several years of efforts under the programme, government agencies and the news media reported detectable improvement in water quality at some locations, but that water quality generally remained unfit for bathing due to high levels of fecal bacteria.

== Protests in favor of cleaning the Ganges ==
=== Nigamanand ===
In early 2011, a Hindu monk named Swami Nigamananda Saraswati fasted to death, protesting against the pollutive riverbed quarrying of the Ganges in the district of Haridwar, Uttarakhand. Following his death in June 2011, his ashram leader, Swami Shivananda, fasted for 11 days starting on 25 November 2011 to continue the movement. On 5 December 2011, the Government of Uttarakhand issued an order to ban riverbed mining in the Bhogpur and Bishanpur ghats. According to administration officials, quarrying in the Ganges will now be studied by a special committee, which will assess its environmental impacts on the river and surrounding areas.

=== G. D. Agrawal ===
G. D. Agrawal was an environmental activist and patron of Ganga Mahasabha, an organization founded by Madan Mohan Malviya in 1905, which demanded the removal of dams on the Ganges. With support from other social activists like Anna Hazare, the then-Prime Minister of India, Manmohan Singh, agreed to Agrawal's demands. Consequently, he called for a National River Ganga Basin Authority (NRGBA) meeting and urged the authorities to utilize the ₹26 billion (US$520M) sanctioned "for creating sewer networks, sewage treatment plants, sewage pumping stations, electric crematoria, community toilets, and development of riverfronts." Agrawal died on 11 October 2018, after being on an indefinite fast since 22 June 2018, demanding that the government act on its promises to clean and save the Ganges.

== Denial ==
After the National Green Tribunal released a report stating that the amount of fecal coliform bacteria in the water of the Ganges at Prayagraj during the 2025 Kumbh Mela was 1,400 times above the permissible limit, Uttar Pradesh Chief Minister Yogi Adityanath denied that the Ganges was polluted, stating that its water was "clean enough to consume." He dismissed the report as an attempt to malign the event.

== See also ==
- Yamuna
- Yamuna Action Plan
- Water pollution in India
- Farakka Barrage
- Indian Rivers Inter-link
- Kalpasar Project
- Land reclamation
- Water export
- Electricity sector in India#Solar power
- Ganges Barrage Project
- Geography of Bangladesh
- Geography of Nepal
- List of most-polluted rivers
