= G. D. Agrawal =

Indian environmentalist (1932–2018)

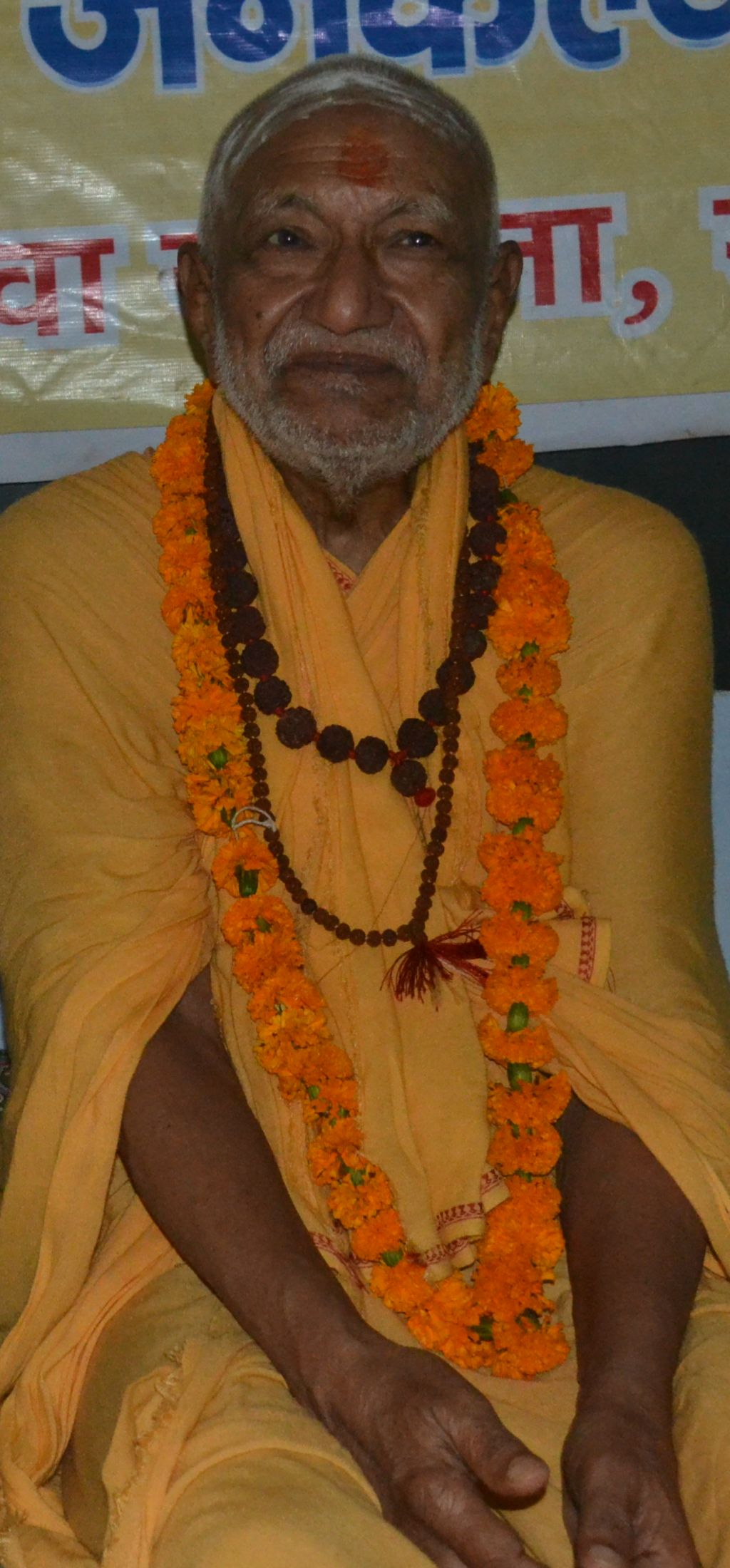
- G. D. Agrawal
- Born: Guru Das Agrawal; 20 July 1932; Kandhla, Muzaffarnagar district, United Provinces, British Raj (present-day Uttar Pradesh, India)
- Died: 11 October 2018 (aged 86); All India Institute of Medical Sciences, Rishikesh, Uttarakhand, India
- Cause of death: Fast-unto-death
- Resting place: Chitrakoot, Madhya Pradesh, India
- Other names: Sant Swami Sanand, Swami Gyan Swaroop Sanand
- Citizenship: Indian
- Education: Benaras Hindu University; IIT Roorkee; University of California at Berkeley
- Occupation: Environmental engineer
- Employer(s): Government of India Central Pollution Control Board, civil and environmental engineering at IIT Kanpur
- Known for: Campaign to stop dam construction on the Bhagirathi River in 2009
- Title: First Member-Secretary (CPCB), former Head of the Department (IIT)
- Term: 17 years at IIT Kanpur

Guru Das Agrawal, (20 July 1932 – 11 October 2018), was an Indian environmentalist, engineer, religious leader, monk, and professor. He was the patron of Ganga Mahasabha, founded by Madan Mohan Malviya in 1905.

He is notable for several fasts undertaken to stop many projects on the River Ganga. His fast in 2009 led to the damming of the Bhagirathi River being stopped.

Agrawal died on 11 October 2018, after fasting since 22 June 2018, demanding the government act on its promises to clean and save the Ganga.

== Early life ==
Born to a farming family in Kandhla, Muzaffarnagar district, Uttar Pradesh, in 1932, he studied in local primary and secondary schools. He graduated in civil engineering from the University of Roorkee (now IIT Roorkee). While he was the member secretary of the Central Pollution Control Board during 1979–1980, he was also a visiting professor for environmental engineering at the University of Roorkee.

In July 2011, he became a Hindu sannyasi and Swami Gyanswaroop Sanand.

== Environmental activism ==
=== Background ===
Despite numerous protests and representations by local citizens, 6 hydroelectric power-plant dams were planned, seeking clearance or already under construction, on a 125 kilometres (78 mi) stretch of the Bhagirathi River's 2,525 kilometres (1,569 mi) length. This run is from the river's source at the Gangotri Glacier to the remote town of Uttarkashi in the Himalayan foothills. As part of its plan for economic growth, the Indian government pushed forward hydroelectric projects on the river.

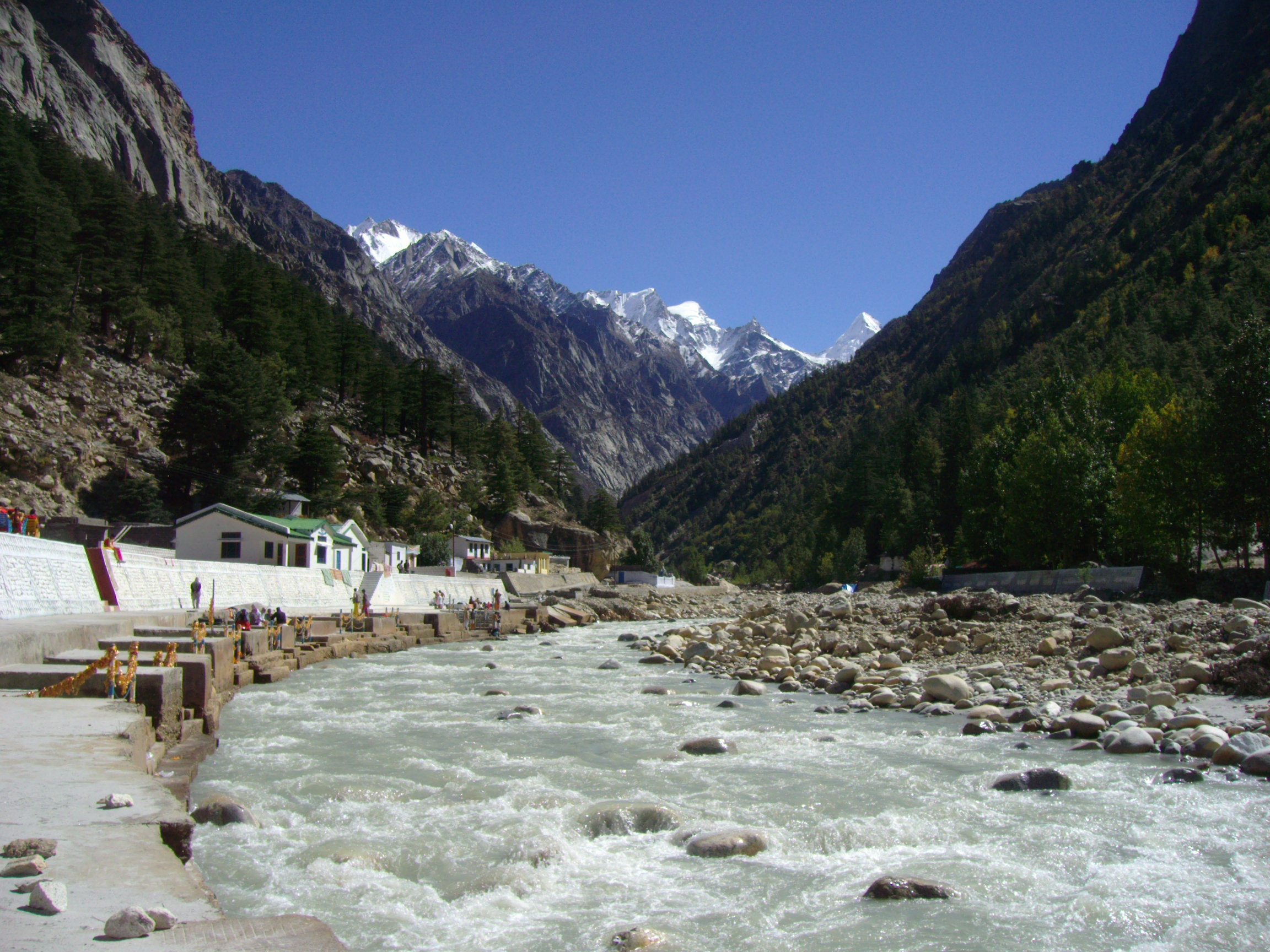
The Bhagirathi River, site of the Loharinag Pala Hydro Power Project the source stream of the Ganges River, in Gangotri, Uttarakhand

==== 2009 ====
Agrawal began a fast on 13 June 2009 at Uttarkashi. His demand was to allow the flow of the Ganges in its original channel in this 125 kilometres (78 mi) stretch from its origin. This is the only stretch left where the Ganges can still be seen undisturbed by man. The free-running of the river is a crucial element of its sacred status.

Before his fast began, Agrawal said, "The water ...(of the Ganges) is not ordinary water to a Hindu. It is a matter of life and death of Hindu faith".

An allegation by Uttarakhand Minister

Diwakar Bhatt, in a press conference, alleged that "It may be that the Central Intelligence Agency (CIA) of the US or Pakistan's Inter Service Intelligence (ISI) are behind these so-called anti-hydro projects in Uttarakhand, as by doing so they are hampering the development of the state and ultimately of India. So, they are traitors and should be opposed by people too."

==== 2013 ====
In mid-June 2013, Agrawal began his fast in the wake of the inactivity of National Ganga River Basin Authority. He stopped taking water on 21 September as his fast entered its 101st day. During his fast, three members of the National Ganga River Basin Authority: Rajendra Singh, Ravi Chopra and Rashid Siddiqui, resigned.

==== 2018 ====
In February 2018, Agrawal sent an open letter to Prime Minister Narendra Modi urging him to stop environmentally damaging projects and ensure the uninterrupted ('aviral') flow of the river in the upper stretches of the Ganga. He reminded the prime minister that "It will be four years in May when the Central government will complete four years in office, but nothing has been done so far for the cause of Ganga".

Agrawal had mentioned in the letter that if no action is taken by Ganga Dussehra (22 June 2018), he will go on fast-unto-death. He wrote another letter to PM on 13 June. After receiving no response from the government, he began his fast on 22 June at Haridwar.

On the 19th day of his fast, police evicted him from his fast venue to AIIMS Rishikesh. Based on a petition filed by Agrawal against forced eviction, the Uttarakhand High Court stepped in and said he needed to be taken to hospital only if his health was in danger.

The government responded to Agrawal's fast via Nitin Gadkari (Union Minister for Water Resources, River Development and Ganga Rejuvenation), but it failed to resolve the impasse. Agrawal said the government was focusing on cleaning the Ganga, whereas his aim was an 'aviral-nirmal' (free-flowing and clean) Ganga.

On 13 August (53rd day of the fast), Agrawal was admitted to AIIMS again.

On 9 October (the 109th day of the fast), he stopped drinking water and refused to take medicine, water or any fluid/juice orally. However, he gave written consent to doctors for administering potassium orally and a drip providing 500 ml of saline fluid per day to maintain the minimum fluid and electrolyte needs of the body.

On 11 October (the 111th day of the fast), he died from heart attack, aged 86.

=== Dam stopped ===
Work on the Loharinag Pala Hydro Power Project was stopped when Agrawal came close to dying on the 38th day of his fast in protest of the harnessing of the river Bhagirathi. In a letter dated 19 February 2009 to Agrawal, the Ministry of Power stated that it had ordered the immediate suspension of work on the Loharinag-Pala Hydropower Project on the Bhagirathi River. In response, Agrawal ended his fast the following day at 11:00 am. The Indian government agreed to speed up its inquiry into how electricity could be generated without the flow of the Ganges being impeded.

Agrawal attributed his campaign for the Ganges to his Hindu faith and his concern over the river's ecological and cultural significance.

=== National Ganges River Basin Authority ===
His campaign was taken up by leaders of the opposition party, who called for stopping all dam constructions upstream of the river. The Government of India was quick to commit itself to ensure perennial environmentally acceptable flows throughout the river and informing Agrawal of the same. The Government then went a step ahead and declared the Ganges a National River and set up the National Ganga River Basin Authority (NGRBA) as an empowered planning, implementing, and monitoring authority for the Ganges.

On 4 November 2009, in New Delhi, Prime Minister Manmohan Singh, also the chairman of NGRBA, directed the officials concerned to expedite the establishment of the National Ganges River Basin Research Institute (NGRBRI). The Centre for Environmental Studies and Technology (CEST), Banaras Hindu University was named the research institute that would act as knowledge centre for collecting and analysing all relevant data concerning the Ganges basin.

The objectives of NGRBRI are to:

- generate primary ecological data required by NGBRA for short and long-term planning of sustainable development of the Ganges River basin
- investigate the hydrology and pollution problems along the river basin
- study social, cultural and religious dimensions and develop eco-friendly technologies for sustainable development
- act as the knowledge centre for the collection and analysis of all relevant data concerning the Ganges basin
- create long-term models for future planning for maintaining water quality and its varied sustainable uses

On 10 February 2010, Union Minister of State (Independent Charge) for Environment and Forests Jairam Ramesh, addressing the Ganges–Yamuna summit organised by the Nehru Memorial Library and Museum said: "I have said in the Parliament that India is a civilisation of rivers, and it should not become a land of tunnels." He said some new projects on Bhagirathi River would not be allowed. "There are no two opinions. There is just one mass opinion that the projects proposed on the river Bhagirathi, named Pala Maneri and Bhaironghati projects, will not be entertained further by the government."
