= Ganga Mahasabha =

Indian organisation working for the conservation of the Ganges river

- Location: Uttarakhand, Uttar Pradesh, Bihar, Jharkhand and West Bengal
- Caused by: Pollution and damning of Ganges river in India.
- Methods: Public movement
- Status: Ongoing

Lead figures
Non centralised leadership	Prof. G. D. Agrawal; Justice Giridhar Malviya; Swami Jitendranand Saraswati	Vinay Kumar Tiwari

Ganga Mahasabha is an Indian organisation working for the conservation of the Ganges river, founded by Madan Mohan Malviya in 1905. National River Ganga Act 2012- aimed at addressing pollution in the river Ganges- was proposed by the Mahasabha but not drafted by the Government of India.
