= Sri Ranveer Sanskrit Vidyalaya =

BHU School in Varanasi, India

Location
- Kamachha; Varanasi, Uttar Pradesh; India
- Coordinates: 25.3050°N 82.9952°E

Information
- Other name: Ranveer Sanskrit Vidyalaya
- Former names: Jammu Kashmir Pathshala
- Funding type: Public
- Religious affiliation(s): Hinduism
- Established: 1883; 142 years ago
- Status: Active
- Oversight: Banaras Hindu University
- Website: Official website

Sri Ranveer Sanskrit Vidyalaya, informally Ranveer Sanskrit Vidyalaya or RSV is more than a century old Sanskrit school under the Banaras Hindu University in Varanasi, Uttar Pradesh India.

== History ==
Sri Ranveer Sanskrit Vidyalaya was established in 1883 by Maharaja Ranveer Singh, Maharaja of Jammu & Kashmir as the Jammu Kashmir Pathshala. In 1901, it was transferred to Central Hindu Collegiate of Annie Besant. On establishment of the Banaras Hindu University, the Ranveer Sanskrit Vidyalaya along with Central Hindu Girls School and Central Hindu Boys School was transferred to the Central Hindu School Board under Banaras Hindu University.

== Admissions ==
Admissions to Sri Ranveer Sanskrit Vidyalaya are done by the Office of Controller of Examinations, Banaras Hindu University. Intake is at class one, class six, seven, eight (Prathama), class nine (Praveshika) and class eleven (Madhyama).

== Hostel ==
In 2024, over a century old heritage building Charu Mahal was renovated and handed over to the Ranveer Sanskrit Vidyalaya for use as hostel by Banaras Hindu University with a capacity of 120 students. The school also has Bhargava House Hostel in Kamachha, Varanasi.
