= Prithvi Nath Kaula =

Indian librarian (1924–2009)

- Born: 13 March 1924; Srinagar, Jammu and Kashmir, British India
- Died: 30 August 2009 (aged 85); Lucknow, India
- Resting place: Lucknow, India
- Citizenship: Indian
- Education: Faculty of Arts, Banaras Hindu University
- Occupation: Library and Information Sciences specialist
- Years active: 1947-2009
- Known for: Library and Information Sciences
- Children: Five
- Awards: Padma Shri (2004)
- Website: Endowment website

Prithvi Nath Kaula (1924–2009) was an Indian librarian, Library and Information Sciences specialist and author who worked with the Banaras Hindu University in Varanasi, India. Kaula authored sixty books and monographs, six professional journals (founder-editor), over 400 scholarly journal, over 400 peer review, 43 bibliographies and 6000 notes. Kaula was also the recipient of the Padma Shri award in the year 2004.

== Early life ==
Prithvi Nath Kaula was born in 1924 in Srinagar, Jammu and Kashmir, British India into a Kashmiri Pandit family. His family belonged to the lower middle class. He completed his higher education Faculty of Arts in the Banaras Hindu University in Varanasi. In 1947, he was employed as a Librarian with the Birla Education Trust in Pilani. He later on became the Librarian at Central Library, BHU, Head of Department of Library and Information Science, BHU and the Dean of Faculty of Arts in the Banaras Hindu University.
