= Central Hindu School =

- B.H.U.
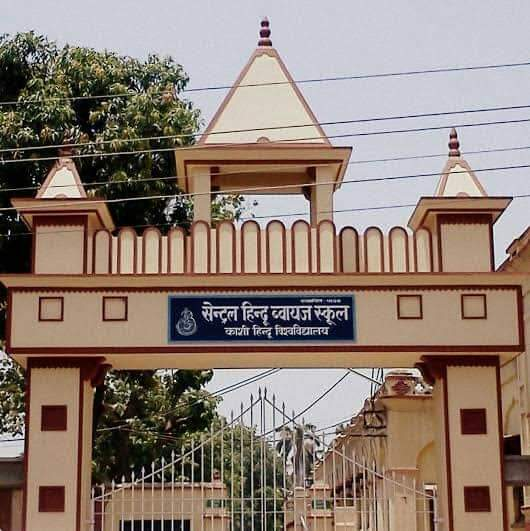
- Central Hindu School
- Kamachha, Varanasi; Varanasi, India, Uttar Pradesh, 221010; India

Information
- Other name: CHS
- Former name: Central Hindu College
- School type: Non Co-Ed
- Motto: Knowledge is vitality
- Established: 1898
- Founder: Annie Besant
- School board: CBSE
- Principal: Swati Aggarwal
- Teaching staff: 60-70 in Girls and 100–110 in Boys School
- Gender: Male and Female
- Age range: Maximum 18 years for admission in XI as on 30 September
- Classes offered: 6 to 12th
- Language: Hindi, English, Sanskrit, Urdu
- Hours in school day: 6
- Classrooms: 101
- Campus size: 70 acres
- Campus type: rectangular
- Slogan: vidyayaamritmashnute
- Nickname: CHS
- Publication: Banaras Hindu University Press
- Yearbook: Srijan
- Affiliation: Banaras Hindu University

Central Hindu School, located in Kamachha at the heart of the sacred city Varanasi, is one of India's largest educational institutions. The school is affiliated with the Central Board of Secondary Education and is overseen by Banaras Hindu University (since 1976). The institution was formerly known as Central Hindu College, and its Senior High School program (11th standard) was previously called Pre University Course.

== History ==
In July 1898, Annie Besant, a renowned freedom-fighter, founded the school with Dr. Arthur Richardson, a science graduate from England, as its principal. The school was later dedicated to Pt. Madan Mohan Malviya by Besant, and eventually became the nucleus of Banaras Hindu University when it was established in 1916. The administration of the school now falls under the responsibility of the university. The ruler of the Indian Princely State of Benares State, Prabhu Narayan Singh, played a key role in setting up the school and donated land for its establishment.

Initially, the school offered undergraduate classes and operated as a loaner for Banaras Hindu University, which was still under construction. The Central Hindu College, as it was known then, was handed over to the Hindu University Society on 27 November 1915, and it became a constituent college of the newly-formed university through a government notification in October 1917. The Sayaji Rao Gaekwad Library, which is now the Central Library of BHU, was first housed in the Telang Library of the College in 1917.

In 1917, George Arundale, a Theosophist, joined the school as a history teacher and eventually became its head. CHBS is one of the oldest schools in Varanasi and has the longest playground in the Purvanchal region, where many colleges in Varanasi hold football tournaments. It also has the Sarga Hall, which is one of the longest halls, and a historical library established in 1912 known as the Kashinath Traimbak Telang Library. The library holds over 30,000 valuable books, including encyclopedias, novels, and old books on various subjects, in addition to numerous magazines, newspapers, and digests. To promote mathematics and science, the school has been organizing the Ramanujan Memorial Mathematics Contest and the Sir C. V. Raman Science Quiz since 1988.

== Campus ==
The school campus covers an area of 70 acres and encompasses the school, hostel, and a range of facilities such as laboratories for physics, chemistry, biology, mathematics, computer science, psychology, fine art, German language, French, Italian, artificial intelligence, coding, programming, Python, C++, Java and also include an agricultural sector. The campus also has a gym and a library, and over 50 classrooms, as well as several halls. Sporting facilities include a football field, cricket field, basketball court, and tennis courts. The school hosts an annual inter-school football competition, which is a major sporting event held on the school grounds.

== Cultural programs ==
The school also organizes cultural programs at a grand level, such as Krishna Janmastami and the anniversary of Annie Besant (October 1), among others. Additionally, an annual day celebration is held at the school.

== Reservation ==
According to the BHU EC resolution dated March 29/30, 1996, the following reservations will be granted for admissions in the seats available for admission in various classes, after seats have been allotted to internal students:

- 15% seats are reserved for Schedule Caste candidates.
- 7.5% seats are reserved for Schedule Tribe candidates.
- 27% seats are reserved for Other Backward class candidates.
- 5% seats are reserved for physically challenged physically challenged candidates, as per disability act 32(1) 2016
- 50% seats available for admission shall be provided to the sons and daughters of permanent employees of BHU, subject to securing a minimum of 33% marks in Entrance Test.

== Publications ==
- Sanatana Dharma: an advanced text book of Hindu religion and Ethics. Central Hindu College, Benaras. 1904.

== Noted alumni ==
- Jayant Vishnu Narlikar: Indian Astrophysicist
- K. N. Govindacharya: social and political activist
- Kamalapati Tripathi: writer, journalist, editor, freedom-fighter, Politician, Chief Minister of Uttar Pradesh and Union Minister for Railways.
- Kaushalendra Singh: Mayor of Varanasi
- Sri Prakasa: politician, freedom-fighter, governor & administrator. India's first High Commissioner to Pakistan.

== See also ==
- Central Hindu Girls School
- Central Hindu Boys School
