= Central Hindu Boys School =

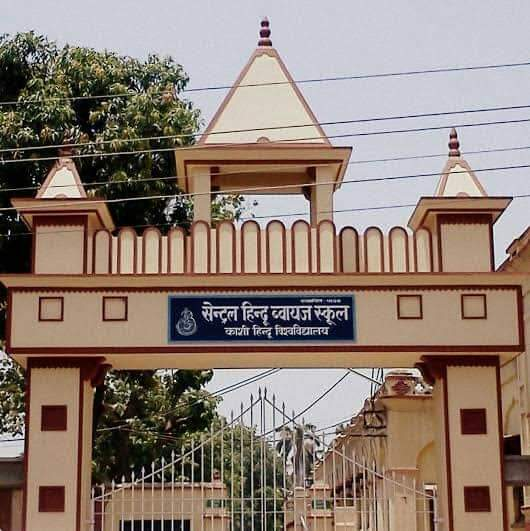

Location
- Kamachha; Bhelupur; Varanasi, Uttar Pradesh, 221010; India
- Coordinates: 25.303968°N 82.996251°E

Information
- School type: Government Secondary school
- Mottoes: Knowledge imparts immortality
- Religious affiliation: Culture
- Founded: 7 July 1898
- Founder: Annie Besant, Arthur Richardson
- Status: Open
- Sister school: Central Hindu Girls School
- School board: CBSE
- School district: Varanasi
- School number: UP08624
- School code: UP08624
- Principal: Swati Agrawal
- Teaching staff: ~70
- Grades: Percentage System
- Gender: Boys
- Enrolment: 2,020
  - Kindergarten: 35 CHS RGSC MZP
  - Grade 1: 35 CHS RGSC MZP
  - Grade 2: 35 CHS RGSC MZP
  - Grade 3: 35 CHS RGSC MZP
  - Grade 4: 35 CHS RGSC MZP
  - Grade 5: 35 CHS RGSC MZP
  - Grade 6: 200 (in 4 sections)
  - Grade 7: 200 (in 4 sections)
  - Grade 8: 200 (in 4 sections)
  - Grade 9: 300 (in 6 sections)
  - Grade 10: 400 (in 6 sections)
  - Grade 11: 410 (in 8 sections)
  - Grade 12: 410 (in 7 sections)
- Classes: VI to XII
- Average class size: 52
- Education system: Secondary school
- Language: English and Hindi
- Schedule: 8AM to 2PM [Summer] 10AM to 4PM [Winter]
- Hours in school day: 8
- Classrooms: 50+
- Campus size: 70 acres
- Campus type: Urban
- Houses: Shivaji, Tagore, Ashok & Raman
- Colours: Safron, Green, Red, & Blue
- Nickname: CHBS
- Publication: Sanatana Dharma
- Yearbook: Srijan
- School fees: Approx 4000
- Affiliation: CBSE
- Website: www.bhu.ac.in ,www.chbsbhu.in

Central Hindu Boys School aka C.H.B.S is a boys secondary school (day school with hostel facility) in Kamachha, Bhelupur, Varanasi. It was established in 1898 by Annie Besant. It is associated with Banaras Hindu University.

== History ==
Asia's first Educational conference was held in the ground of the Central Hindu Boys School. Central Hindu Boys School was established in 1898 by Dr. Annie Besant. Ruler of the Indian Princely State of Benares State (Royal House of Benares) Prabhu Narayan Singh was instrumental in setting up the school and donated requisite land for the school.

It started as high school (from grade VI to X). Annie Besant originally intended to convert this school into a degree college and sought approval from Prayag Vishwavidyalaya (Allahabad University). The school also housed classes for Faculty of Arts, Banaras Hindu University and ran classes as loner for the Banaras Hindu University.

In 1914, on request of Pandit Madan Mohan Malaviya, Besant handed over the college (then known as Central Hindu College) to Banaras Hindu University for establishing the university.

=== Association with BHU ===
The school housed the first faculty (Faculty of Arts) of Banaras Hindu University till 1916. Banaras Hindu University was started on the campus of this school (with class rooms on loan) and functioned there till it relocated to its current location in 1916. In 1914 Pandit Madan Mohan Malaviya requested Dr. Besant to hand over the school (then called Central Hindu College) to Banaras Hindu University. On 27 November 1915, the school was handed over to the university. The school became a constituent college of the Banaras Hindu University in October 1917 after the Government issued a notification. The Sayaji Rao Gaekwad Library, BHU was first housed in the Telang Library of the College in 1917. Noted theosophist, George Arundale joined the school as a history teacher in 1917 and later became the head of the school.

Till 1976, Banaras Hindu University had been conducting High School (grade X) of the school. Senior High School (11th standard) was called Pre University Course (PUC) and later the same students could join Banaras Hindu University directly for their undergraduate courses. In 1976, the school adopted the 10+2 education system and got affiliated with CBSE. The school is a part of the Banaras Hindu University and is governed by its administration.

== Campus ==
Central Hindu Boys School's campus spreads over 70 acres and houses the school, hostel, laboratories (Physics, Chemistry, Biology, Mathematics, Computer, Psychology & Agriculture),gym and library. The school library has more than 30,000 publications. The school has over 50 classrooms and houses several halls.

Football field, cricket field, basketball court and tennis courts are amongst the sporting facilities available. Annual inter school football competition, which is held at the school grounds, is one of the major sport event of the school.

== Academic programs ==
The school offers education from grade VI to XII in English and Hindi mediums. From grades VI to X, all students follow same curriculum with exception of 'optional' subjects and medium of education; in grades XI and XII, students can opt between Science, Commerce and Arts as main courses.

== Publications ==
- Sanatana Dharma: An advanced text book of Hindu religion and Ethics. Central Hindu College, Benaras. 1904.

== Notable alumni ==
- Jayant Narlikar, astrophysicist
- Kaushalendra Singh, politician
- Sri Prakasa, politician

== See also ==
- Central Hindu School
- Banaras Hindu University
- List of educational institutions in Varanasi
