= Bhelupur, Varanasi =

Bhelupur
- Suburb
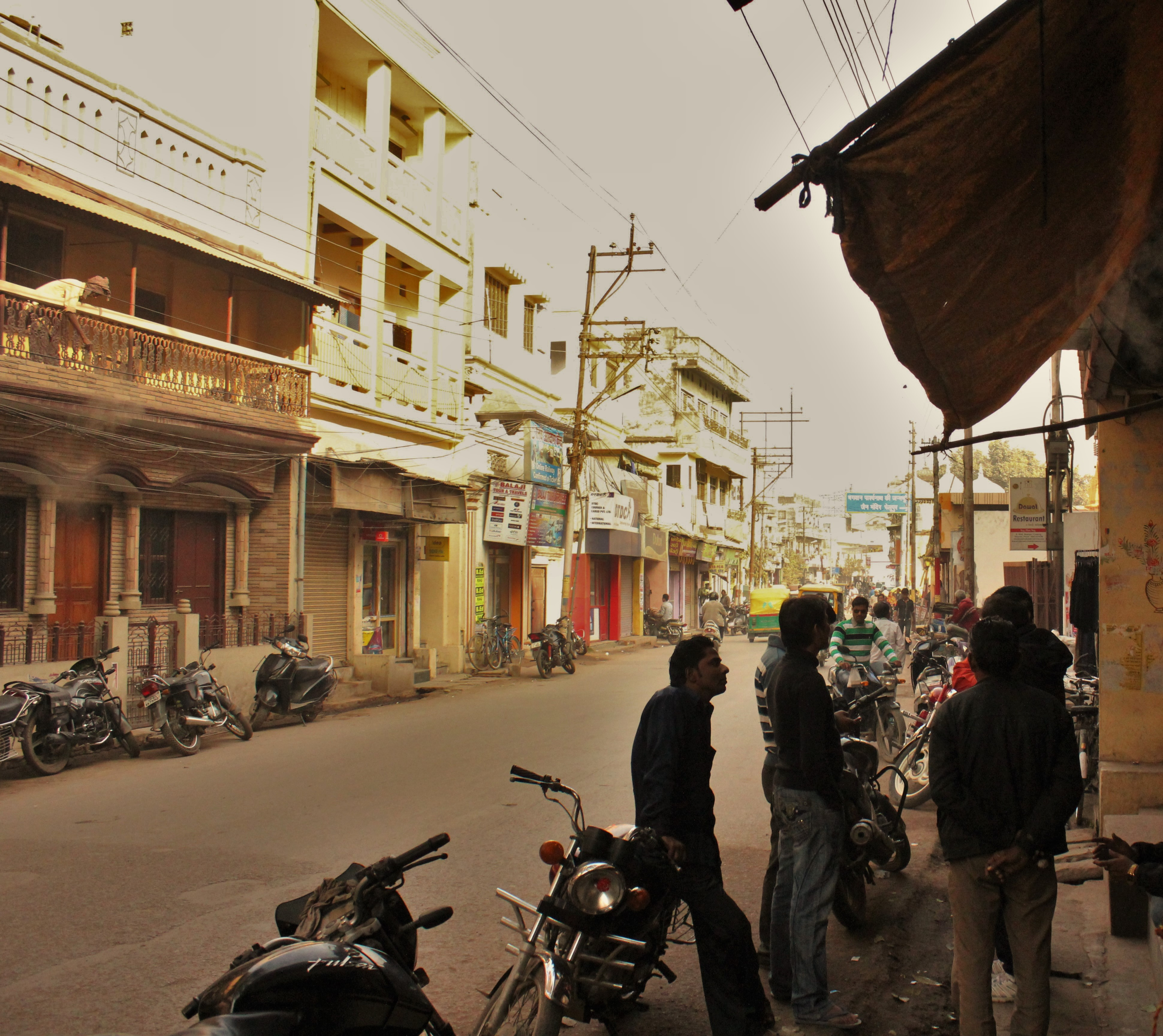
- Bhelupur, main road. (West to East view leading to Bhelupur Police Station). Picture taken from Water Works. Road is called "Kamachha Road"

- Area location on Varanasi district map
- Coordinates: 25.303969°N 82.990008°E
- Country: India
- State: Uttar Pradesh
- District: Varanasi

Government
  - Body: Varanasi Nagar Nigam
  - MP: Narendra Modi; BJP(since 2014)
  - MLA: Jyotsana Srivastava; BJP (since 2012); Varanasi Cantonment
- Elevation: 85 m (279 ft)

Languages
  - Official: Hindi
- Time zone: UTC+5:30 (IST)
- Postal code: 221010
- Telephone code: +91-542
- Vehicle registration: UP65 XXXX
- District website: Official website

Bhelupur (a.k.a. Bhelupura) is a suburban neighbourhood located in south of Varanasi district (Uttar Pradesh). It is situated 2.5 kilometres west of Kedar ghat and to the river Ganges. Benaras Hindu University is situated 4.5 kilometres south of Bhelupur.

Bhelupur is bounded by Rathyatra in North, Lanka in South, Sonarpura in East and Sudamapur Bari Gaibi in the West.

== Places of importance ==
By the virtue of being a part of one of the oldest cities in the world (Varanasi), Bhelupur's history dates several hundred years back and houses several places of historical and touristic importance & interest.

- Tulsi Manas Mandir: This temple has both, historical as well as cultural importance in Hinduism. The ancient Hindu epic Ramcharitmanas was originally written at this place by Hindu poet-saint, reformer and philosopher Tulsidas. In 1964, a temple (called Tulsi Manas Mandir) was built.
- Durga Mandir & Durga Kund: Durga Temple is the temple for Goddess Durga and was built in the 18th century. The temple was constructed by Bengali Maharani (Bengali Queen) and has a pond (Kund) adjacent to it (hence the name "Durga Kund").
- Vijayanagaram palace: Bhelupur houses the palace of Maharaja of Vijayanagaram. The palace is believed to be built in 18th century AD There is a residential colony called Vijay Nagar colony adjacent to the palace. Constructed in the 1970s, this colony is housed on the palace's compound and is reportedly one of the oldest in Varanasi.
- Shri Digambar Jain Temple: Shri Digambar Jain Temple is the birthplace of Parshvanatha, the twenty-third Tirthankara of Jainism.
- Central Hindu School: Established in 1898 by Dr. Annie Besant, Central Hindu School is India's one of the largest schools. From 1898 to 1916, this school conducted under graduation classes (as a loaner) for Banaras Hindu University (founded by Pandit Madan Mohan Malaviya) as the university was under construction during that time.
- Shri Tilbhandeshwar Mahadev Mandir: Tilbhandeshwar Mahadev Mandir is one of the oldest and most famous temples in the holy city of Varanasi. This temple has great religious importance in Hinduism and is dedicated to the Lord Shiva.
Places of importance: Picture gallery

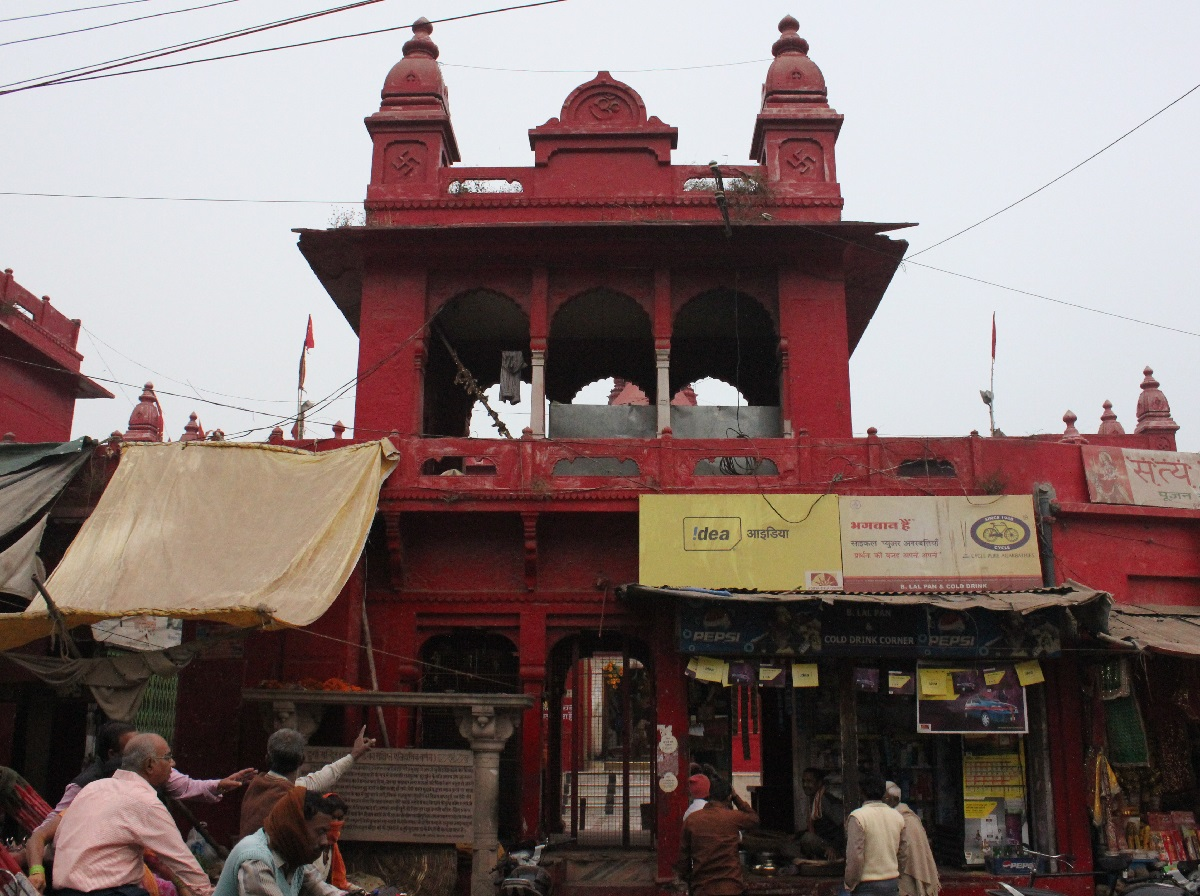
Durga Temple entrance

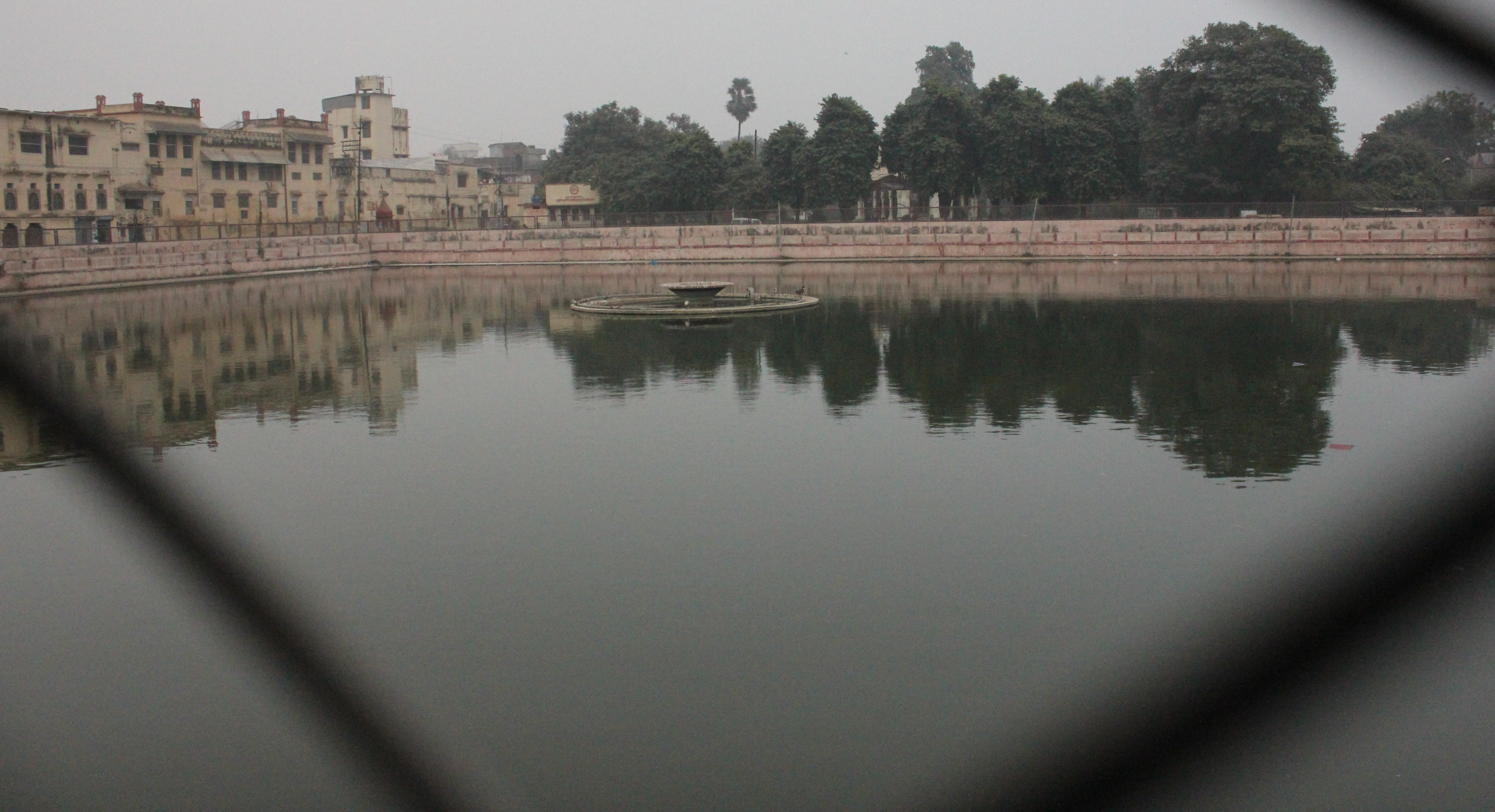
Durga Kund

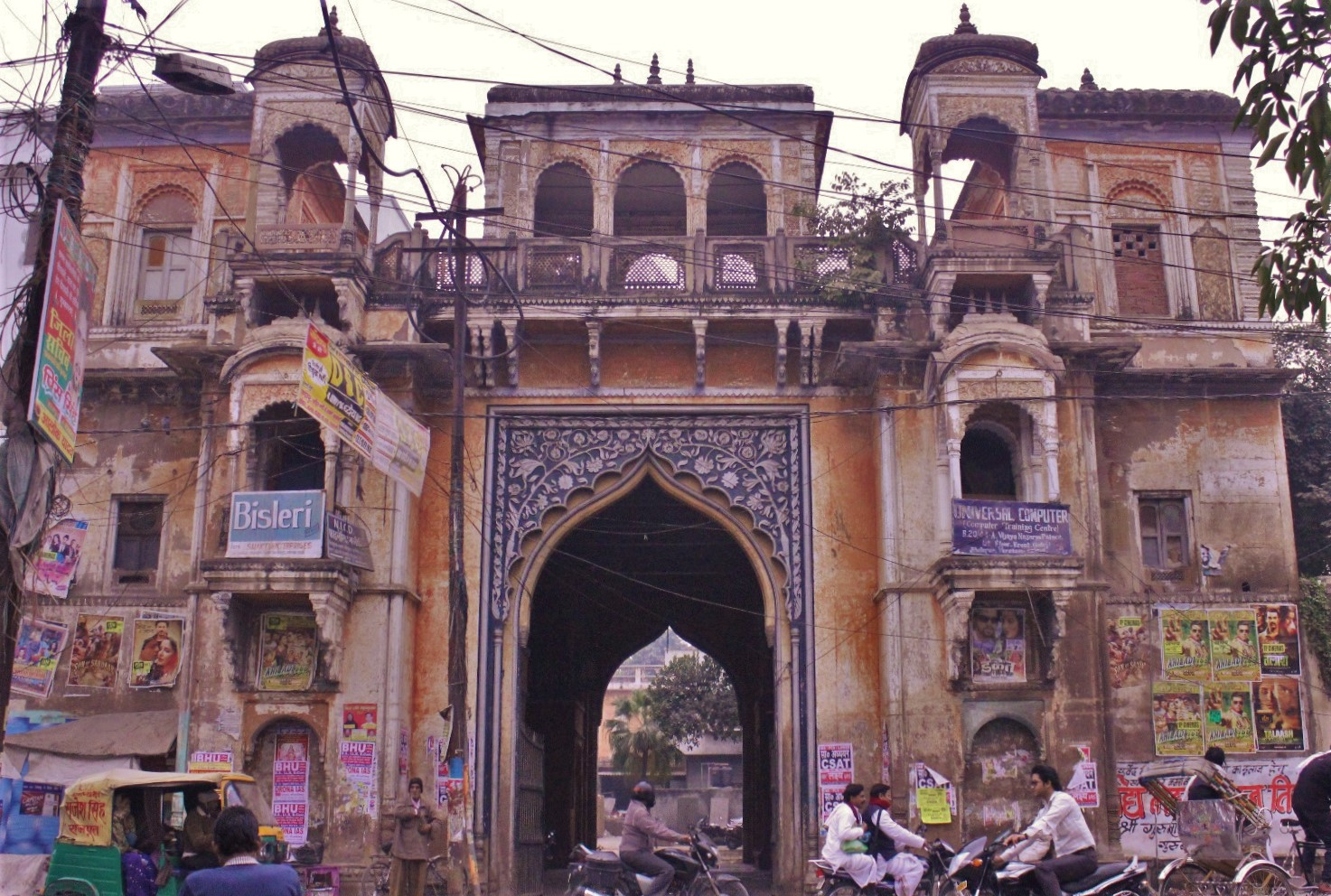
Vijayanagaram palace

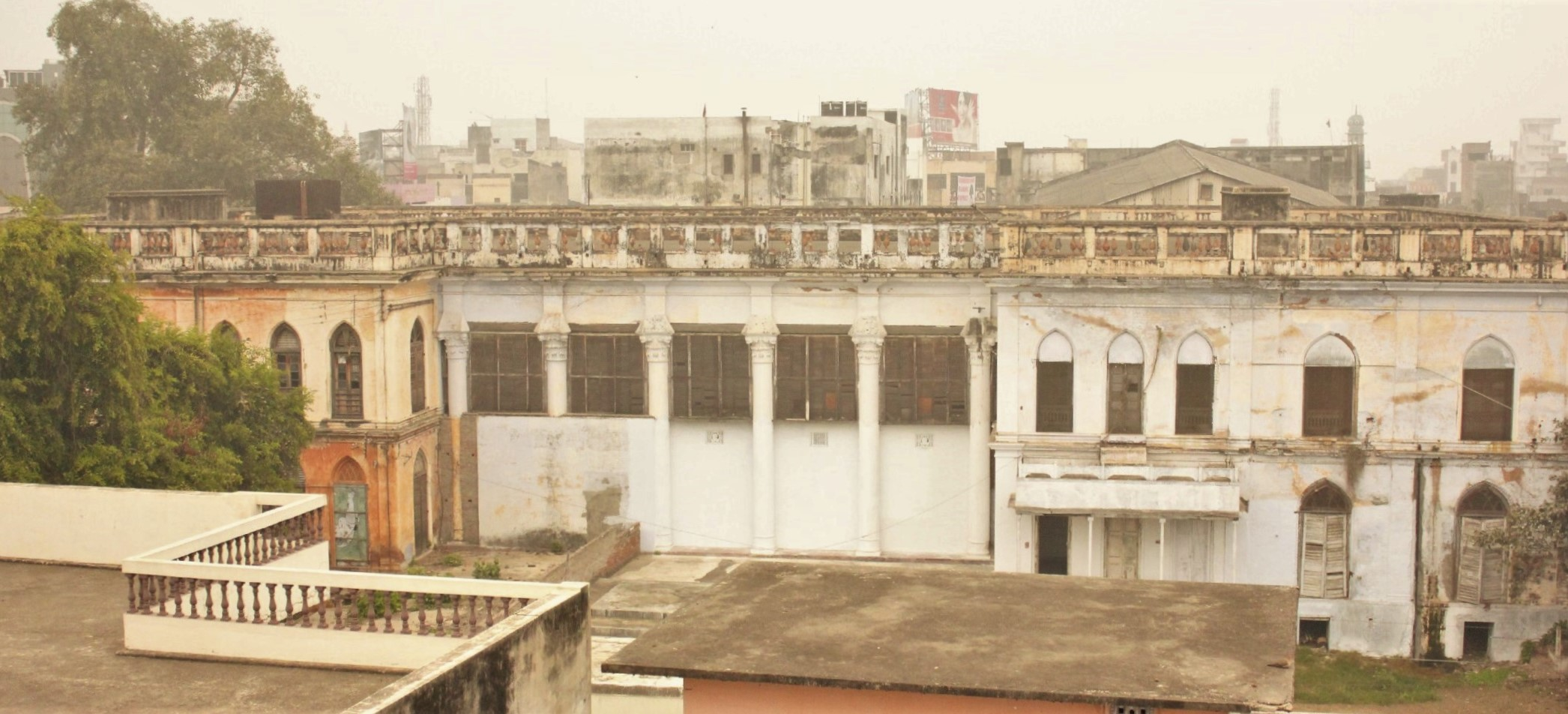
Vijayanagaram palace

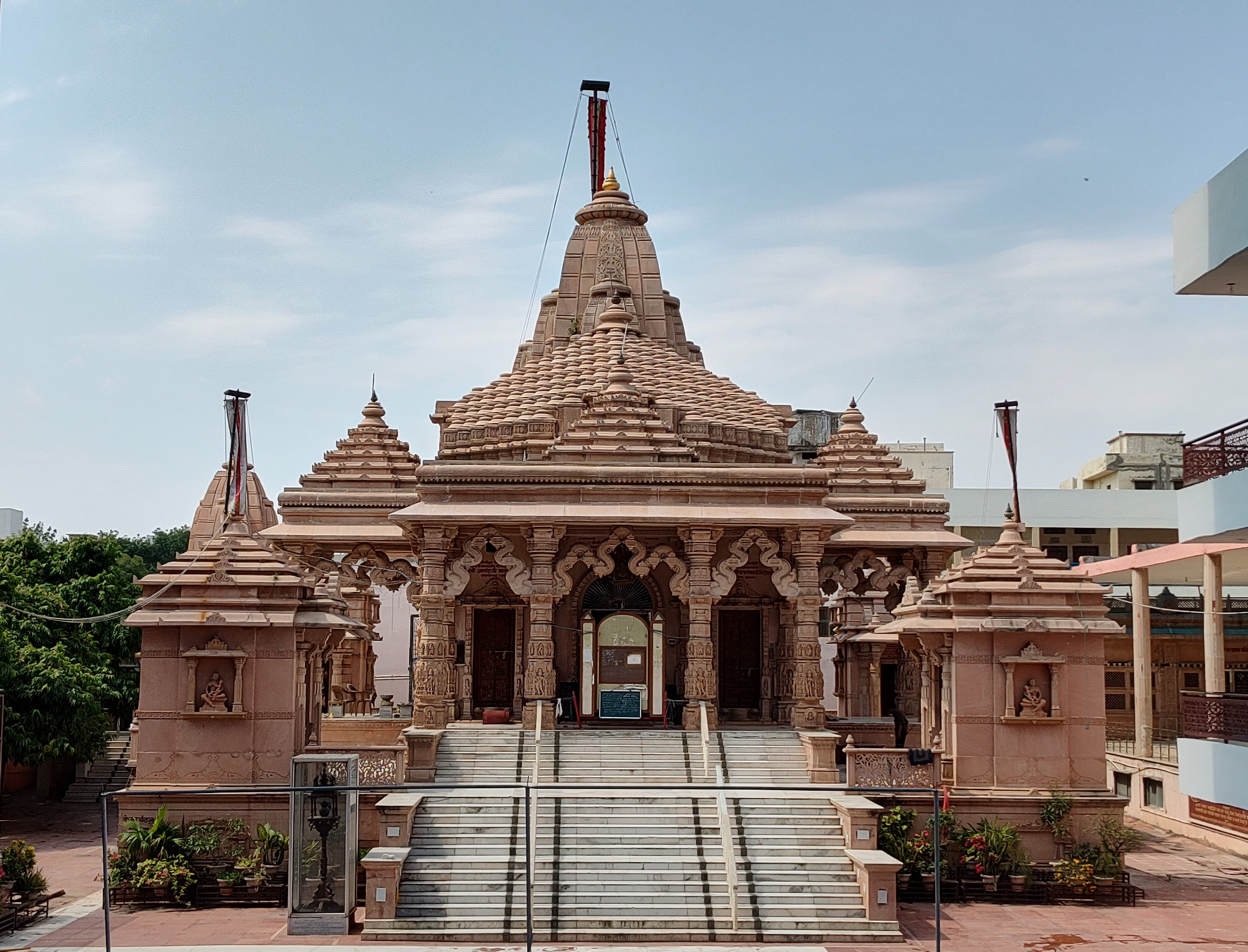
Jain Mandir in Bhelupur

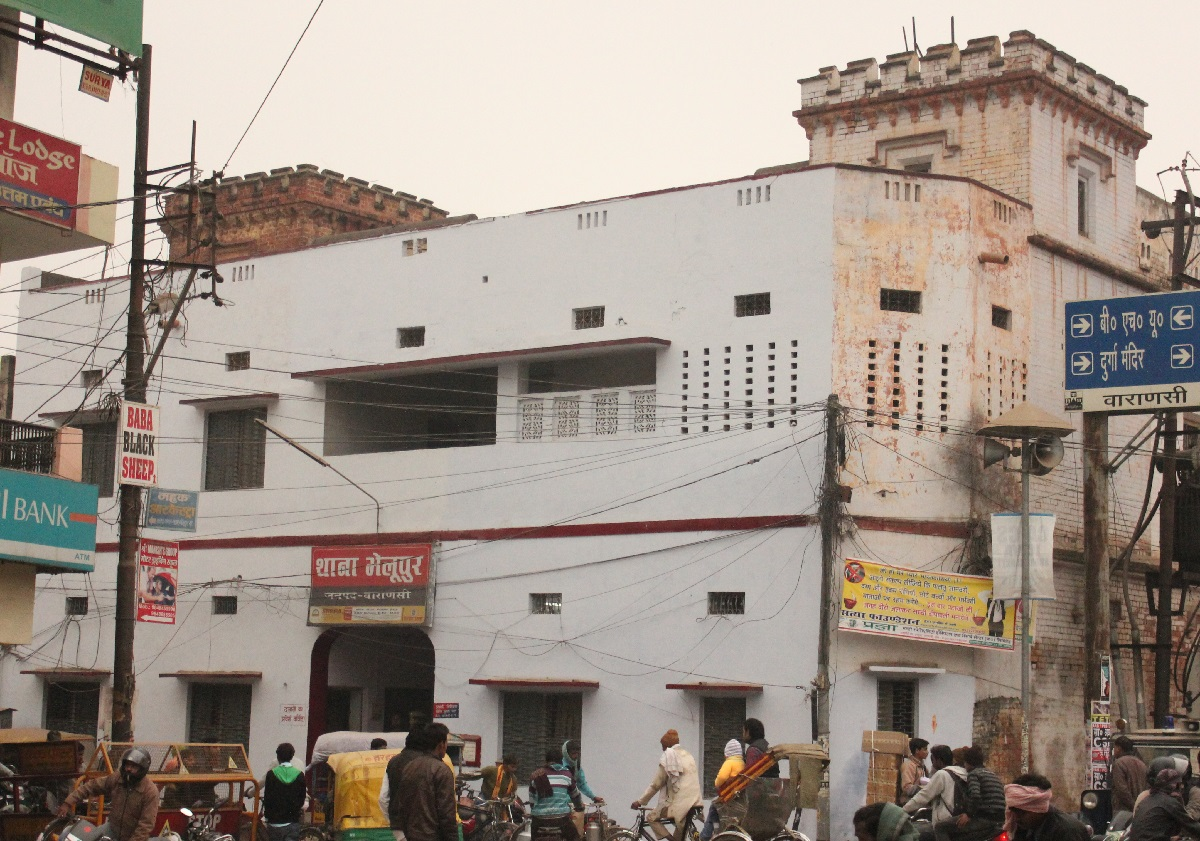
Bhelupur Police station

== Education ==
Bhelupur has several schools and colleges; some dating back to the late 19th century.

- Central Hindu Boys School
- Central Hindu Girls School
- Vasant Kanya Mahavidyalaya.
- C.M. Anglo Bengali Inter College.
- Besant Theosophical School.

== Geography ==
Bhelupur is situated in centre of Varanasi city and South of Varanasi district. Kamchchha, Gurubaugh, Ashfaq Nagar, Khojwan, Gurudham colony, Jawahar Nagar colony, Padampuri colony, Ravindra Puri and Durga Kund are a part of Bhelupur jurisdiction.

== Transportation ==
Bhelupur is served by Varanasi railway station (3 kilometres) and Varanasi airport (21 kilometres).
