= Faculty of Arts, Banaras Hindu University =

Faculty in Banaras Hindu University, Uttar Pradesh, India

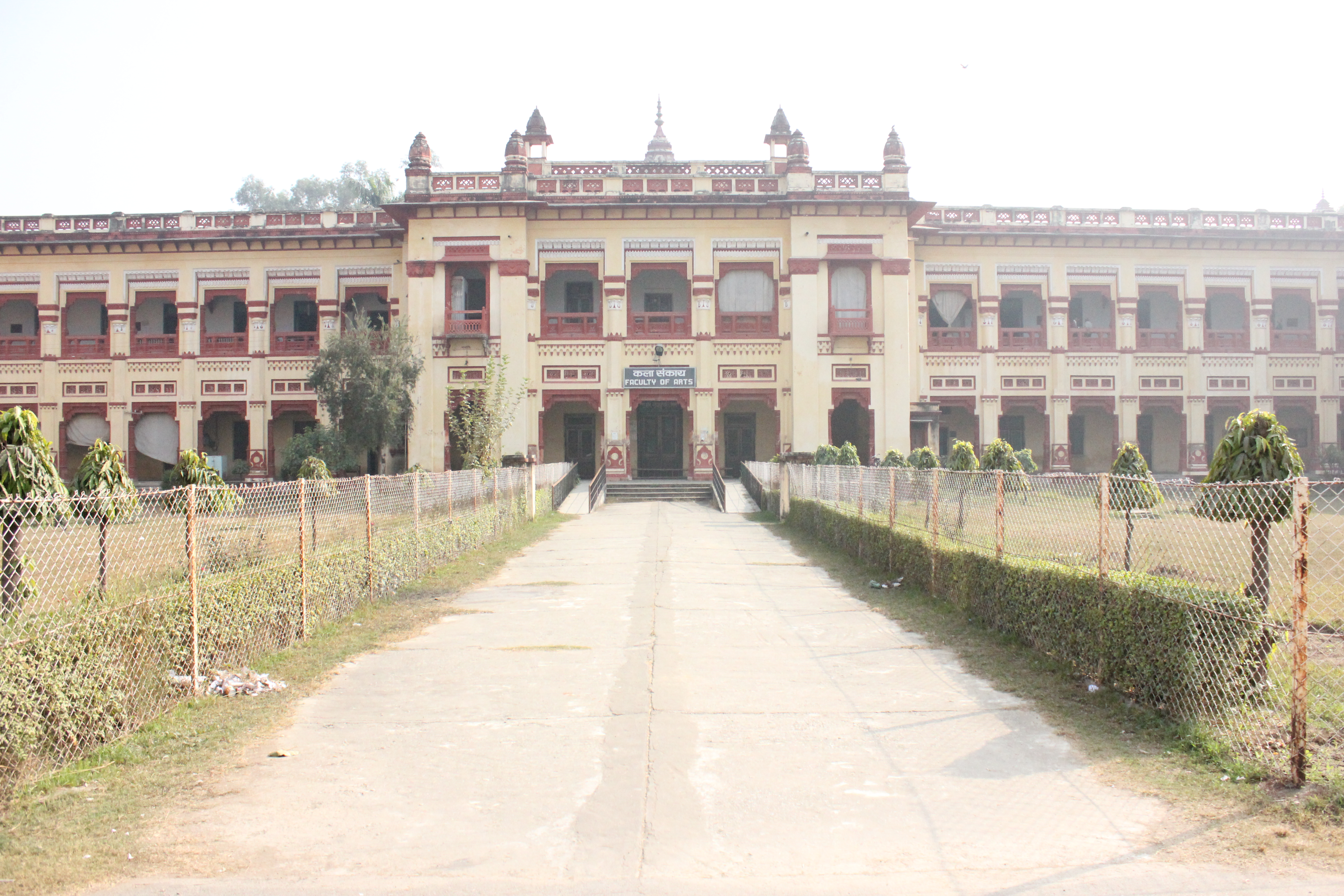
- Faculty of Arts (seen from North-West)
- Type: Faculty
- Established: 1898
- Parent institution: Banaras Hindu University
- Affiliations: UGC
- Academic affiliations: Banaras Hindu University
- Dean: Prof.Sushma Ghidhiyal
- Location: Varanasi, Uttar Pradesh, India; 25°16′12″N 82°59′43″E
- Campus: Urban
- Website: Faculty of Arts

Faculty of Arts, Banaras Hindu University is a faculty in the Banaras Hindu University, Varanasi, India which offers courses in Humanities along with various professional and vocational courses except social sciences. It was founded in 1898 and is the oldest and largest faculty in the University. Faculty of Arts was formerly known as the Central Hindu College (1898–1916). In 1916, the Banaras Hindu University grew around the nucleus of the Faculty of Arts.

== History ==
Formally known as Central Hindu College, the Faculty of Arts is the oldest and largest faculty in the Banaras Hindu University. It was founded in 1898 by Annie Besant and became the main centre and the core of the Banaras Hindu University in 1916 founded by Mahamana Pandit Madan Mohan Malviya. The Faculty of Arts is often called the mother faculty of the University, many other faculties and departments of the university grew around it.

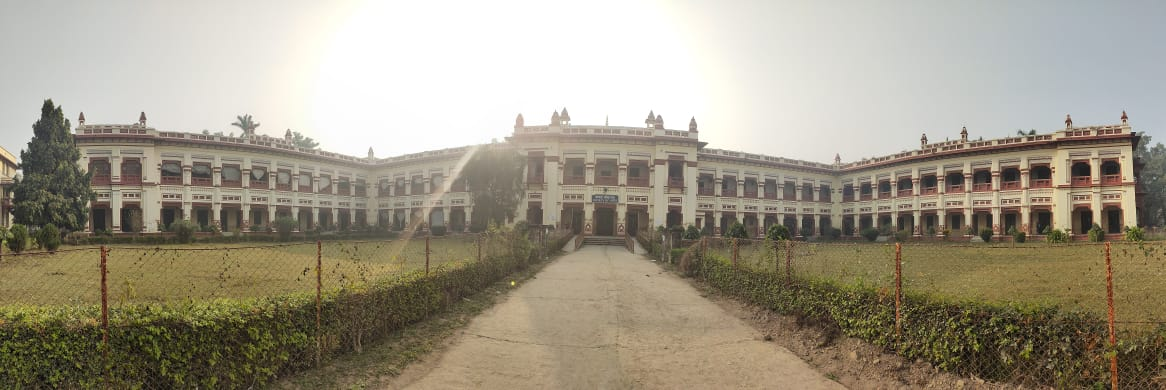
The faculty was bifurcated to create the Faculty of Social Sciences in 1971, and coeducational classes were started in the two faculties in 2017. Old CHC Building (Panoramic View)

== Organization ==
Faculty of Vusual Arts' administrative head is a dean. The dean is responsible for all aspects of the faculty's operations, including budgets, administration, planning, support services, faculty appointments, curricula and student affairs. The dean is appointed by and reports to the Vice-Chancellor of the university.

There are 23 different departments in the Faculty of Arts that offer Certificate courses, Special courses, Undergraduate diploma, undergraduate degree (UG), advanced postgraduate diploma, postgraduate degree (PG) and Doctorate in following three categoriesHistory, Culture and Philosophy; Language and Literature; and Professional and Vocational courses.

== Departments ==
The faculty houses departments of various languages such as those of English, Bengali, French, Hindi, Sanskrit, Telugu, German, Marathi, Arabic, Urdu, Persian other foreign languages, other Indian languages; it also houses departments of linguistics, archaeology, Pali & Buddhism, philosophy and religion, physical education, journalism, history of art, and library science. The faculty has niche departments such as Bhojpuri Adhyayan Kendra (transl. Bhojpuri Studies Centre), Bharat Adhyayan Kendra (transl. Indian subcontinent Studies Centre), and Malaviya Moolya Anusheelan Kendra (transl. Malviya Centre of Ethics and Human Values).

== Notable alumni ==
Notable alumni of the faculty of arts include:

Name	Course	Subject	Year	Occupation	Remarks
Ahmad Hasan Dani	MA	Sanskrit	1944	Pakistani intellectual, archaeologist, historian & linguist	First Muslim graduate of BHU
Anant Sadashiv Altekar	–	–	–	Historian, archaeologist and numismatist	
Awadh Kishore Narain	MA	AIHC	1947	Indian historian, archaeologist & numismatist	
B. D. Lakshman	BA	–	–	Indo-Fijian politician, union leader & businessman	
Baldev Upadhyaya	MA	Sanskrit	1922	Hindi & Sanskrit scholar, literary historian, essayist & critic	Padma Bhushan awardee
Colin Turnbull	MA	Indian Religion & Philosophy	1947	British-American anthropologist	
Kashinath Singh	PhD	Hindi	1965	Indian writer and scholar of Hindi language	Sahitya Akademi Awardee
Koenraad Elst	MA	Indology	1992	Orientalist and Indologist	–
Kuber Nath Rai	–	Hindi & Sanskrit	–	Hindi literature & Sanskrit scholar	–
Lal Mani Joshi	MA	Pali	1964	Buddhist scholar	–
Liu Anwu	MA	Hindi	1958	Chinese translator	–
Ma Su Krishnamurthy	MA	Hindi	1962	Kannada and Hindi writer	–
Manu Bhandari	MA	Hindi	1953	Hindi writer	–
Paragu	–	–	–	Burmese writer	–
Prithvi Nath Kaula	–	–	–	Library and Information Sciences specialist	Padma Shri awardee.
Rajbali Pandey	PhD	–	–	Indian writer and author	
Ram Krishna Singh	MA	English	1972	Reviewer, critic and contemporary poet	–
Rewa Prasad Dwivedi	MA	Sanskrit	1962	Sanskrit scholar and poet	
Robert M. Pirsig	MA	Eastern Philosophy & culture	1954	American writer and philosopher	–
Umanath Singh	BA, MA	Hindi, Sanskrit & History	1956, 1958	Indian professor	
Sarveshwar Dayal Saxena	-	-	-	Hindi writer, poet, columnist and playwright	–
Satya Vrat Shastri	PhD	Sanskrit	-	Sanskrit scholar, writer, grammarian and poet	–
Shankar Dayal Singh	BA	-	-	Indian Politician	–
Sita Ram Chaturvedi	-	-	-	Indian educator, dramatist and scholar of Hindi and Sanskrit language and literature	-

== See also ==
- List of educational institutions in Varanasi
