= Parshvanath Jain temples, Varanasi =

Group of temples in Uttar Pradesh, India

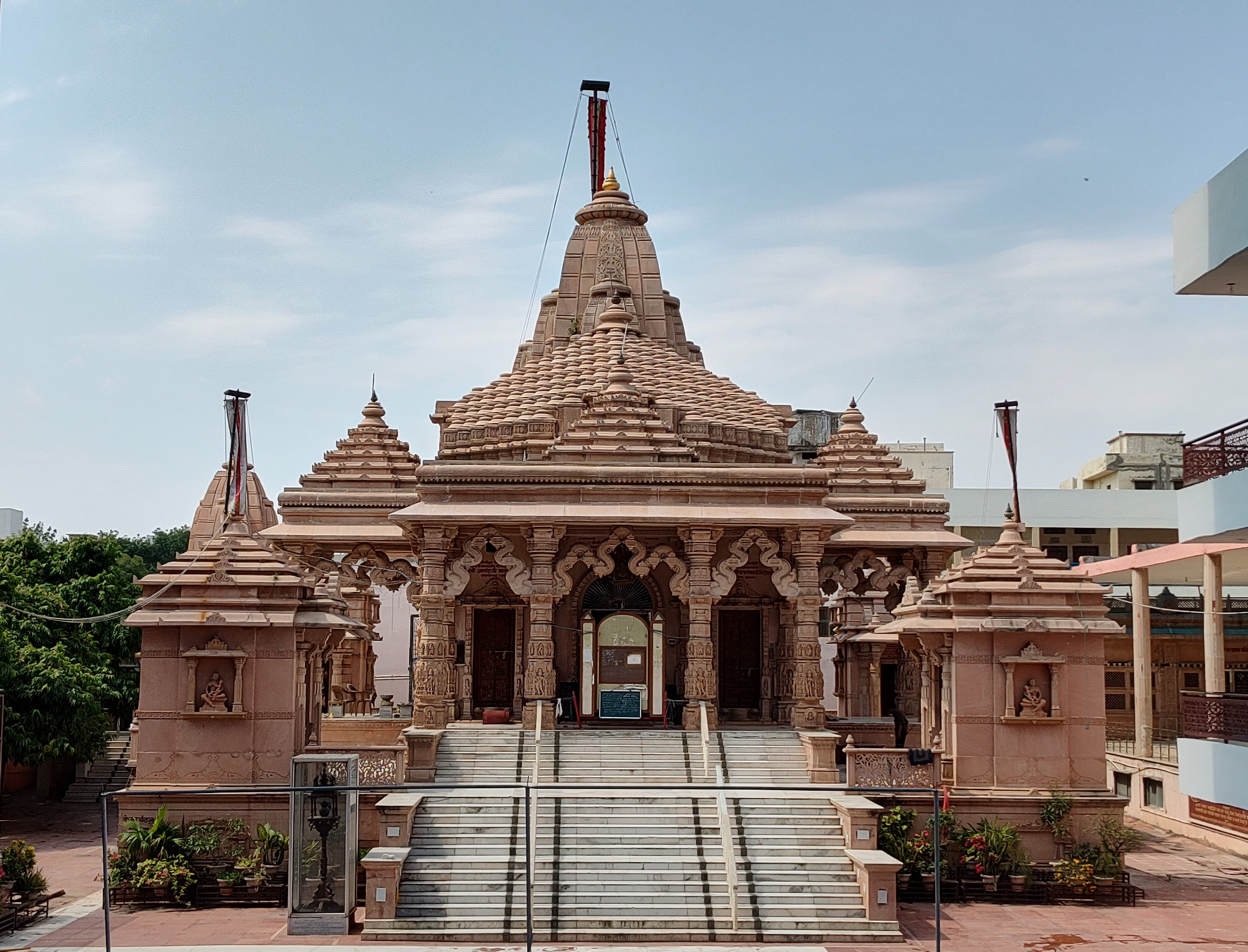
- Śvētāmbara Jain Temple Bhelupur, Varanasi

Religion
- Affiliation: Jainism
- Sect: Digambar, Śvētāmbara
- Deity: Parshvanath
- Festival: Mahavir Jayanti

Location
- Location: Bhelupur, Varanasi, Uttar Pradesh
- Interactive map of Parshvanath Jain temples, Varanasi
- Coordinates: 25°17′58.3″N 82°59′59.8″E

Architecture
- Temple: 3

Parshvanath Jain temples, Varanasi is a group of three Jain temples located in Bhelupur, Uttar Pradesh.

== History ==
According to Jain literature, Varanasi was ruled by King Aśvasena, the father of Parshvanatha, in 9th century. Varanasi is as one of the holiest Jain pilgrimage centres and believed to be birthplace of four Tirthankar — Parshvanatha, Suparshvanatha, Chandraprabha and Shreyansanath. This is considered as one of the holiest pilgrimage places. Bhelpur is believed to be birthplace of Parshvanath, the 23rd Thirthankara, hence, a place for three kalyanak - Chyavan, Janma, and Deeksha. Mahavira also delivered sermons at Varanasi and Sarnath.

Vividha Tirtha Kalpa, composed by Jinaprabha Suri in the 14th century CE, gives a detailed description of this temple.

== Description ==
The temple has a 75 centimetres (2.46 ft) black-coloured digambar idol of Parshvanatha dating back to 9th-11th century and a 60 centimetres (2.0 ft) white Śvetāmbara idol of Parshvanatha. It is in Bhelupur about 5 km from the center of Varanasi city and 3 km from the Banaras Hindu University. It belongs to both sects of Jainism and is a tirtha or pilgrimage centre for Jains.

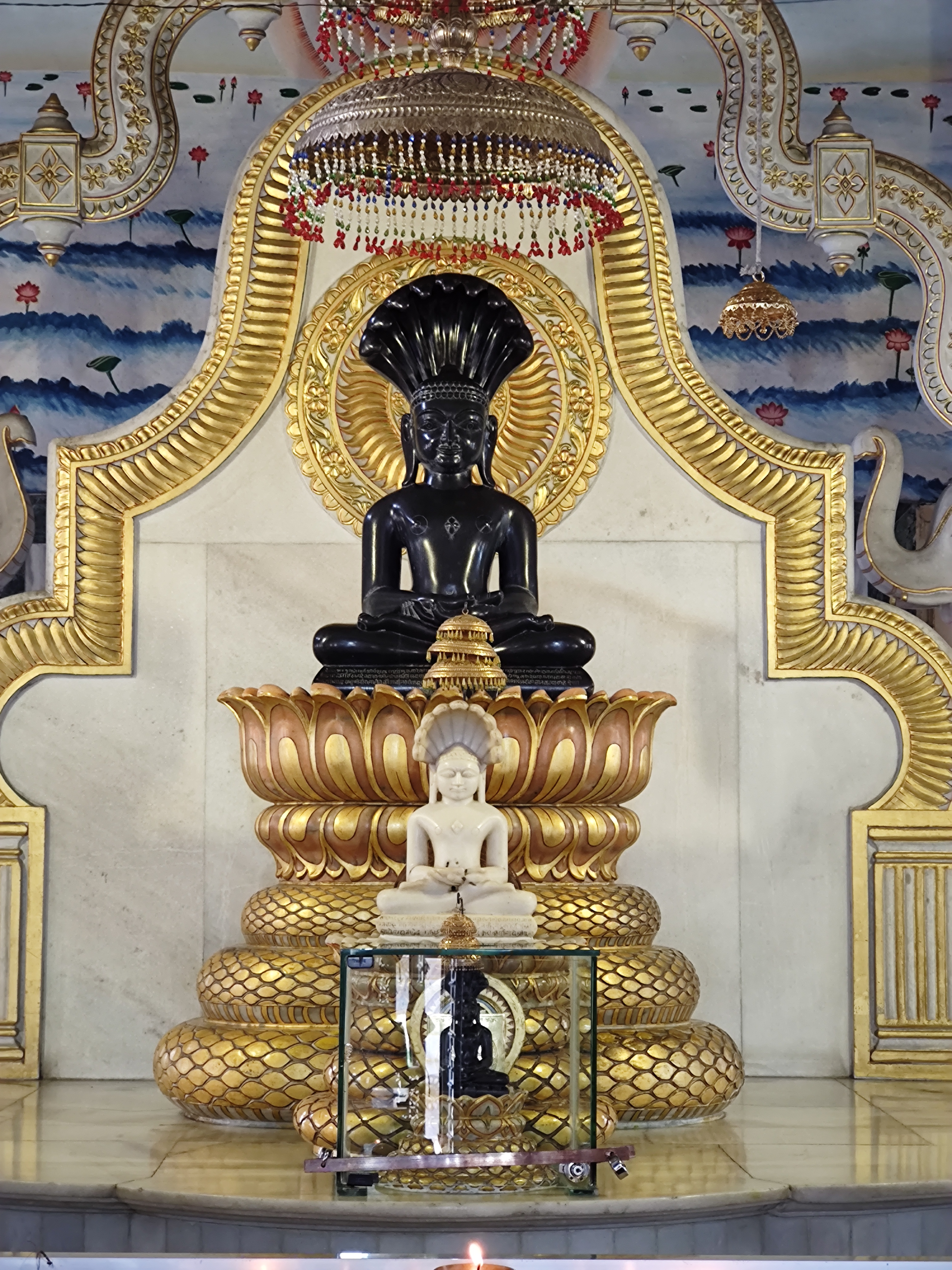
Parshvanath Digambar idol

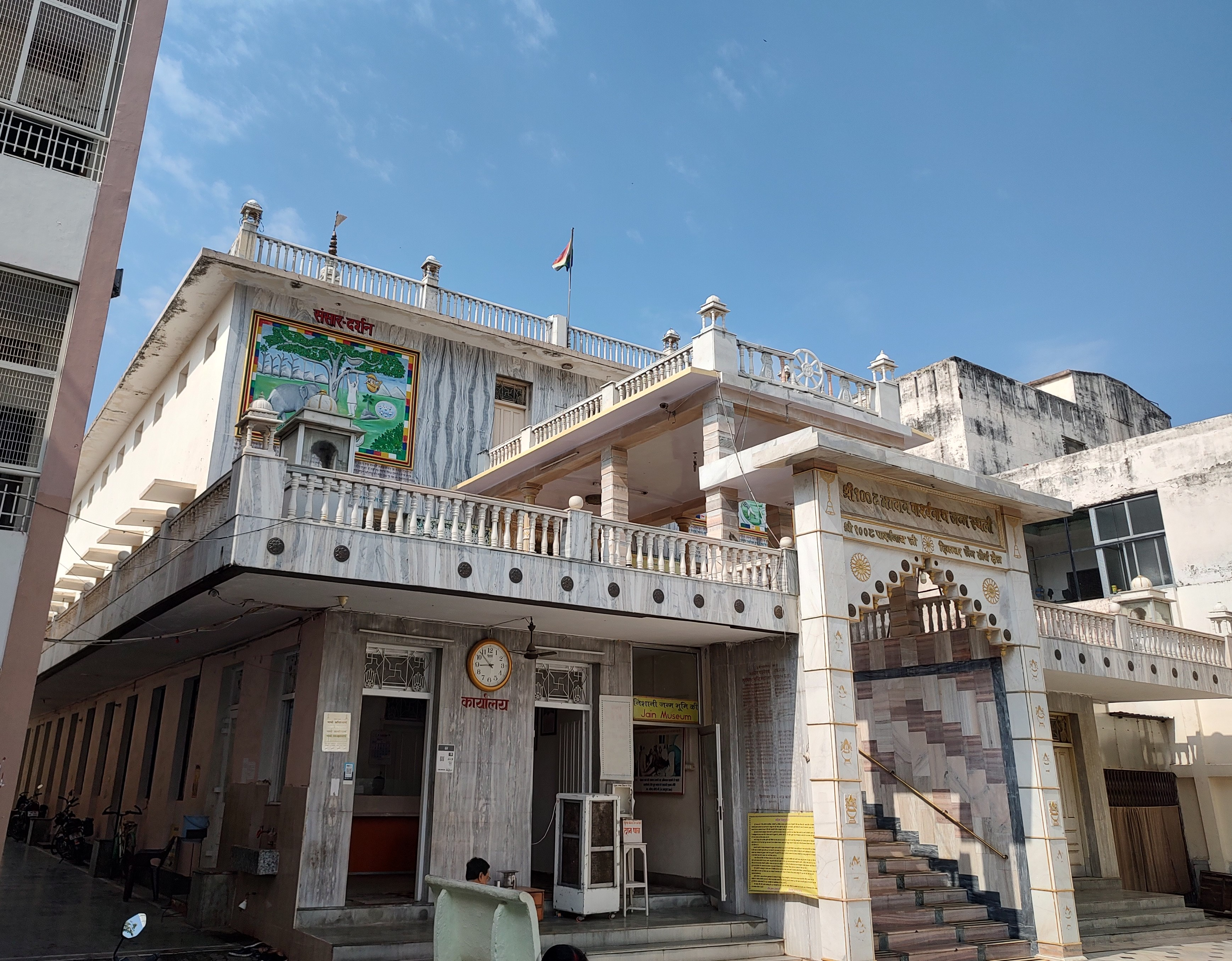
Parshvanath Digambar temple

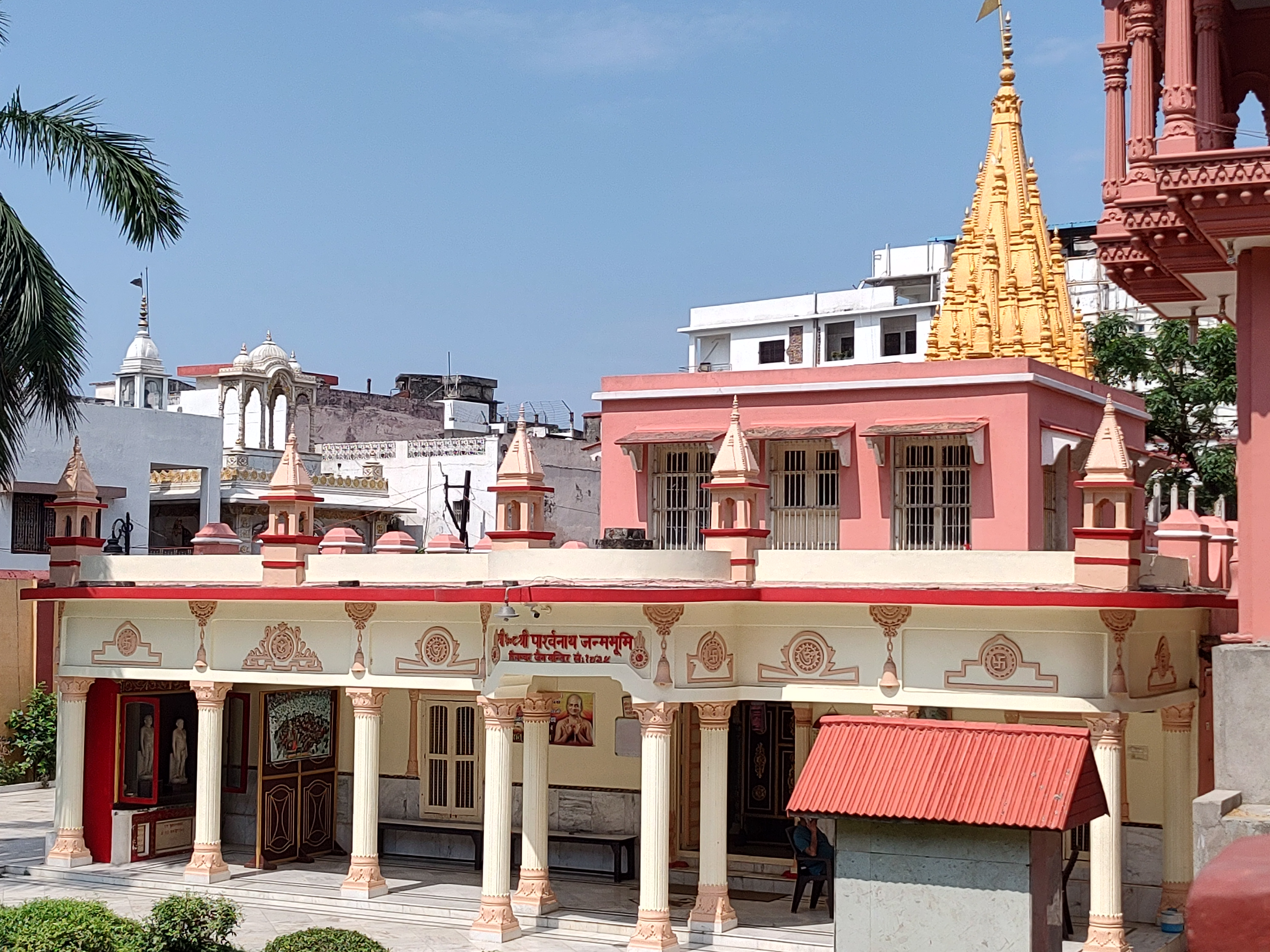
Parshvanath-Padmavati temple

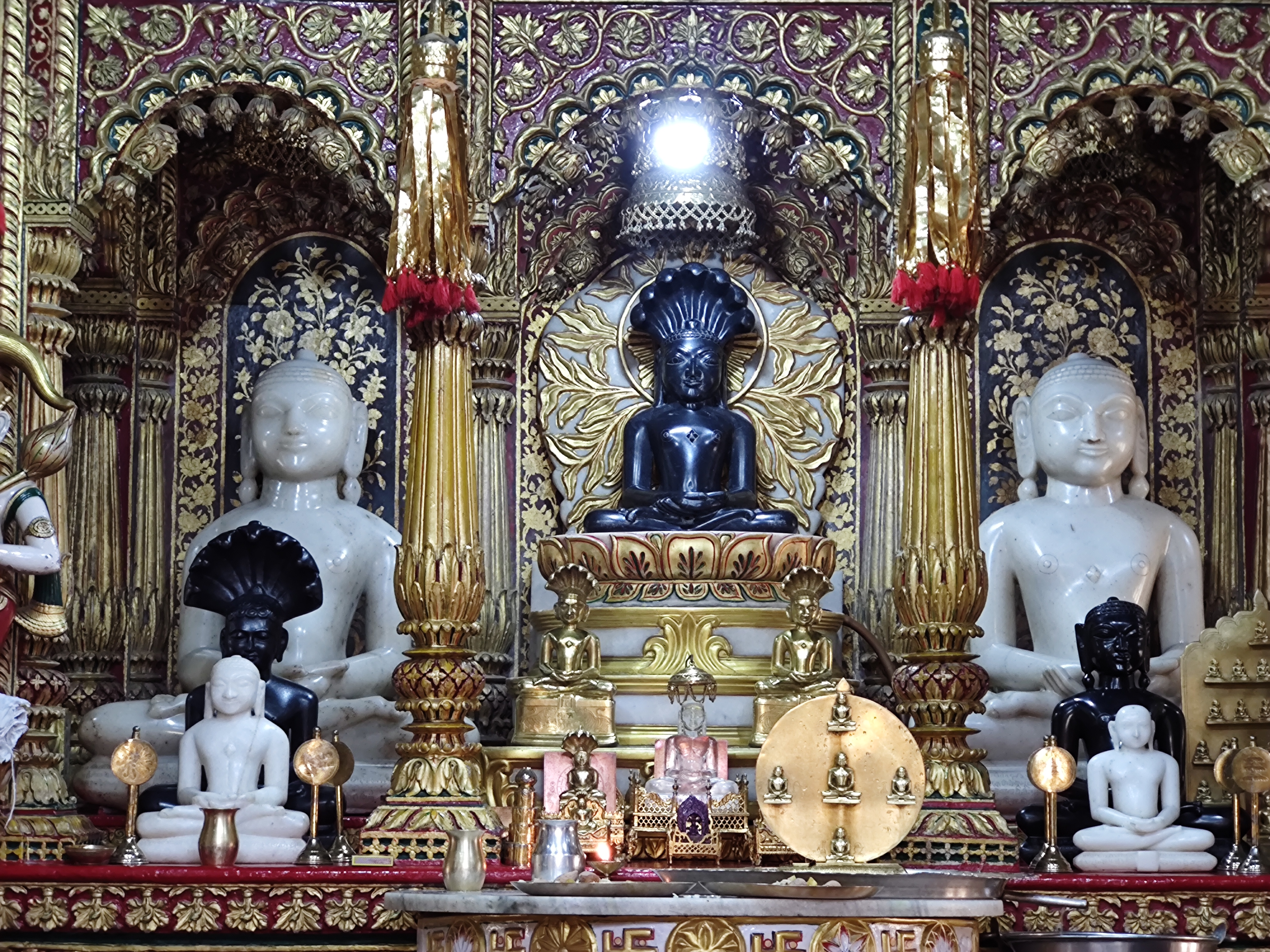
Main vedi inside Parshvanath-Padmavati temple

== See also ==
- Chandrawati Jain temple
- Sarnath Jain Tirth
- Hastinapur

== Bibliography ==
- Cort, John E. (2001). Jains in the World : Religious Values and Ideology in India. Oxford University Press. ISBN 978-0-19-513234-2.
- Dodson, Michael S. (2021). Banaras: Urban Forms and Cultural Histories. Taylor & Francis. ISBN 9781000365641.
- Eck, Diana L. (5 June 2013). Banaras: CITY OF LIGHT. Knopf Doubleday Publishing Group. ISBN 9780307832955.
- Raychaudhuri, Hemchandra (1953). Political History of Ancient India: From the Accession of Parikshit to the Extinction of Gupta Dynasty. University of Calcutta.
- Singh, Rana (2009), Banaras: Making of India's Heritage City, Planet Earth & Cultural Understanding, Cambridge Scholars Publishing, ISBN 9781443815796
- Singh, Sarina (2010). India. Lonely Planet. ISBN 978-1-74179-151-8.
- Balgoori, Raju (2013). "Jaina Culture In Karimnagar District, Telengana - A Study". Indian History Congress. 74: 167–77. JSTOR 44158813.
- Singh, Binay (25 August 2015). "4 Jain Tirthankaras born in Varanasi".
- "Jain shrines". Uttar Pradesh Tourism. Archived from the original on 25 September 2020.
