= Rajbali Pandey =

Indian author

Dr. Raj Bali Pandey राजबली पाण्डेय
- Born: 7 May 1907; Village Karauni, Rudrapur, United Provinces of Agra and Oudh
- Died: 6 June 1971 (aged 64); Varanasi, India
- Resting place: Varanasi, India
- Citizenship: India
- Education: B.A. (hons. in Sanskrit) (1931); M.A. (1933); D.Litt (1936)
- Alma mater: Faculty of Arts, Banaras Hindu University
- Years active: 1930–71

RajBali Pandey (Hindi: राजबली पाण्डेय) was an Indian writer and author who authored several books on Socio-Religious study of the Hindu sacraments and Vedas.

== Career ==
Dr. Raj Bali Pandey started his career as editor of "Kalyan", published by Geeta Press and also as tutor of Ramabai, daughter of Ramkrishna Dalmia. He got appointment in Banaras Hindu University in 1936 by Mahamana Pandit Madan Mohan Malaviya. He got promoted as Reader by the then Vice-Chancellor Dr. Sarvepalli Radhakrishnan. He was appointed as Head & Principal, College of Indology (Bharati Mahavidyalaya) in 1952.

Due to political pressure he left the B.H.U and joined Rani Durgavati University (Jabalpur University) as Professor and Head, department of Ancient Indian History, Culture & Archeology. In 1967, he became the Vice-Chancellor of Jabalpur University and worked till his death as Vice-Chancellor.

=== Academic Posts Held ===
1. Assistant professor, B.H.U (1936 - 1946).
2. Professor, B.H.U (1946 - 1952).
3. University Professor, B.H.U. (1952 - 1960).
4. Principal, College of Indology (1952 - 1960).
5. Malviya Professor of Ancient Indian History and Culture, Rani Durgavati University (1961).
6. Vice-Chancellor, Rani Durgavati University (1968).

== Publications ==
- Hindu Samskaras: ISBN 978-8120803961
- Atharvaveda: ISBN 978-8120803961
- Pocket Guide to Popular Hinduism: ISBN 8173032300
- Rigveda: ISBN 978-8189182632
- Samveda: ISBN 978-8128801464
- Yajurveda: ISBN 979-8189182648
- Pracheen Bharat: ISBN 9788171241293
- Bhartiya Puralipi: ISBN 9788180315763
- Vikramaditya of Ujjaini
- Vikramaditya Samvat Pravartak
- Chandragupta II Vikramāditya
- Bhartiya Itihās ki Bhumika
- Bhartiya Itihās ka Parichaya
- Indian Paleography
- Ashok ke Abhilekh
- Historical and Literary Inscriptions
- Bhāratīya nīti kā vikāsa
- Varanasi, the heart of Hinduism
- Hindu Dharma-Kosh: ISBN 9789382175315
- Svargīya Padmabhūshaṇa Paṇḍita Kuñjīlāla Dube smr̥ti-grantha
- Hindī sāhitya kā br̥hat itihāsa
- Popular Hinduism at a glance
- Gorakhpur Janpad aur uski kshatriya jātiyon kā itihās

== See also ==
- Faculty of Arts, Banaras Hindu University
- Banaras Hindu University
