= Jotin Bhattacharya =

Jotin Bhattacharya ज्योतिन भट्टाचार्य
- Also known as: Jyotin Bhattacharya
- Born: Jotin Bhattacharya; 1 January 1926; Varanasi, Uttar Pradesh
- Origin: India
- Died: 22 February 2016 (aged 90) Varanasi
- Genre: Indian classical music
- Occupation: Sarod player
- Instrument: Sarod

Jotin Bhattacharya (Hindi: ज्योतिन भट्टाचार्य) was an Indian classical sarod player. Jyotin was a disciple of Allauddin Khan.

== Early life and education ==
Bhattacharya was born in 1926 in Varanasi in a Bengali family. He attended C.M. Anglo Bengali College and subsequently attained bachelor's, master's and MPhil degrees from the Benaras Hindu University before starting his eight-year music training from Allauddin Khan. During his training under Allauddin Khan, Bhattacharya also served him as a secretary and handled all his correspondences.

Bhattacharya performed at the Baba Allauddin Khan Music Foundation in the Poorva Sanskritik Kendra, Laxmi Nagar, Delhi.

== Album ==
In 1974, His Master's Voice released Bhattacharya's first album, Sarod, in LP record format.

== Books ==
Bhattacharya wrote three books (all about Allauddin Khan).

#	Title	Year	Language	Pages	About	Comments
1	Ustad Allauddin Khan and His Music	1979	English	242	Biography of Baba Allauddin	
2	Allaudin Khan O aamara	-	Bengali	1,050	On the life and work of Baba Allauddin	
3	Allaudin Khan and us	-	Hindi	-	-	

== See also ==
- Sarod
- Baba Allauddin Khan
