= National Mission for Manuscripts =

Indian government agency

- Formation: 7 February 2003
- Headquarters: 11, Mansingh Road, New Delhi - 110001
- Parent organisation: Ministry of Culture, Government of India
- Website: Official Website

The National Mission for Manuscripts (NAMAMI) is an autonomous organisation under Ministry of Culture, Government of India, established to survey, locate and conserve Indian manuscripts, with an aim to create national resource base for manuscripts, for enhancing their access, awareness and use for educational purposes. The Mission was initiated in February 2003, by the Ministry of Tourism and Culture, Government of India and Indira Gandhi National Centre for the Arts is the nodal agency for the execution of this project. It creates bibliographic databases of Indian manuscripts and is involved in the conservation and preservation of the manuscripts.

== Overview ==
The organisation works in the field of restoration and conservation Indian manuscripts, and their digitisation, to promote access and scholarship through research and publication. It has also established a national network of institutions and manuscript repositories, including Manuscript Resource Centres (MRC-s), Manuscript Conservation Centres (MCC-s), Manuscript Partner Centres (MPC-s) and Manuscript Conservation Partner Centres (MCPC-s), spread across the nation. It has also established Kritisampada, the National Database of Manuscripts, a digital archive at its website.

The Mission also got a Rigveda manuscripts preserved at the Bhandarkar Oriental Research Institute, Pune, where it runs a 'Manuscripts Resource and Conservation Centre', included in UNESCO’S, Memory of the World Register in 2007. In October 2010, the Sayaji Rao Gaekwad Library (Central Library), BHU in association with the Mission, held a national workshop on manuscript conservation at the library.

== Manuscript Conservation Centres ==
The Mission runs a network of 32 conservation units across the India, known as Manuscript Conservation Centres (MCCs), divided according to geographical zones.

=== North ===
- Central Institute of Buddhist Studies, Leh
- Indira Gandhi National Centre for the Arts, New Delhi
- Department of Language and Culture, Shimla
- The Himalayan Society for Heritage and Art Conservation, Nainital
- Vrindavan Research Institute, Vrindavan
- Rampur Raza Library, Rampur
- Nagarjuna Buddhist Foundation, Gorakhpur
- Indian Conservation Institute, Lucknow
- Visweshvarananda Biswabandhu Institute of Sanskrit and Indological Studies, Hoshiarpur
- Central Library, Banaras Hindu University, Banaras

=== South ===
- Oriental Research Institute, Sri Venkateswara University, Tirupati
- Salar Jung Museum, Hyderabad, Telangana
- INTACH Chitrakala Parishath Art Conservation Centre, Bangalore, Karnataka
- Tamil Nadu Government Museum, Chennai, Tamil Nadu
- Karnataka State Archives, Bangalore, Karnataka
- Tanjore Maharaja Serfoji's Saraswati Mahal Library, Thanjavur, Tamil Nadu
- Centre for Heritage Studies Hill Palace Museum, Thripunithura, Kerala
- Regional Conservation Laboratory, Thiruvananthapuram, Kerala
- State Archives and Research Institute, Hyderabad, Telangana

=== East ===
- Khuda Bakhsh Oriental Public Library, Patna
- Sarasvati, Bhadrak
- Sri Dev Kumar Jain Oriental research Institute, Arrah
- Manuscript Library, University of Calcutta, Kolkata, West Bengal
- INTACH Orissa Art Conservation Centre, Bhubaneswar, Odisha
- AITIHYA, Bhubaneswar, Odisha
- Sambalpur University, Burla, Odisha
- Krishna Kanta Handiqui Library, Gauhati University, Guwahati, Assam
- Manipur State Archives, Imphal, Manipur
- Tawang Monastery, Tawang, Arunachal Pradesh

=== West ===
- Rajasthan Oriental Research Institute, Jodhpur
- Mahaveer Digamber Jain Pandulipi Samrakshan Kendra, Jaipur, Rajasthan
- Lalbhai Dalpatbhai Institute of Indology, Ahmedabad, Gujarat
- Bhandarkar Oriental Research Institute (BORI), Pune, Maharashtra

=== Central ===
- Scindia Oriental Research Institute (SORI), Ujjain

== Manuscript Studies ==
- Basic Level Courses on Manuscriptology and Palaeography
- Advanced Level Workshop on Manuscriptology and Palaeography
- Research Fellowships (Gurukula Fellowships)
