= C.M. Anglo Bengali College =

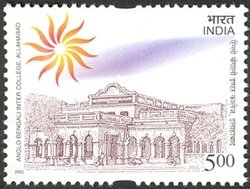

Location
- Varanasi, Uttar Pradesh; India
- Coordinates: 25.302083°N 82.998844°E

Information
- Type: Intermediate College
- Motto: Truth, Service
- Established: 1 April 1898
- School district: Varanasi
- Principal: Anurag Mishra
- Grades: Percentage System
- Website: anglobengali.com

C.M. Anglo Bengali College also known as C.M. Anglo Bengali Inter College or as Anglo Bengali College is a boys' school in Bhelupur, Varanasi, India. It was established in 1898 by Chintamani Mukherjee.

== History ==
C.M. Anglo Bengali College was established by Chintamani Mukherjee in the year 1898. The intermediate college is affiliated with U.P. Board and offers education under the 10+2 education system. School campus is situated in Bhelupur, a southern suburb of Varanasi.

== Noted alumni ==
- Hemanta Kumar Mukhopadhyay: Singer, composer / music director and film producer
- Jotin Bhattacharya: Sarod Player
- Ram Naresh Yadav: Ex. Chief Minister of Uttar Pradesh
- Subrata Roy: Indian businessman and the founder and chairman of Indian conglomerate Sahara India
- Nivaan Sen: An Indian Actor and Producer Actor

== See also ==
- List of educational institutions in Varanasi
