= Kaushalendra Singh =

Indian politician

Mayor of Varanasi
- In office 2006–2012
- Succeeded by: Ram Gopal Mohley

Personal details
- Born: 1 July 1976 (age 50) Varanasi, Uttar Pradesh
- Citizenship: Indian
- Parent: Rajbali Singh (father)
- Education: (M.Com) Banaras Hindu University; Central Hindu Boys School
- Occupation: Businessperson, Politician

Kaushalendra Singh (born 1 July 1974) is an Indian Politician and former mayor of Varanasi. Singh is a member of the Bharatiya Janata Party (BJP).

== Early life ==
Singh was born in Mirzapur district in 1976. He completed his secondary education at Central Hindu Boys School and then attended the Faculty of Commerce at the Banaras Hindu University, being awarded a master's degree in commerce.

== Political career ==
Singh is a member of the BJP and was elected mayor of Varanasi in 2006 and remained in office till 2012.
