= Mandagere Subbarao Krishnamurthy =

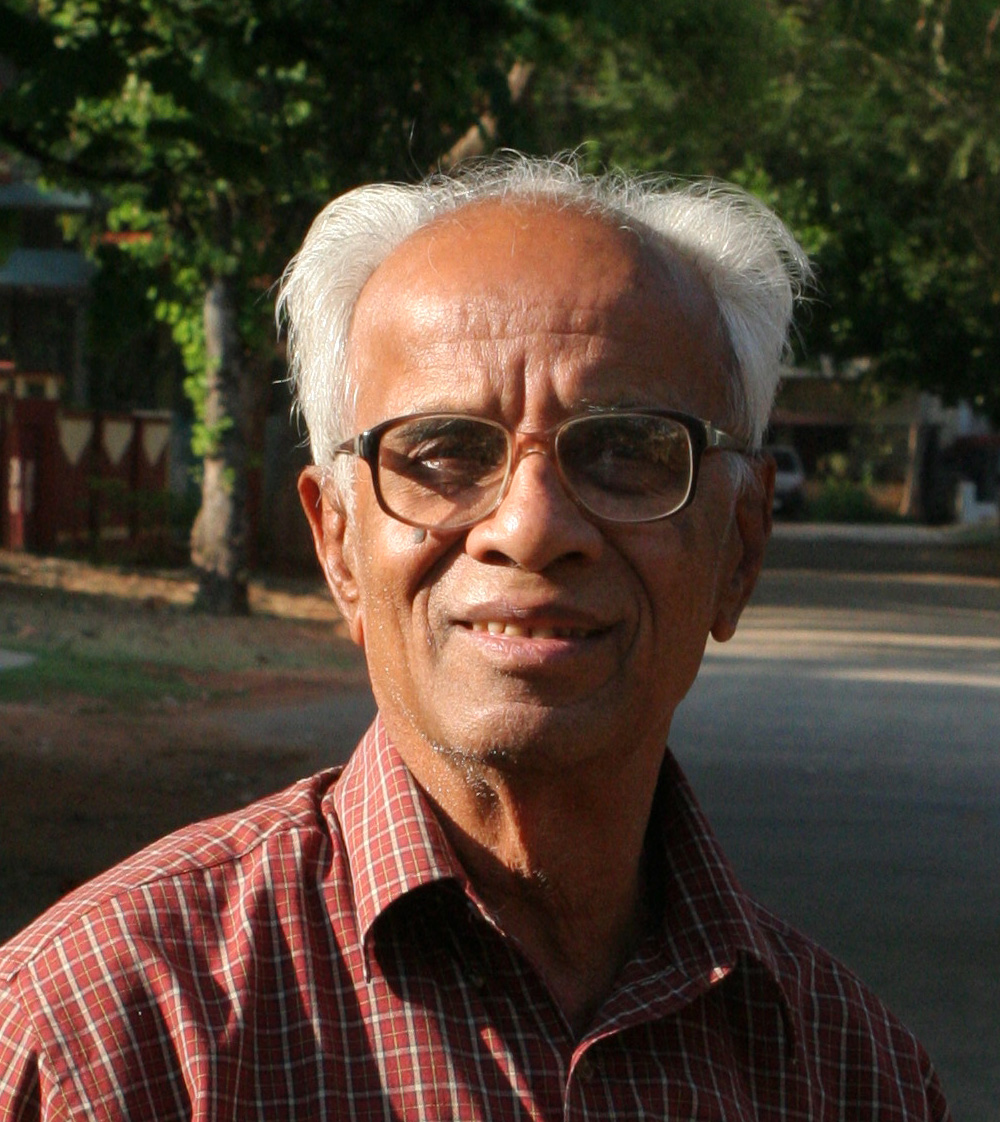
- Ma Su Krishnamurthy
- Born: 16 June 1931 (age 95); Mandagere, Mandya district, Karnataka
- Occupations: Writer, novelist, professor
- Writing career
- Pen name: Indiresh, Ma Su Krishnamurthy
- Genres: Fiction, non-fiction

Mandagere Subbarao Krishnamurthy (born 16 June 1931), known by the pen name Indiresh or Ma Su Krishnamurthy, is an Indian Kannada writer and Hindi writer.

He was conferred the Tamra Patra award by former President of India, Shankar Dayal Sharma in recognition of his literary work in Hindi.

== Biography ==
=== Early life and education ===
Krishnamurthy was born in Mandagere, of Mandya district in Karnataka State to a native Kannada family. His education began in Mandagere. He moved to Mysore for further studies and completed his Master of Arts (M.A.) in Kannada from Mysore University in 1958. He continued his studies in Banaras Hindu University and earned his M.A. in Hindi in 1962. He then moved to Mysore to pursue further studies and earned his PhD in Hindi from Mysore University in 1966. He currently lives in Mysore with his wife Indira Krishnamurthy.

=== Career ===
Krishnamurthy began his academic career as a lecturer in Hindi at National College, Bangalore in 1967. He then moved to Mysore University and joined the Hindi Department. He served as a professor of Hindi and retired as the Head of the Hindi Department in the year 1991. He also served as the Hindi Advisory board member in the Health and Family Welfare Ministry in the Indian Government from 1988 to 1991.

== Awards ==
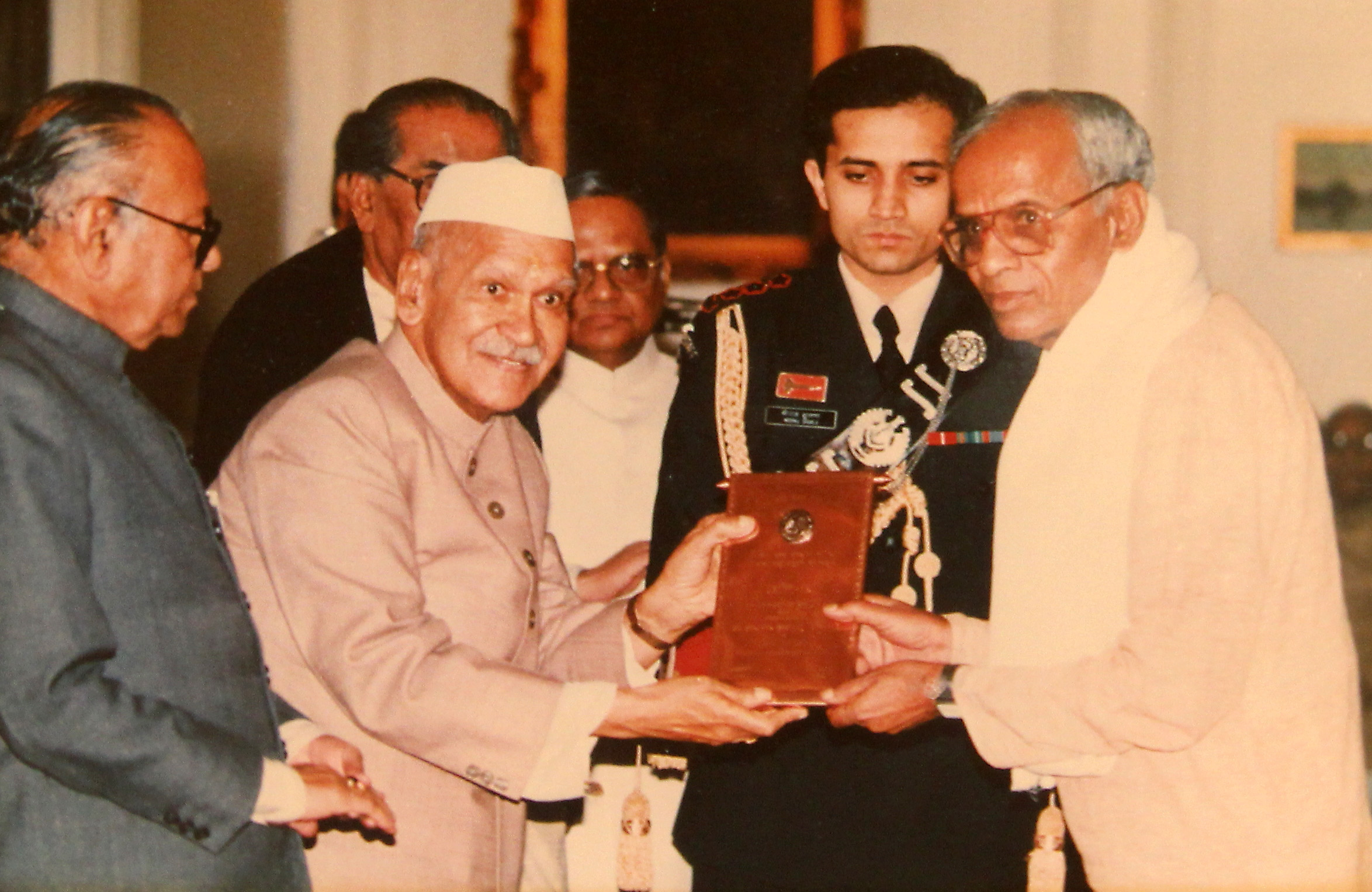
Ma Su Krishnamurthy being awarded the Tamra Patra by President Shankar Dayal Sharma

- Tamra Patra, Awarded by the Government of India for literary work in Hindi
- Dakshina Kesari Sahitya Award for his literary work in Kannada – 2010
- Basavaraju Award for his literary work in Kannada – 2008
- Kuvempu Award, Karnataka Sangha, Shimoga – 2010
- Honored by the Kendriya Hindi Directorate 3 years in a row
- Babu Gangasharan Award, Kendriya Hindi Sansthan, Agra – 1996
- Ananda Rushi Award, Hyderabad – 1992
- Hindi Prathistan Award, Hyderabad – 1990
- Mahatma Gandhi Award, Bangalore University, Bangalore – 1990
- Reserve Bank of India Award – 2000
- Karnataka Rajya Sarkar Award
- Souhardha Sanman from Uttar Pradesh Government – 1999
- Rashtra Dharma Seva Sanman, Lucknow – 2008
- Karnataka Rajya Sahitya Academy Award two years in a row
- Nrupatunga Award – 2001
- Swarna Jayanthi Award, Mysore University – 1998
- Karnataka Vidya Vardhaka Sangha Award, Dharwad – 1998
- T. N. Sri. Award, Mysore University – 1980
- Hindi novel 'Aparajita' won the First place in the Central Hindi Directorate – 1973
- Hindi novel 'Raga Kanada' won the Mahatma Gandhi prize from the Bangalore University
- Hindi novel 'Parashuram Ki Behene' won the Central Hindi Directorate award – 1983
- Hindi novel 'Jyoti Kalash' won the Central Hindi Directorate award – 1988
- Honored by Government of Karnataka for all the literary work in Kannada

== Bibliography ==
=== Literary works ===
- 'Aranyak' original Hindi story collection (1994)
- 'Kavishree Kuvempu Kavishree Mala' (1962)
- 'Comparative study of the main trends in Hindi and Kannada literature'
- 'Samaradhana' a collection of research papers (1981)
- 'Kannada Sahitya Vahini' (Brief history of Kannada literature) – (1978)
- 'Sahitya Sandipani' (1978)
- 'Sahitya Sthaban' (1982)

=== Hindi to Kannada translations ===
- 'Banabhatta ki atmakatha' (Life story of Banabhatta) – (1956)
- 'Mrugayana'
- 'Jaya Somanath' (1962)
- 'Suraj ki Sathvaghada' (1970)
- 'Chidambara Sanehayan' (1974)
- 'Meghadhuth Ek Puranu Kahani' (1974)
- 'Anamadas Ka Potha' (1980)
- 'Komal Gandhar' (1985)
- 'Ramacharitha Manasa' (1990)
- 'Vinaya Pathika' (1999)
- 'Kabir Padavali' (2000)
- 'Bihari Sapthapadi' (1994)
- 'Meera Padavali' (2004)
- 'Sura Padavali' (2005)

=== Original works in Kannada ===
- 'Hindi Sahitya' (1976)
- 'Siddha Sahitya' (1981)
- 'Sufi Premakavya' (1991)
- 'Utharada Santha Parampare' (2003)
- 'Sufi Prema Darshan' (1998)
- 'Bihari' (1995)
- 'Surdas' (1973)
- 'Vidyapathi' (1983)

=== Original novels in Kannada ===
- 'Nadasethu' (1970)
- 'Khagayana' (1976)
- 'Hadagina Hakki' (1980)
- 'Parashuramana Thangiyaru' (1998)
- 'Kuri Sakida Thola' (1999)
- 'Kasturi Mruga' (2000)
- 'Chaturmuka' (2001)
- 'RathaChakra' (2004)
- 'Onti Salaga' (2003)
- 'Phalguni' (2004)

=== Collection of stories ===
- 'Bettakke Chaliyadare' (2002)
- 'Punargamana' (2002)

=== Collection of essays ===
- 'Gandhamadana' (1973)
- 'Chankramana' (1978)
- 'Chaitraratha' (1986)
- 'Hadipurana' (1981)
- 'Ekantha Sangeetha' (1999)
- 'Kirthirag' (1998)
- 'Girikarnika' (2000)
- 'Deepamale' (2004)

=== Sketches ===
- 'Chitta Bittiya Chitragalu' (1998)
- 'Gopurada Deepa' (1995)
- 'Santha Narasi Mahta' (2002)
- 'Vyomakeshana Vachanagalu' (2000)
- 'Samudra Sangama' (2001)

=== Dramas ===
- 'Yuganta'
- 'Ratna Kankana' (2003)

=== Criticism ===
- 'Seemollangana' (2000)
- 'Sethu Bandhana' (2001)
- 'Parishodhana' (2002)

=== Children's novels ===
- 'Meera Bai' (1973)
- 'Santha Rai Das' (1988)
- 'Maharshi Karve'
- 'Kitturu Rani Chennamma'
- 'Kogileya Chikkavva'
- 'Chandamamana Aliya'
- 'Menasina Kayiya Sahasa'
- 'Kaluvgala Jagala'
- 'Gora Badal'
- 'Chitra Pallava'

=== Poems ===
- 'Anantha Yatre' (2006)

=== Edited ===
- 'Nalachampa' (1971)
