= Central Hindu Girls School =

Location
- Gurubagh; Bhelupur; Varanasi, Uttar Pradesh, 221001; India
- Coordinates: 25.307517°N 82.995115°E

Information
- School type: Government Secondary school
- Mottoes: Knowledge imparts immortality
- Founded: 1 July 1904
- Founder: Dr. Annie Besant
- Status: Open
- Sister school: Central Hindu Boys School
- School board: CBSE
- Principal: Abha Agrawal
- Teaching staff: ~55
- Grades: Percentage System
- Gender: Girls
- Enrolment: 1,780
  - Pre-kindergarten: 120 (in 3 sections)
  - Kindergarten: 80 (in 2 sections)
  - Grade 1: 80 (in 2 sections)
  - Grade 2: 80 (in 2 sections)
  - Grade 3: 80 (in 2 sections)
  - Grade 4: 120 (in 3 sections)
  - Grade 5: 120 (in 3 sections)
  - Grade 6: 120 (in 3 sections)
  - Grade 7: 120 (in 3 sections)
  - Grade 8: 120 (in 3 sections)
  - Grade 9: 120 (in 3 sections)
  - Grade 10: 120 (in 3 sections)
  - Grade 11: 250 (in 5 sections)
  - Grade 12: 250 (in 5 sections)
- Classes: PK to XII
- Average class size: 42
- Education system: Secondary school
- Language: English & Hindi
- Hours in school day: 6
- Classrooms: 44
- Campus size: 6.5 acres
- Campus type: Urban
- Nickname: CHGS
- Affiliation: CBSE
- Last updated: 21 July 2015

Central Hindu Girls School, also known as C.H.G.S and Girls School, is a girls secondary school (day school) in Gurubagh, Bhelupur, Varanasi (India). It was established in 1904 by Dr. Annie Besant.

Central Hindu Girls School (CHGS) is now an integral part of Banaras Hindu University and one of the oldest institutions for girls' education in the city. The school is 117 years old. Nursery and Primary Section(class I to V) has a separate co-ed campus in kolhua. After that, from class 6th onwards, the girls are separately taught in the Central Hindu Girls School, Kamachha Varanasi.

== History ==
Central Hindu Girls School was established in 1904 by Dr. Annie Besant. Initially the school was called Kanya Vidyalaya. In 1915, along with Central Hindu Boys School, the Girls school was also handed over to the Banaras Hindu University by Dr. Annie Besant. In 1976, the school adopted the 10+2 education system and also got affiliated with CBSE. The school is currently a part of the Banaras Hindu University and is governed by the University administration.

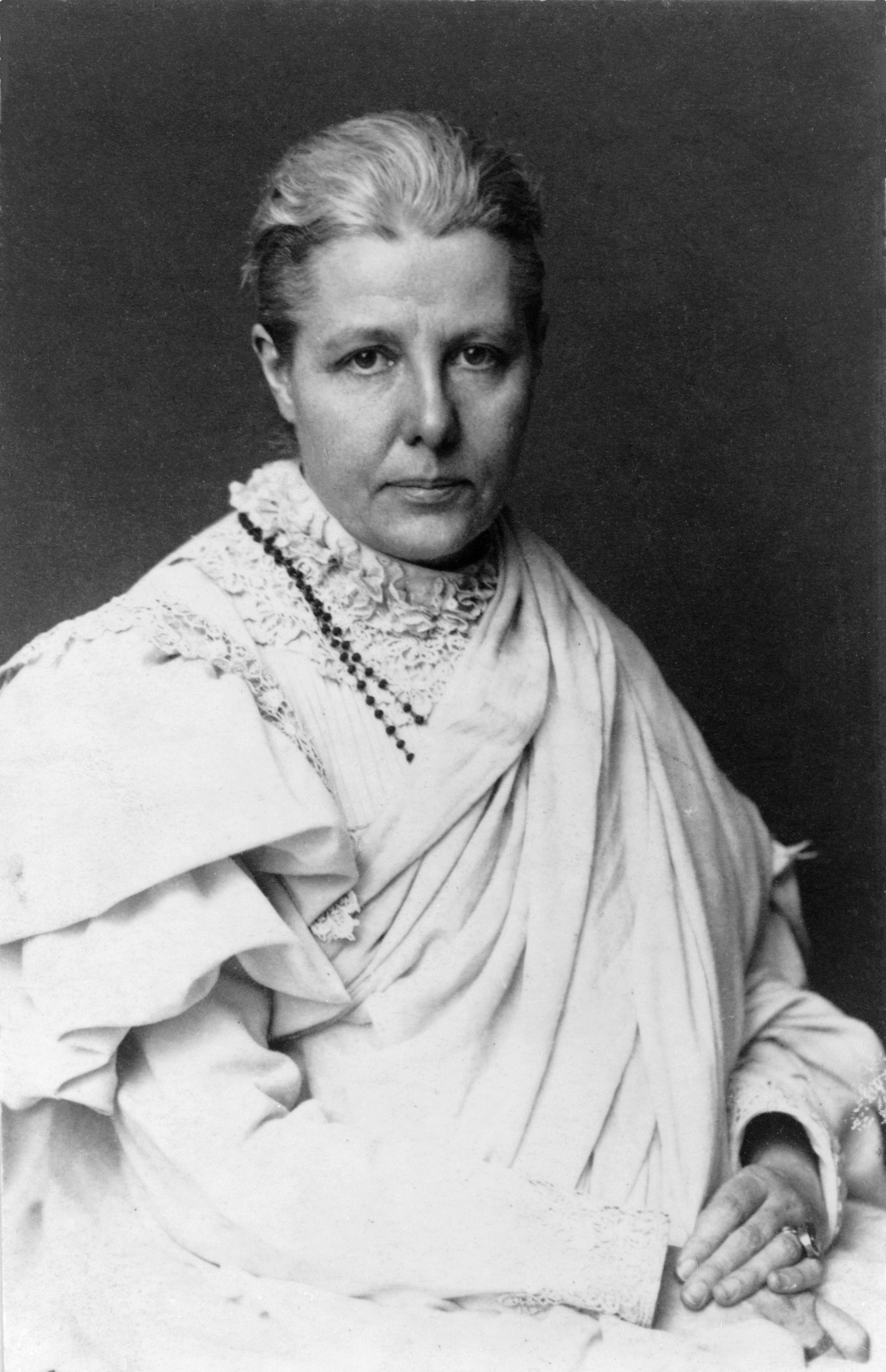
Annie Besant in 1897

== Campus ==
The Central Hindu Girls School's campus is split in two parts; for grades PK to V students (primary Section) in Kolhua and grades VI to XII (main campus) in Gurubag. Main campus is spread over 6.5 acres and houses the school, laboratories (Physics, Chemistry, Biology, Mathematics, Computer, Psychology, painting and Home science) and library. School library has more than 16,000 publications. School has 44 classrooms and also houses several halls and playgrounds.

Classes from grades PK to fifth grades are held in the Kolhua campus under co-ed arrangement. From VI to XII, the students are segregated for further education in Central Hindu Girls School and Central Hindu Boys School for girls and boys educations respectively.

== Academic programs ==
The schools offers education from PK to XII grades in English & Hindi medium. Till tenth grade, all students follow same curriculum with exception of optional subjects and medium of education; in grades XI and XII, students can opt between Science, Commerce and arts as main courses.

== Admissions ==
Admission in Primary Section is taken in class Nursery-A. Every year the admission procedure starts from 1 April. These admissions are made by lottery system, where minimum age for admission of a child is 3+.

The Admission in Senior Sections of the school are made in classes VI, IX and XI through a common entrance test known as School Entrance Test (SET) conducted by the Banaras Hindu University every year. The eligibility and reservation policy is decided by the policy making bodies of the Banaras Hindu University.

== See also ==
- Banaras Hindu University
- List of educational institutions in Varanasi
