= Sayajirao Gaekwad Library =

Sayaji Rao Gaekwad Library (Central Library)
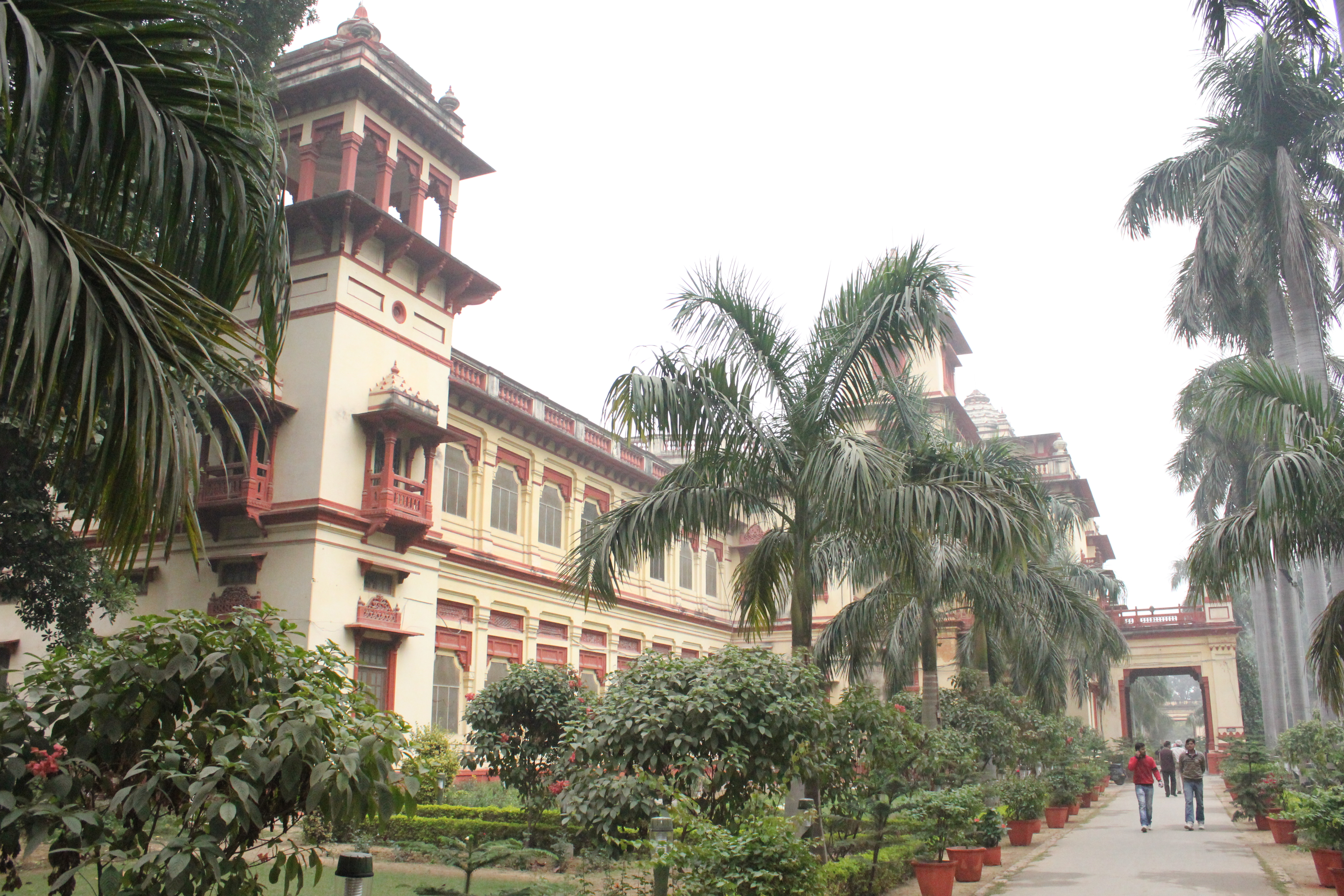
- Central Library in BHU
- Location: Banaras Hindu University (BHU), Varanasi, India
- Established: 1917

The Sayaji Rao Gaekwad Library, also known as the Central Library, is the main library of Banaras Hindu University (BHU) in Varanasi, Uttar Pradesh in India. Established in 1917, it is listed in the Survey of Manuscripts in India. The present building of the library was built in 1941 on pattern of British Museum, at the suggestion of Pandit Madan Mohan Malaviya, the founder of university, after his return from the Round Table Conference, London in 1931, with a donation from the Sayajirao Gaekwad III, Maharaja of Baroda State from 1875 to 1939, known for establishing libraries throughout his state.

It is also a designated 'Manuscript Conservation Centre' (MCC) under the National Mission for Manuscripts established in 2003.

== History ==
The Banaras Hindu University Library system was established from a collection donated by Prof. P.K. Telang in the memory of his father Justice Kashinath Trimbak Telang in 1917. The collection was housed in the Telang Hall of the Central Hindu College, Kamachha. In 1921, the library was moved to the Central Hall of the Arts College (now Faculty of Arts) and then in 1941 to its present building. The library was established with the donation from Maharaja Sayajirao Gaekwad III of Baroda, on the pattern of the library British Museum in London on the suggestion of Pandit Madan Mohan Malaviya, the founder of university.

The library had a collection of around 60,000 volumes in 1931, through donations from various sources. The trend of donation of personal and family collection to the library continued as late as the 1940s with the result that it has unique pieces of rarities of books and journals dating back to 18th century; this includes donations of personal and family collections from Lala Sri Ram of Delhi, Jamnalal Bajaj of Wardha, Roormal Goenka, Batuk Nath Sharma, Tagore family collection, Nehru Family collection.

The Banaras Hindu University Library System consists of Central Library at apex and 3 Institute Libraries, 8 Faculty Libraries, 25 Departmental Libraries, with a total collection of over 13 lakh volumes to serve the students, faculty members, researchers, technical staff of fourteen faculties consisting of 126 subject departments of the university.

Around 2009, optical fibre networking was done at the library, and in May 2009, 32,913 books were made available in e-form, along with 2,107 journals accessed through internet. The work of digitization of manuscripts at the Central Library has been completed by May 2010, and they were also made available online thereafter. Later in the year in October, a two-day national seminar was held at the library on 'Right to Information (RTI) and Libraries'.

In October 2010, the library in association with the National Manuscripts Mission, New Delhi, held a national workshop on manuscript conservation at the library.

== Collections ==
The manuscript collection contains many ancient texts.
