= Aagam Mandir, Tumkur =

Śvetāmbara Jain temple in Karnataka, India

Aagam Mandir
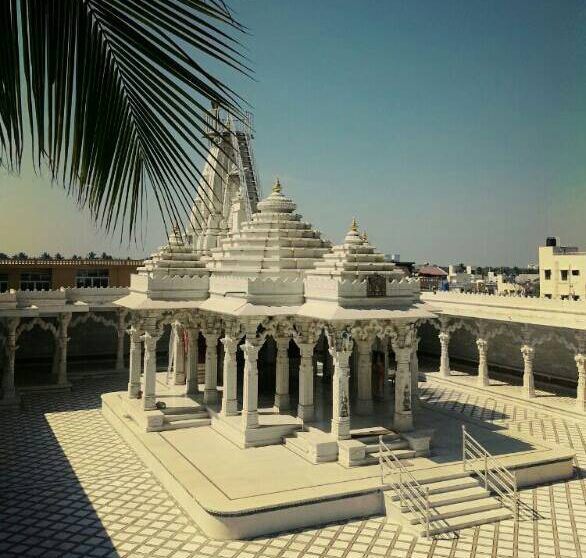
- Aagam Mandir

- Location within Karnataka

Religion
- Affiliation: Jainism
- Sect: Śvetāmbara
- Deity: Mahavira

Location
- Location: Tumkur, Karnataka, India
- Interactive map of Aagam Mandir
- Coordinates: 13.3676927°N 77.0999708°E

Architecture
- Temple: 1

Aagam Mandir (Aagam Temple) is a Śvetāmbara Jain temple in Tumakuru Karnataka. It is located 65 km from Bangalore, India, by road on Tumkur road. The nearest railway station is Tumkur (3.7 km).

== Main temple ==
This is Śvetāmbara Jain temple established by preceptors of the Sagar Samudaay, including Daulatsagarsuri, of the Śvetāmbara sect. The principal deity of this temple is Mahaveer Swami, 24th tirthankara of Jainism

== See also ==
- Mandaragiri
- Kulpakji
- Palitana temples
