= Chandrawati Jain temple =

Jain pilgrimage site in Uttar Pradesh, India

- चंद्रावती मंदिर
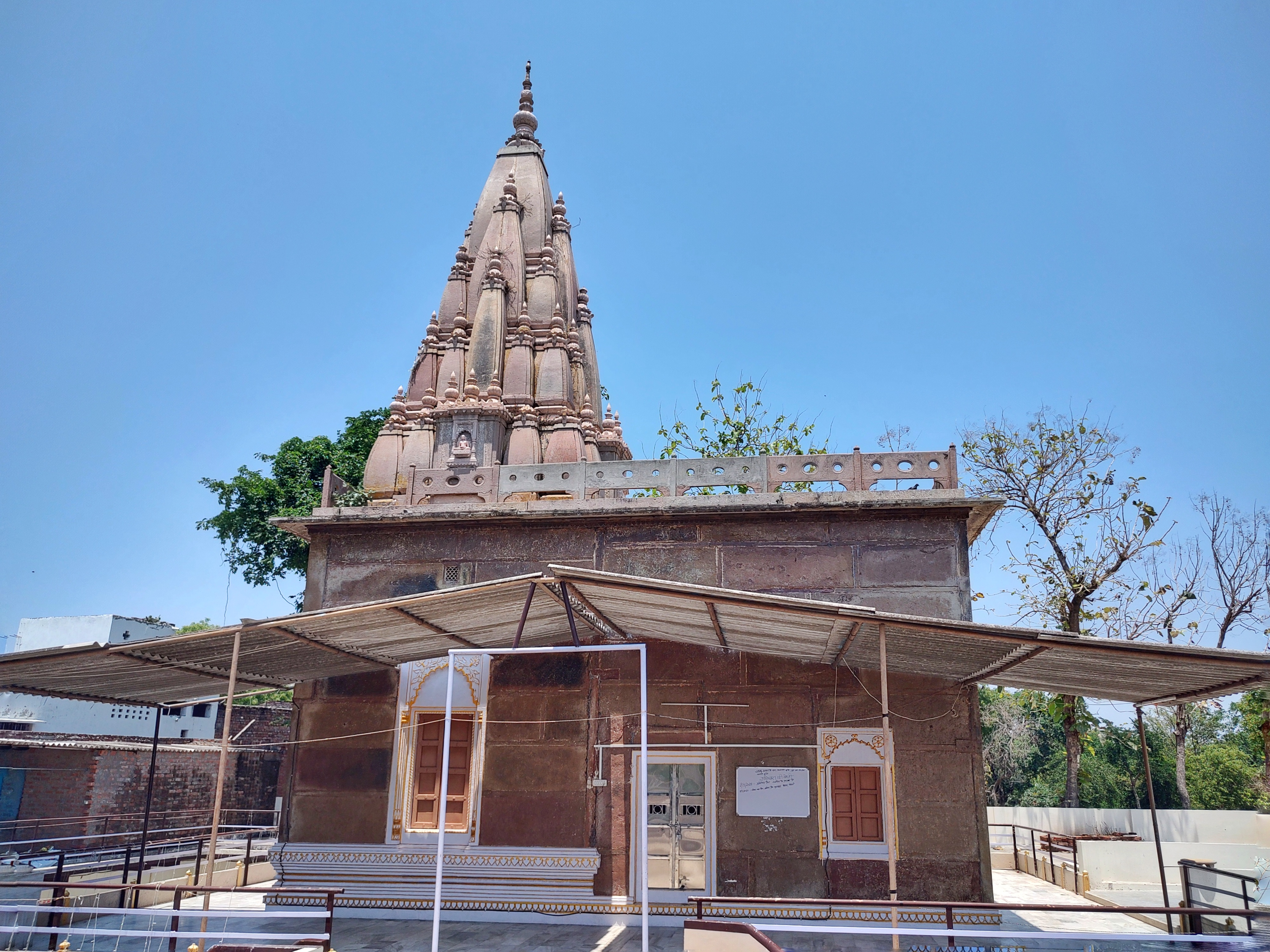
- Chandrawati digambar temple

- Location within Uttar Pradesh

Religion
- Affiliation: Jainism
- Sect: Digambara, Śvētāmbara
- Deity: Chandraprabha
- Festival: Mahavir Jayanti

Location
- Location: Chandrawati village, Varanasi, Uttar Pradesh
- Coordinates: 25°27′56.1″N 83°07′46.7″E

Architecture
- Temple: 2

Chandrawati Jain temple is a Jain pilgrimage site in Chandrawati village in Varanasi district, Uttar Pradesh, India, about 23 kilometres (14 mi) from Varanasi. The site is traditionally associated with Chandraprabha, the eighth Tirthankara of Jainism, and is regarded in Jain tradition as the location of three of his kalyanakas.

Archaeological investigations have established that Chandrawati occupies an ancient settlement on the left bank of the Ganges, near its confluence with the Gomti River. The archaeological remains include ruined fortifications, pottery, bricks and evidence of Jain religious structures.

== History ==
According to local tradition, the establishment of Chandrawati is attributed to a ruler named Domana Deva. Alexander Cunningham's Archaeological Survey of India records describe Chandrawati, also rendered Chandraoti, as an ancient settlement situated on the left bank of the Ganges, approximately three miles south of the confluence of the Gomti. The ancient settlement was enclosed by ruined ramparts surrounding the later village and contained large quantities of old bricks and pottery.

In 1877, archaeologist A. C. L. Carlleyle investigated the site and reported remains associated with three Jain temples. The Archaeological Survey described the three Jain temples then standing at Chandrawati as relatively plain structures and noted that the site was well known among Jain śrāvakas.

The architectural remains discovered at the site have been attributed to the ninth and tenth centuries. Sculptural remains and copper-plate inscriptions recovered from Chandrawati were subsequently preserved at the State Museum Lucknow. Epigraphical evidence indicates continuing patronage of religious establishments at Chandrawati during the Gahadavala period. An inscription dated to 1091 CE records grants made during the reign of Chandradeva, the founder of the Gahadavala dynasty.

== Archaeological site ==
The historic settlement extended beyond the area occupied by the present Jain temples. The Archaeological Survey recorded ruined ramparts enclosing the village and widespread remains of bricks and pottery across the ancient site. The location of the settlement on the bank of the Ganges, close to the confluence with the Gomti, places Chandrawati within the historic riverine landscape surrounding Varanasi. Nineteenth-century archaeological observations are particularly important for reconstructing the Jain history of Chandrawati because they document three Jain temples at the site before the development of the present pilgrimage complex.

== Temple complex ==
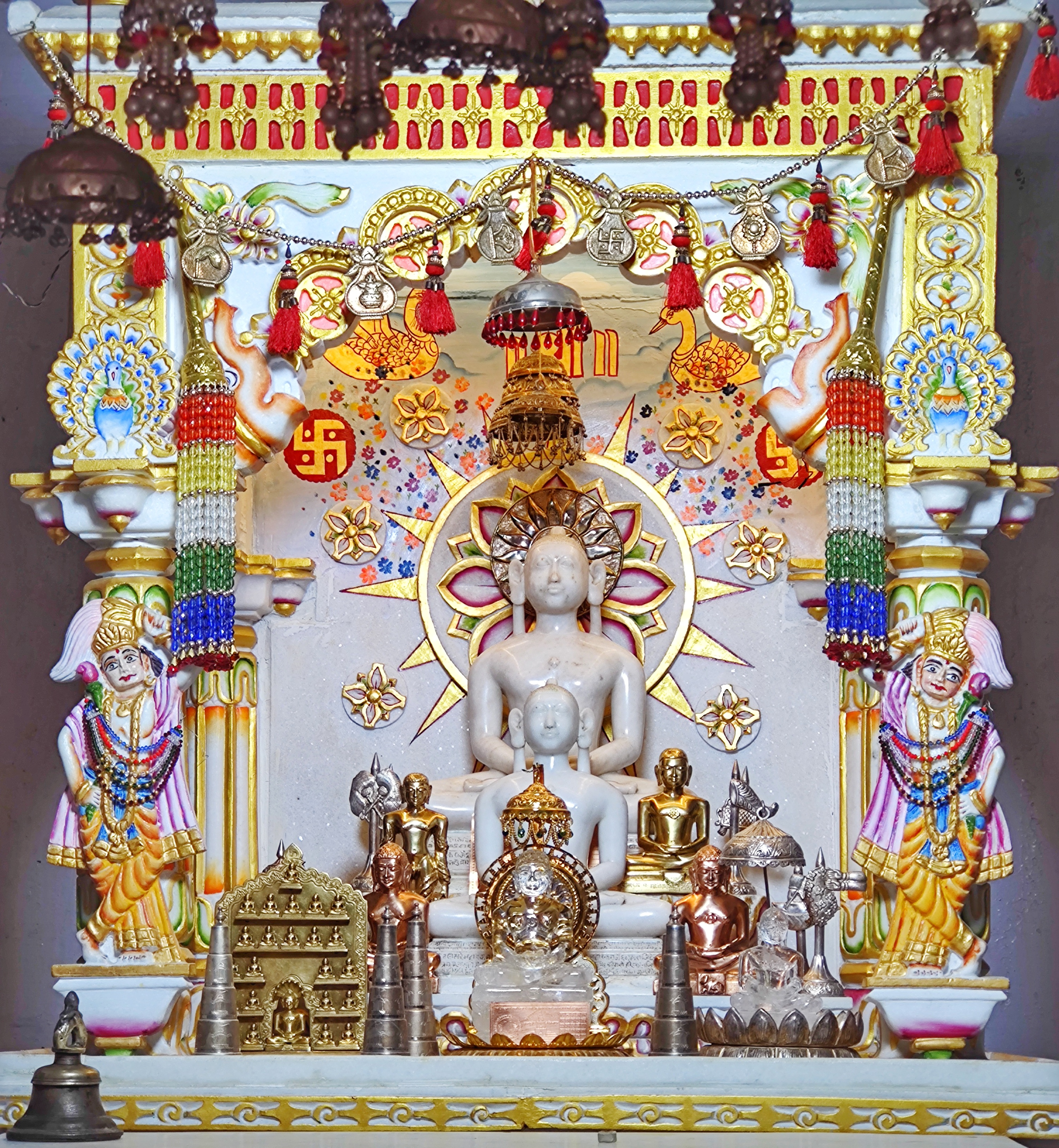
Main vedi

There are presently two principal Jain temples at Chandrawati, belonging respectively to the Digambara and Śvētāmbara traditions. Both are associated with Chandraprabha, the eighth Tirthankara.The present temples should be distinguished from the three Jain structures documented by nineteenth-century archaeological surveys. The surviving pilgrimage complex has undergone subsequent construction and renovation, while archaeological remains from the earlier settlement are preserved separately.

=== Digambara temple ===
The Digambara temple is dedicated to Chandraprabha and serves the Digambara Jain community. The principal vedi contains an image of Chandraprabha, reflecting the site's traditional association with the Tirthankara.

=== Śvētāmbara temple ===
A separate Śvētāmbara Jain temple dedicated to Chandraprabha stands at Chandrawati. The existence of separate Digambara and Śvētāmbara temples makes Chandrawati a pilgrimage centre shared by both major Jain traditions.

== Religious significance ==
In Jain tradition, Chandrawati is associated with Chandraprabha, the eighth Tirthankara. It is regarded as the location of three of the five auspicious events (kalyanakas) in the life of Chandraprabha. Chandrawati forms part of a wider group of Jain pilgrimage sites in the Varanasi region associated with the lives of the Tirthankaras. Varanasi and its surroundings are traditionally associated with the birthplaces of Suparshvanatha, Chandraprabha, Shreyansanatha and Parshvanatha.

The site continues to attract Jain pilgrims. In 2023, plans were announced for the construction of an additional ghat at Chandrawati to provide improved facilities for pilgrims.

== See also ==
- Sarnath Jain Tirth
- Parshvanath Jain temple, Varanasi
- Chandra Prabha Wildlife Sanctuary

== Sources ==
- Cunningham, Alexander (1879). Report of a Tour in the Gangetic Provinces from Badaon to Bihar in 1875–76 and 1877–78 (PDF). Archaeological Survey of India Reports. Calcutta: Office of the Superintendent of Government Printing.
- Reddy, Pedarapu Chenna (2022). Nagabharana: Recent Trends in Jainism Studies. Blue Rose Publishers. ISBN 978-93-56114-46-3.
- Singh, Rana P. B. (2009). Banaras: Making of India's Heritage City. Cambridge Scholars Publishing. ISBN 9781443815796.
- Singh, Binay (25 August 2015). "4 Jain Tirthankaras born in Varanasi". The Times of India.
- TNN (9 June 2023). "New ghat to come up at Chandravati, a Jain pilgrimage site". The Times of India.
