= Atishaya Kshetra Lunwa Jain Temple =

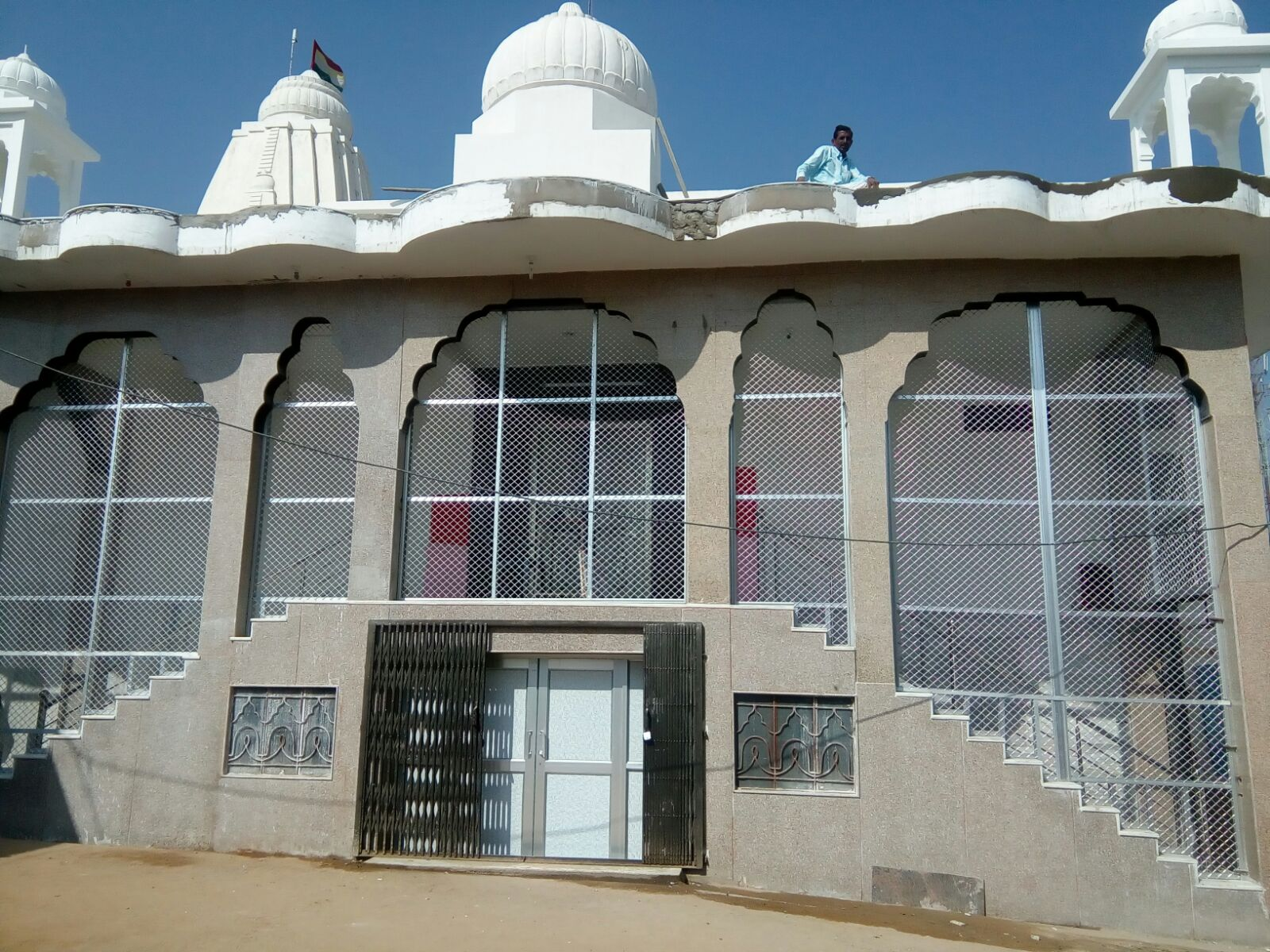
- Khandelwal Jain Mandir, Lunwa

Religion
- Affiliation: Jainism
- Deity: Chandraprabha, Neminatha
- Festival: Mahavir Jayanti

Location
- Location: Lunwa, Nagaur, Rajasthan
- Interactive map of Atishaya Kshetra Lunwa Jain Temple

Architecture
- Established: 1672 AD
- Temple: 2

Atishay Kshetra Lunwa is a famous Jain pilgrimage site situated 70 km from Jaipur in Lunwa, a small village in the Nagaur district of Rajasthan, India. The temple, one of two Jain temples in Lunwa, was established in 1672.

== About ==
Idols buried around Atishay Kshetra are thought to date from the 6th century BC.

== Temples in Lunwa ==
There are two Jain temple in Lunwa; both have historical significance and are famous for the Chamatkar. Devotees make wishes in the temples they believe will be fulfilled.

- Khandelwal Digambar Jain Mandir : This temple has main Idol of Lord Aadinath which is First Tirthankar of Jainism. The temple is more than 400 years old and its history dates back to V.S. 1672. It was then that the Idol of Lord Chandra Prabhu, the eighth Tirthankar of Jainism, was found during construction on the border of Naraina, a Village in Rajasthan. The two polities disputed who should take control of the idol. It was eventually decided that the idol would be put in a cart drawn by a bull and released. The village in which the bull stopped would collectively become its owner. The bull ran almost 45 km before stopping at Adinath Jain Temple Lunwa. Residents of the nearby village of Naraina tracked the cart and handed over the Idol to the Jains of Lunwa to place in the Adinath Jain Temple, which later became Khandelwal Digambar Jain Mandir.
- Digambar Jain Atishaya Kshetra Nasiya Ji: Shri 1008 Neminath Swami Temple, also known as Nasiya Ji, is temple situated near the Lunwa bus stand.This temple is another Chamatkar (miracle) in the Lunwa Village. Around 75 years ago, a farmer was digging a well when he found the idol of Lord Shri Chandra Prabhu and Lord Shri Shantinath. The idol was placed in the Neminath Swami Temple with proper rituals.

== Recent Events ==
The Khandelwal Digambar Jain Temple, Lunwa was under renovation. In April 2016, Panchkalyan Pratishta Mahotsav took place, with Acharya Shri Indranand Ji Maharaj blessing the ceremonies and Mahesh Pandit from Bhopal guiding the rituals.

== Gallery ==
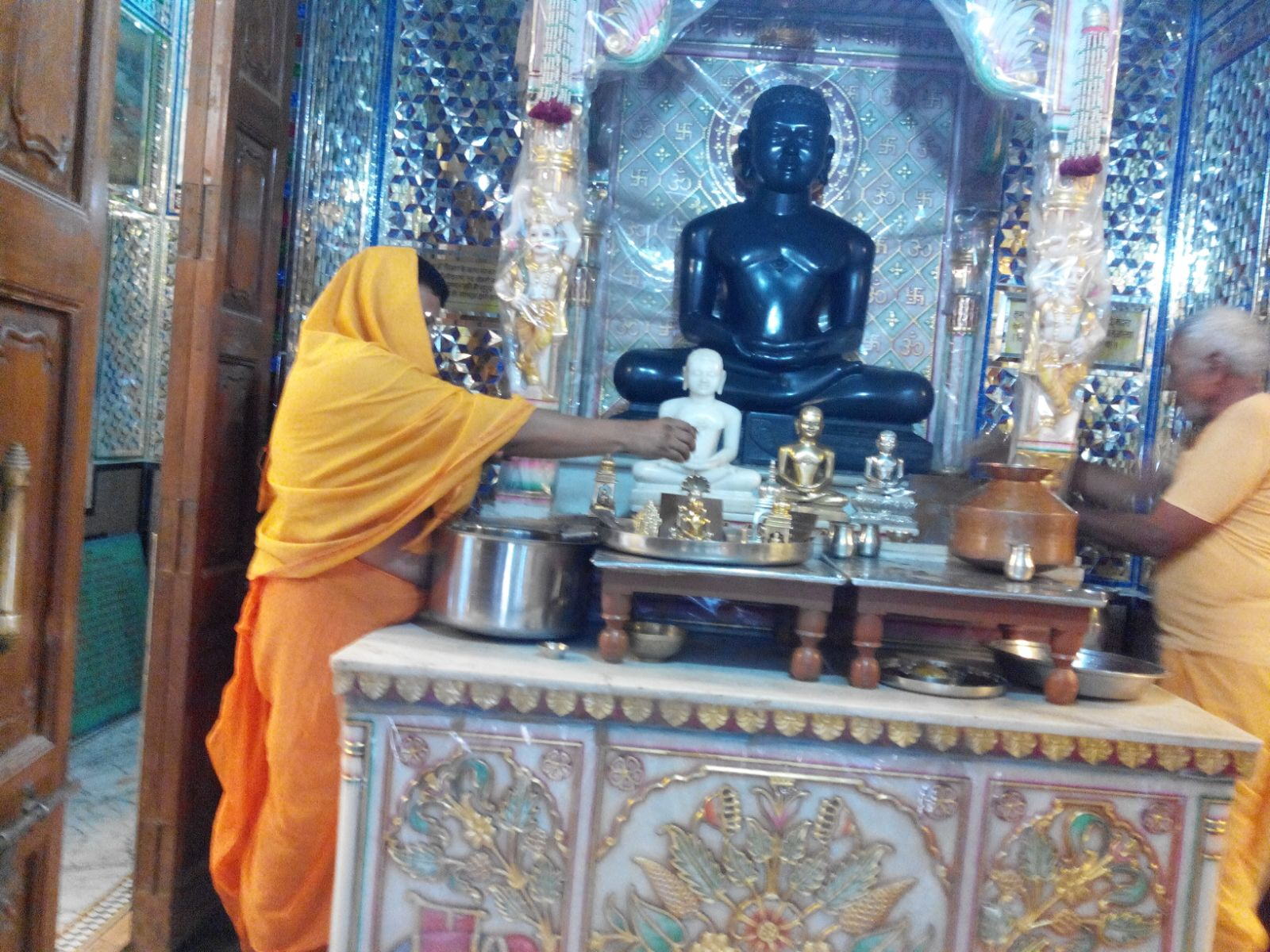
Mulnayak Shri Neminath Bhagwan at Nasiya Ji

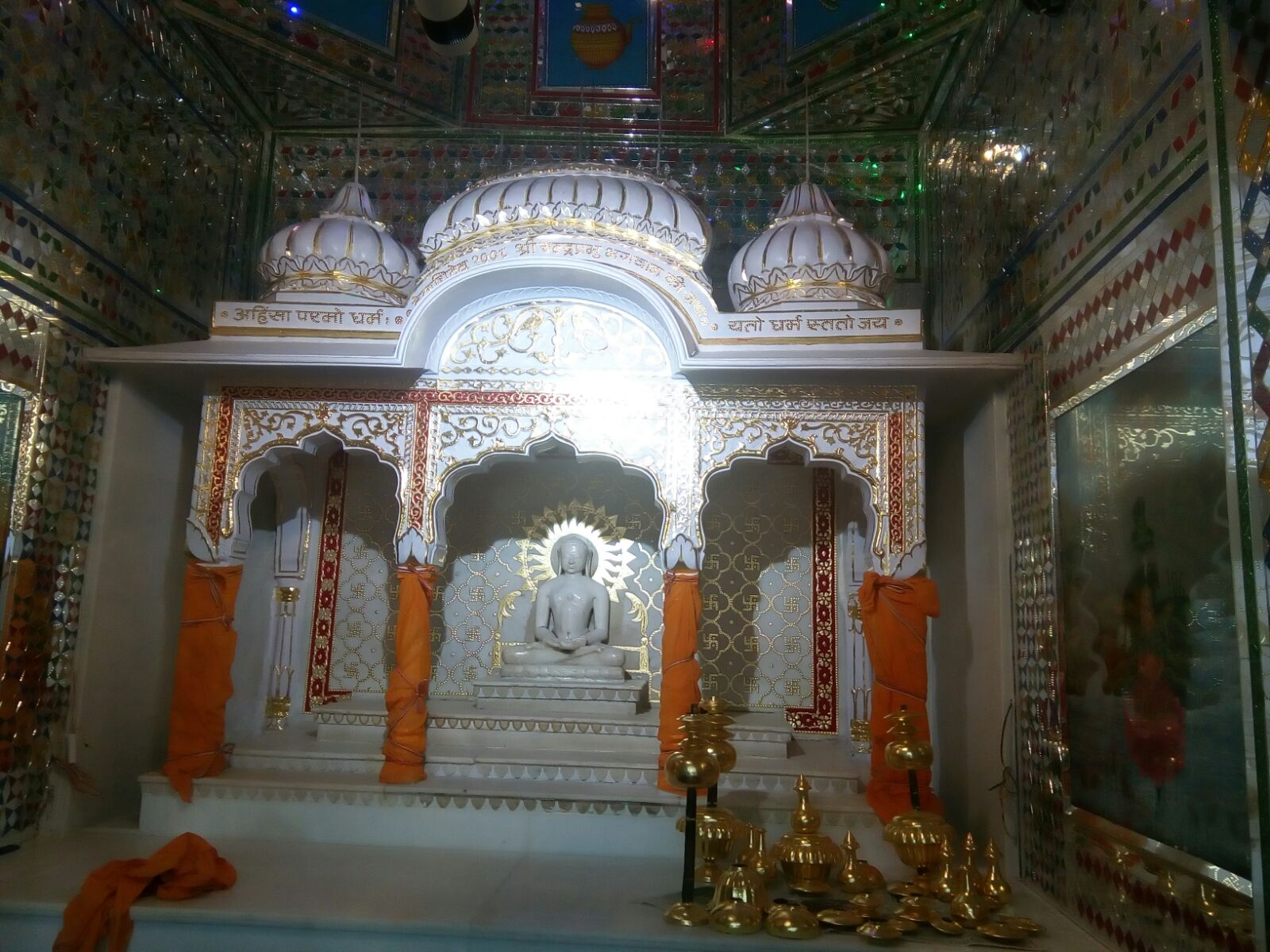
Miracle Idol of Shri Chandra Prabhu Bhagwan, in Khandelwal Jain Temple reached in Bullock Cart.

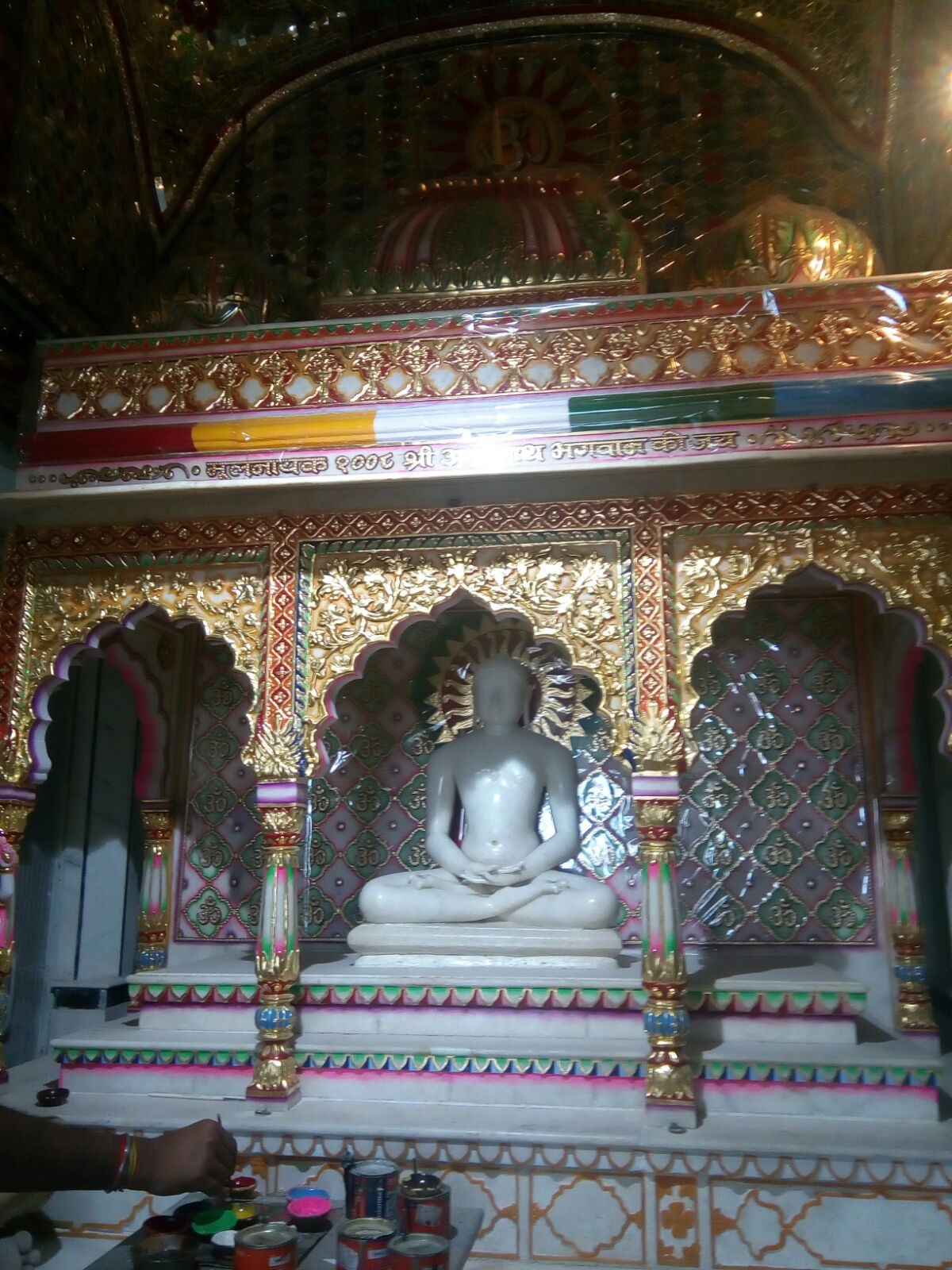
Shri Adinath Bhagwan in Khandelwal Jain Temple, Lunwa

== How to Reach ==
Lunwa is a village in the Nagour district.

- By Road : Lunwa is 70 km away from Jaipur and is 4 km inside Nawa-Sambhar Highway from village Lohrana. Also it can be reached via Jobner -Bheslana-Bhadwa.Road are excellent and it take one hour to reach there from Jaipur..Rajasthan.
- By Train : Nearest Railway Station to Lunwa is Phulera 24 km away from Lunwa and Taxi and local conveyance is easily available.
- By Air : Nearest Domestic and International Airport to Lunwa is Jaipur, situated 70 km away.

Nearby Place : Jaipur: 70 km, Nawa: 21 km, Sambhar: 22 km, Renwal: 34 km

== See also ==
- Jainism in Rajasthan
