= Mandaragiri =

Jain temple in the state of Karnataka

- ಮಂದಾರಗಿರಿ
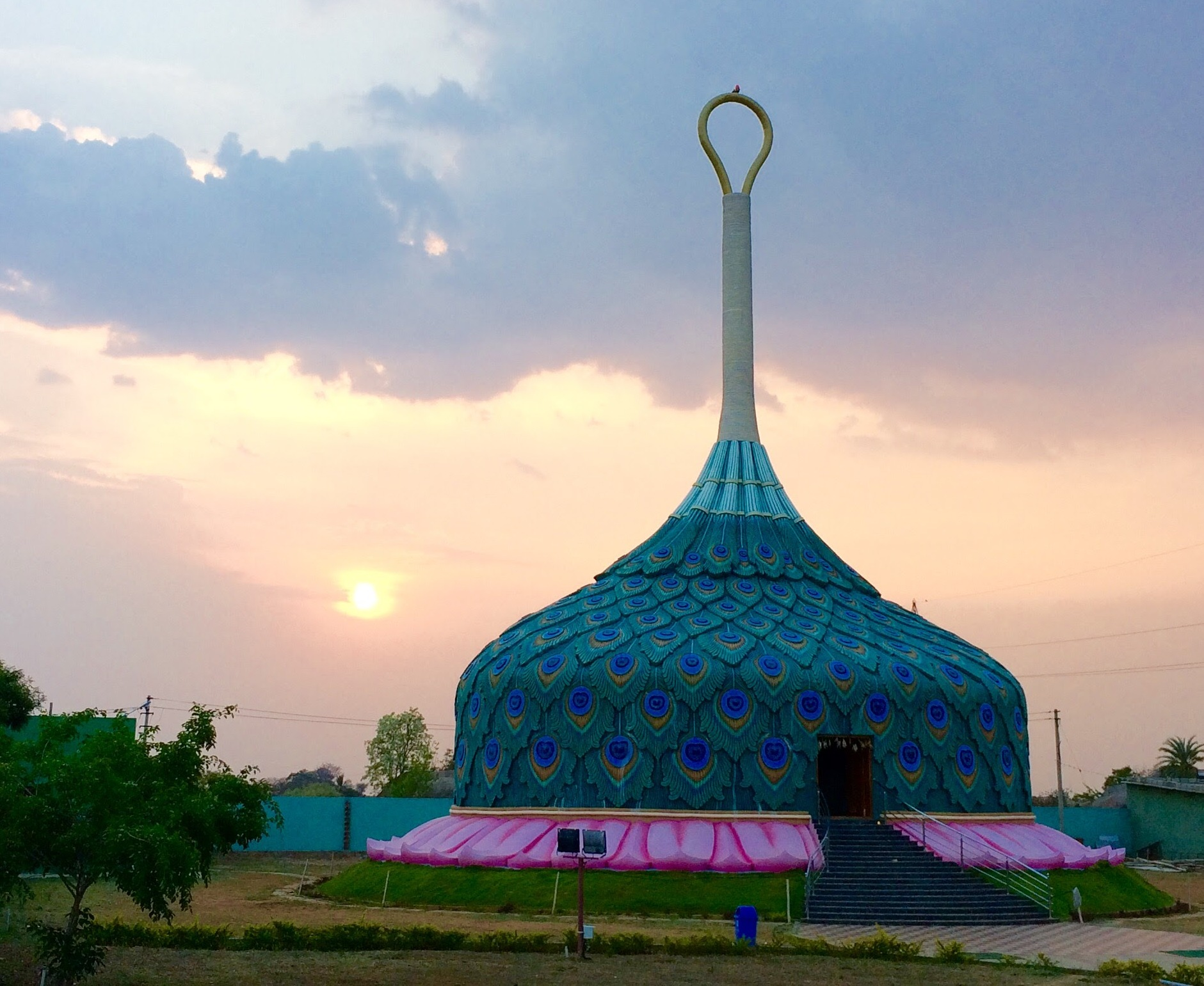
- Guru mandir

- Location within Karnataka

Religion
- Affiliation: Jainism
- Sect: Digambara
- Deity: Chandraprabha, Parshvanatha and Suparshvanatha
- Festival: Mahavir Jayanti

Location
- Location: Madhugiri, Karnataka
- Coordinates: 13°18′11″N 77°11′9.5″E

Architecture
- Established: 12th century
- Temple: 7

Mandaragiri or Basadi-betta is a Jain pilgrimage located on Mandaragiri Hill in Tumkur district in the Indian state of Karnataka.

== History ==
The Mandaragiri temple complex is an important Jain pilgrimage centre named after Mallinatha. The historic religious centre developed on the summit of Mandaragiri, where four Jain temples dating to the 12th century survive within a walled enclosure. The modern development of the pilgrimage site expanded beyond the historic hilltop enclosure to the foot of the hill, where the Guru Mandir and a monumental image of Chandraprabha were subsequently constructed.

== Hilltop temple complex ==
The hilltop complex contains four 12th-century Jain temples and a stupa enclosed by a massive stone wall decorated with paintings of the Tirthankaras. The four temples form a compact group within the enclosure. Of these, one does not presently enshrine an image, while the remaining three are dedicated respectively to Chandraprabha, the eighth Tirthankara; Parshvanatha, the twenty-third Tirthankara; and Suparshvanatha, the seventh Tirthankara. The back wall of the enclosure incorporates what was originally the entrance to the temple complex. The gateway is flanked by two pillars bearing carvings of elephants and an image of a Tirthankara seated on a lotus pedestal. The hilltop has four twelfth-century temples and one stupa enclosed in a massive stone wall with paintings of Tirthankaras. The first temple doesn't enshrine any idols and the remaining three temples are dedicated to Chandraprabha, Parshvanatha and Suparshvanatha. The stupa houses one stone slab with a carving of a footprint. The enclosure also contains a large manastambha, a monumental pillar characteristic of Jain temple complexes.

Maidala Kere and Padmavati Kere are the two lakes located near the temple complex on the hilltop. There is a ruined temple housing a large stone-carved image of a Tirthankara near Maidala lake. There are eight idols of goddesses scattered near the Padmavati Kere.

== Other temple ==
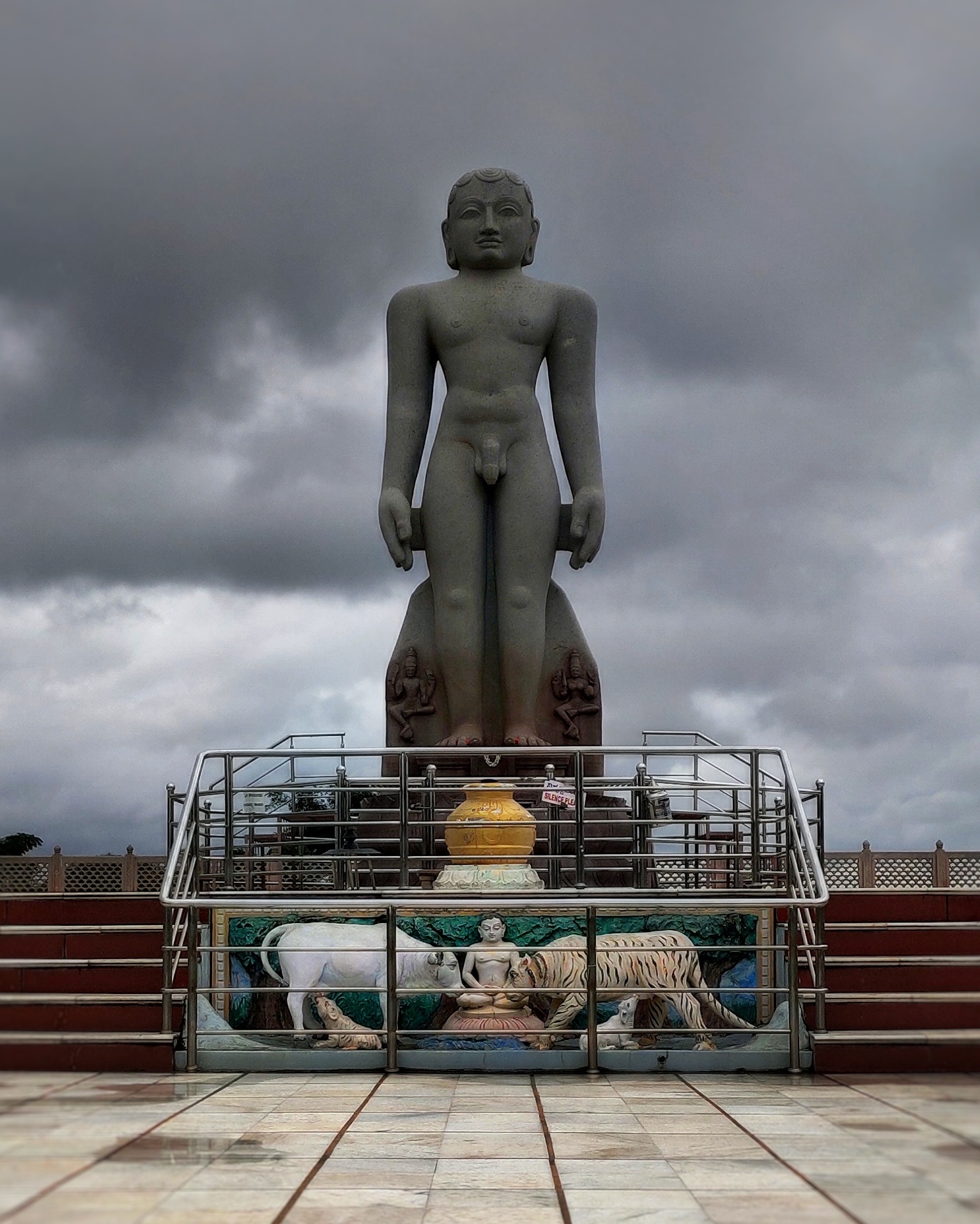
21 feet (6.4 m) Chandraprabha statue

=== Stupa ===
In addition to the four temples, the hilltop enclosure contains a Jain stupa. A stone slab bearing a representation of footprints is enshrined within it. The footprint representation provides an aniconic element within a complex otherwise principally characterised by images of the Tirthankaras.

=== Guru Mandir ===
On the foot of the hill, an 81 feet (25 m) temple called Guru mandir dedicated to Jain Acharya Shantisagar is located. This temple is popularly known as pinchi temple and peacock temple due to the temple structure resembling a pinchi, peacock feather fan, used by Digambara monks. A 21 feet (6.4 m) monolithic statue of Chandraprabha is located near Guru mandir.

== See also ==
- Shravanabelagola
- Aagam Mandir, Tumkur
