= Chandraprabha =

8th Jain Tirthankara

- 8th Jain Tirthankara
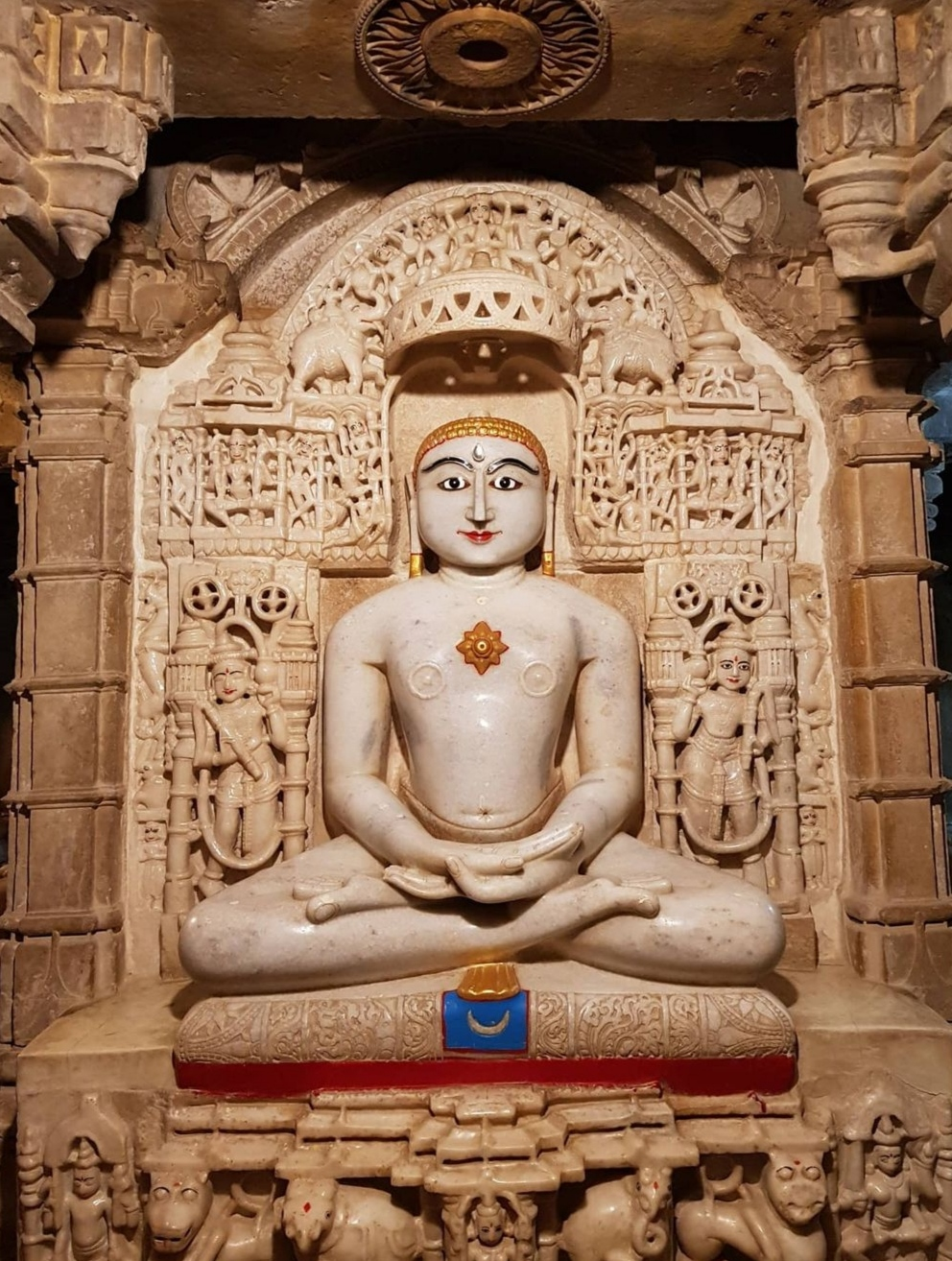
- Idol of Chandraprabha Bhagwan at a Jain Temple in Jaisalmer Fort, Rajasthan, India
- Other names: Chanda Prabhu
- Venerated in: Jainism
- Predecessor: Suparshvanatha
- Successor: Pushpadanta
- Symbol: Crescent Moon
- Height: 150 bows (450 meters)
- Age: 1,000,000 purva (70.56 Quintillion years)
- Color: White

Genealogy
- Born: Chandrapuri
- Died: Sammed Shikhar
- Parents: Mahāsena (father); Lakṣmaṇā (mother)
- Dynasty: Ikṣvākuvaṁśa

Chandraprabha (English: Lord of Moon) or Chandranatha is the eighth Tīrthaṅkara of Jainism in the present age (Avasarpini). According to traditional accounts, he was born to King Mahasena and Queen Lakshmana Devi at Chandrapuri to the Ikshvaku dynasty. According to Jain texts, his birth-date was the twelfth day of the Posh Krishna month of the Indian calendar. He is said to have become a siddha, a liberated soul which has destroyed all of its karma.

== Jain biography ==
Chandraprabha was the eighth Jain Tīrthankara of the present age (avasarpini). He was born to King Mahasena and Queen Lakshmana Devi at Chandrapuri, Varanasi on 12th day month Pausa in the Ikshvaku clan. Nine months before the birth of Chandraprabha, Queen Lakshmana Devi dreamt the sixteen most auspicious dreams. Mahasena named Tirthankar Chandraprabha because of his complexion was white as moon. According to Uttarapurana, Indra named him Chandraprabha because at his birth the earth and night-lotus were blossomed.

Chandraprabha's height is mentioned as 150 dhanusha. He is said to have lived for 1,000,000 purva. He spent 2$\tfrac{1}{2}$ lakh pūrva as youth (kumāra kāla) and ruled His kingdom for 6$\tfrac{1}{2}$ lakh pūrva and 24 pūrvāṇga (rājya kāla). During his rule, Chandraprabhu was apathetic towards the ordinary delights and princely grandeur. He decided to renounced his worldly life, soon after his ascension to throne and after 3 months he obtained Kevala Jnana (omniscience) while mediating under Naga tree.

After a many years of spreading his knowledge, he is said to have attained nirvana at Sammed Shikharji on the seventh day of the bright half of the month of faalgun. (Note: Some texts refer to the place as Mount Sammeta. This place is revered in Jainism because 20 out of 24 Jinas died here.)

Chandraprabha is said to have been born 900 crore sagara after his predecessor, Suparsvanatha. His successor, Pushpadanta, is said to have been born 90 crore sagara after him.

The yaksha and yakshi of Shantinatha are Śyāma and Jvālāmālinī according to Digambara tradition and Vijaya and Bhṛkuṭi according to Śvētāmbara tradition.

According to Digambara Vaidarbha Svami and Varuṉā were the chief Ganadhara and Aryika of the Chandraprabha disciples and Dinna and Vāruṇī according to Śvētāmbara.

== Legacy ==
=== Worship ===
Jinastotrāņi is a collection of hymn dedicated to Chandraprabha along with Munisuvrata, Neminatha, Shantinatha, Mahavira, Parshvanatha and Rishabhanatha.

Svayambhūstotra by Acharya Samantabhadra is the adoration of twenty-four Tīrthankaras. Its five slokas (aphorisms) are dedicated to Tīrthankara Chandraprabha.

With complexation bright as the rays of the moon you had the radiated knowledge like another moon. You are worshiped by eminent beings; you are the Lord of learned ascetic; and had conquered all your karmas and internal passion. I bow to you, O Lord Chandraprabha, the processor of moonlike splendour.

— Svayambhūstotra (8-1-36)

Chandraprabha is associated with crescent moon emblem, Naga tree, Vijya or Śyāma (Dig.) & Vijya (Svet.) Yaksha and Jwalamalini (Dig.) & Bhṛkuṭi (Svet.) Yakshi.

=== In literature ===
Chandraprabha-charitra composed by Haribhadra is an adoration to Chandraprabha. Chandraprabha is mentioned in the Buddhist scriptures.

=== Iconography ===
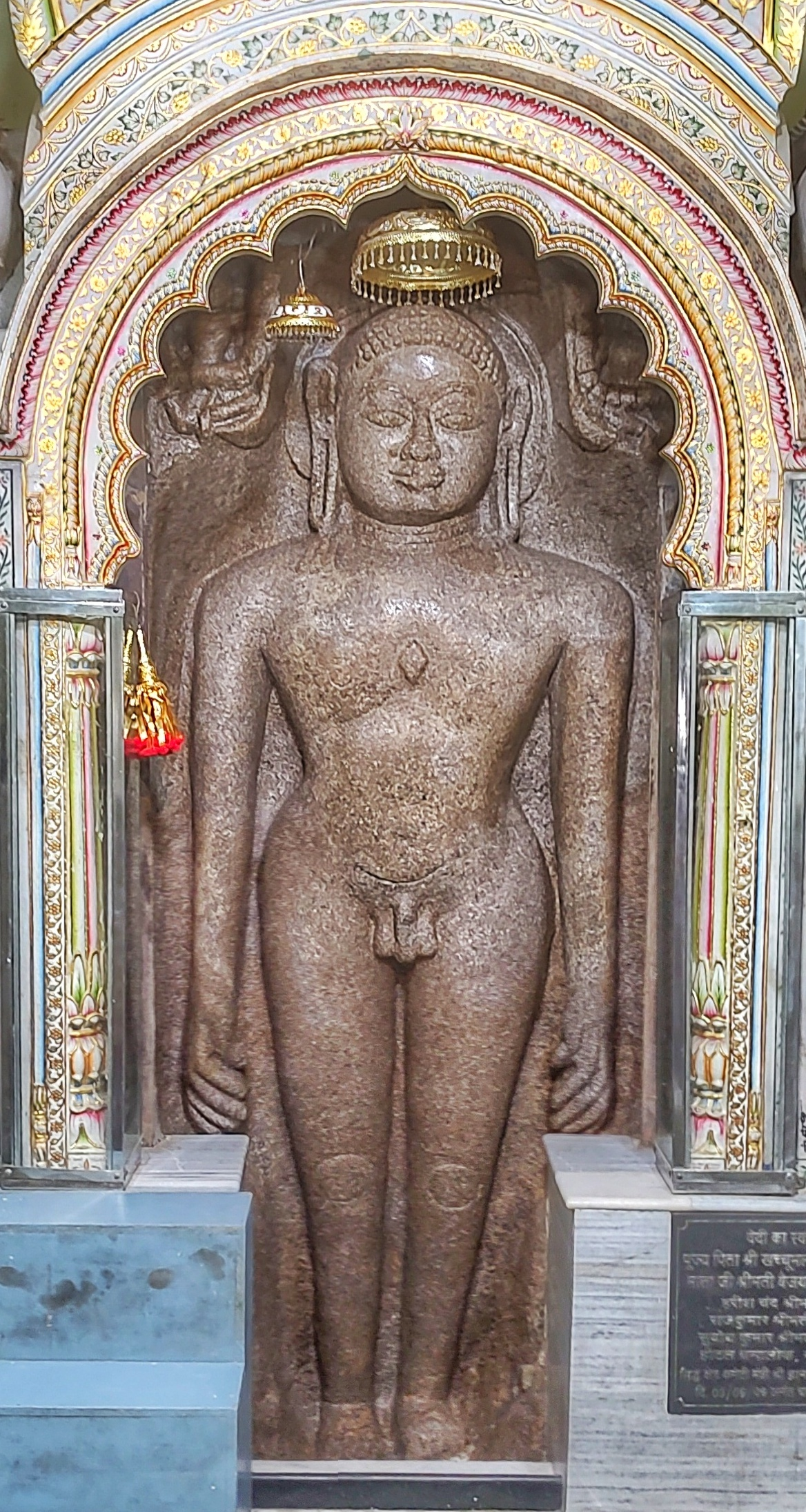
5th or 6th-century idol at Sonagiri, Madhya Pradesh

Chandraprabha is usually depicted in a lotus or kayotsarga posture, with a crescent moon symbol beneath him; each tīrthankara has a distinct emblem, which allows worshippers to distinguish similar idols. Like all tirthankaras, he is depicted with a Shrivatsa (Note: A special symbol that marks the chest of a Tirthankara. The yoga pose is very common in Buddhism, Hinduism, and Jainism. Each tradition has had a distinctive auspicious chest mark that allows devotees to identify a meditating statue to symbolic icon for their theology. There are several srivasta found in ancient and medieval Jain art works, and these are not found on Buddhist or Hindu art works.) and downcast eyes.

The earliest known sculpture of Chandraprabha was installed by Maharajadhiraja Ramagupta of Gupta dynasty in 4th century CE. Chandraprabha has been popular amongst Jain everywhere in India. The iconography of Chandraprabha is particularly popular in Eastern India in Bihar, Bengal and Orissa. Sculptures of Chandraprabha were also popular in Jain temples, Deogarh, Khajuraho Jain temples and Sonagiri.

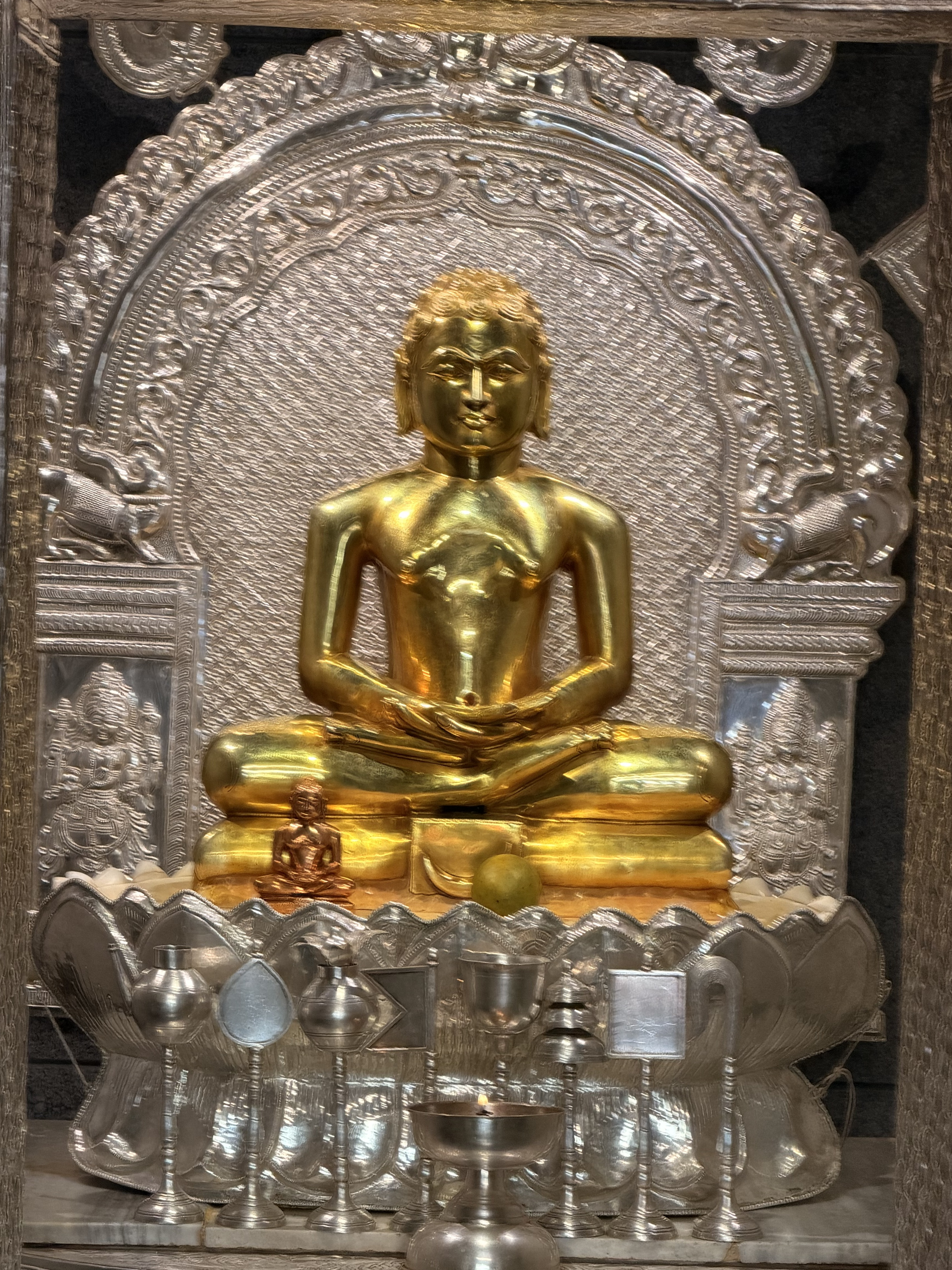
Jain Matha, Shravanabelgola

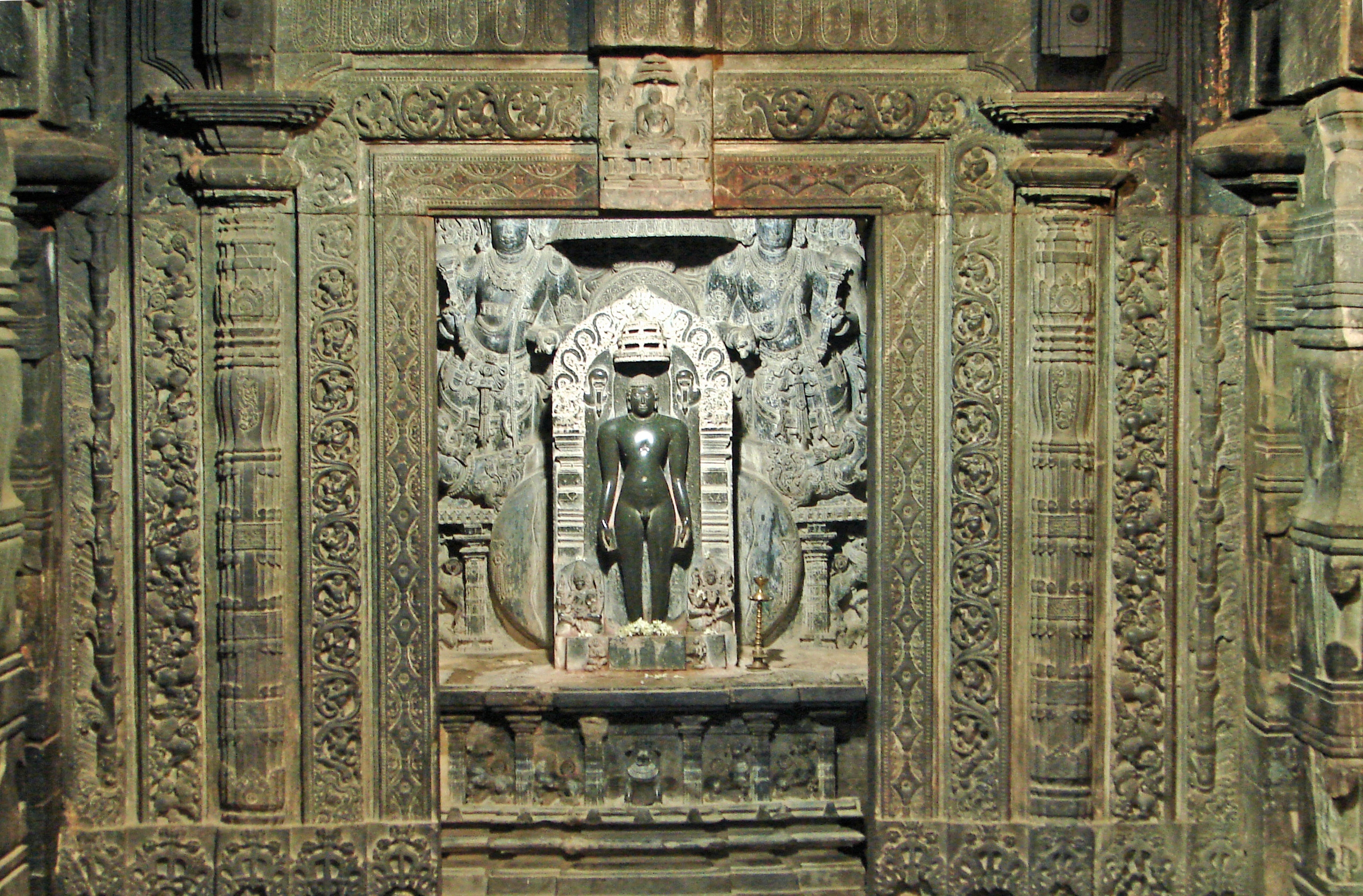
Idol at Jain temple, Lakkundi

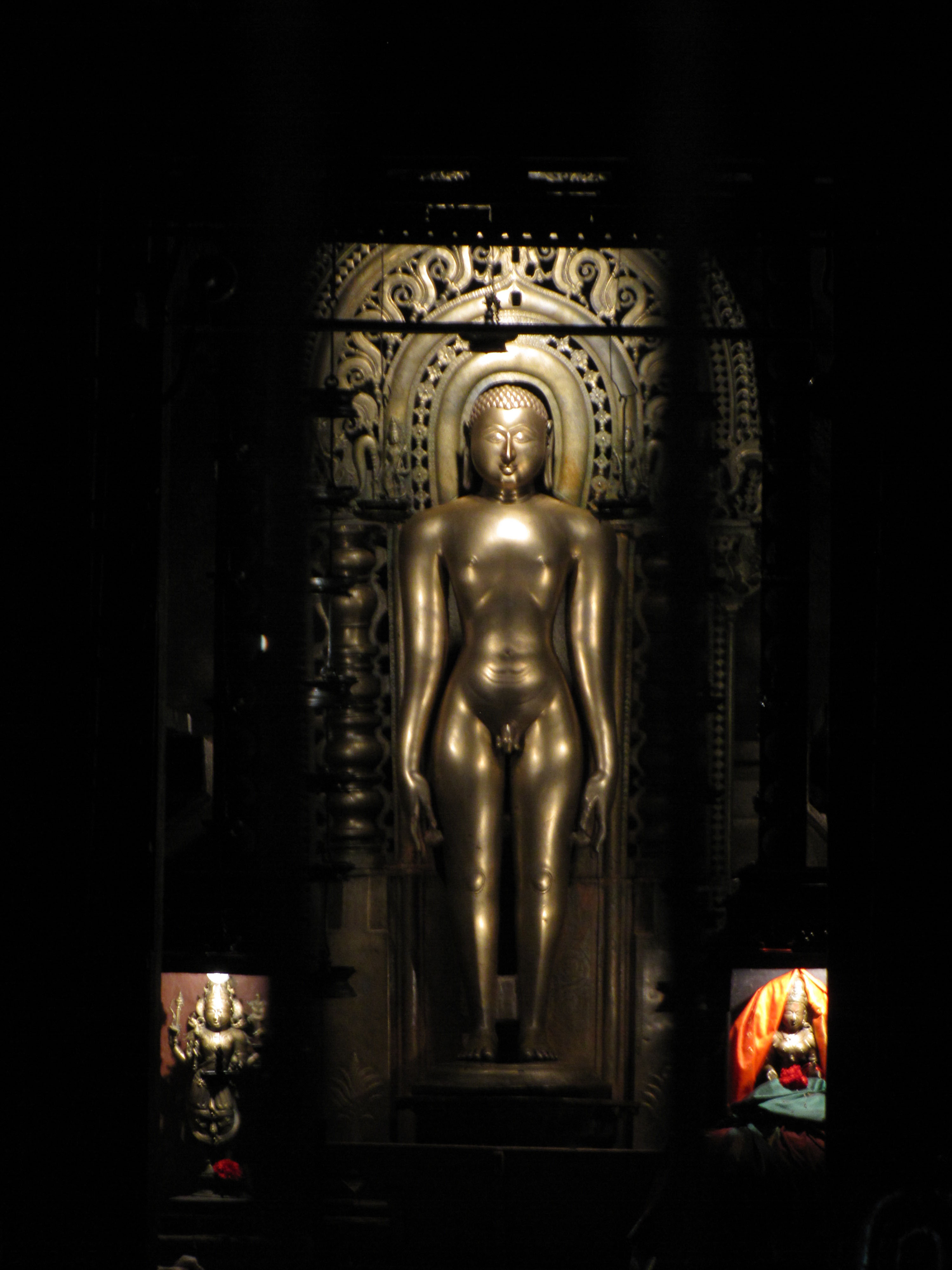
Idol at Saavira Kambada Basadi

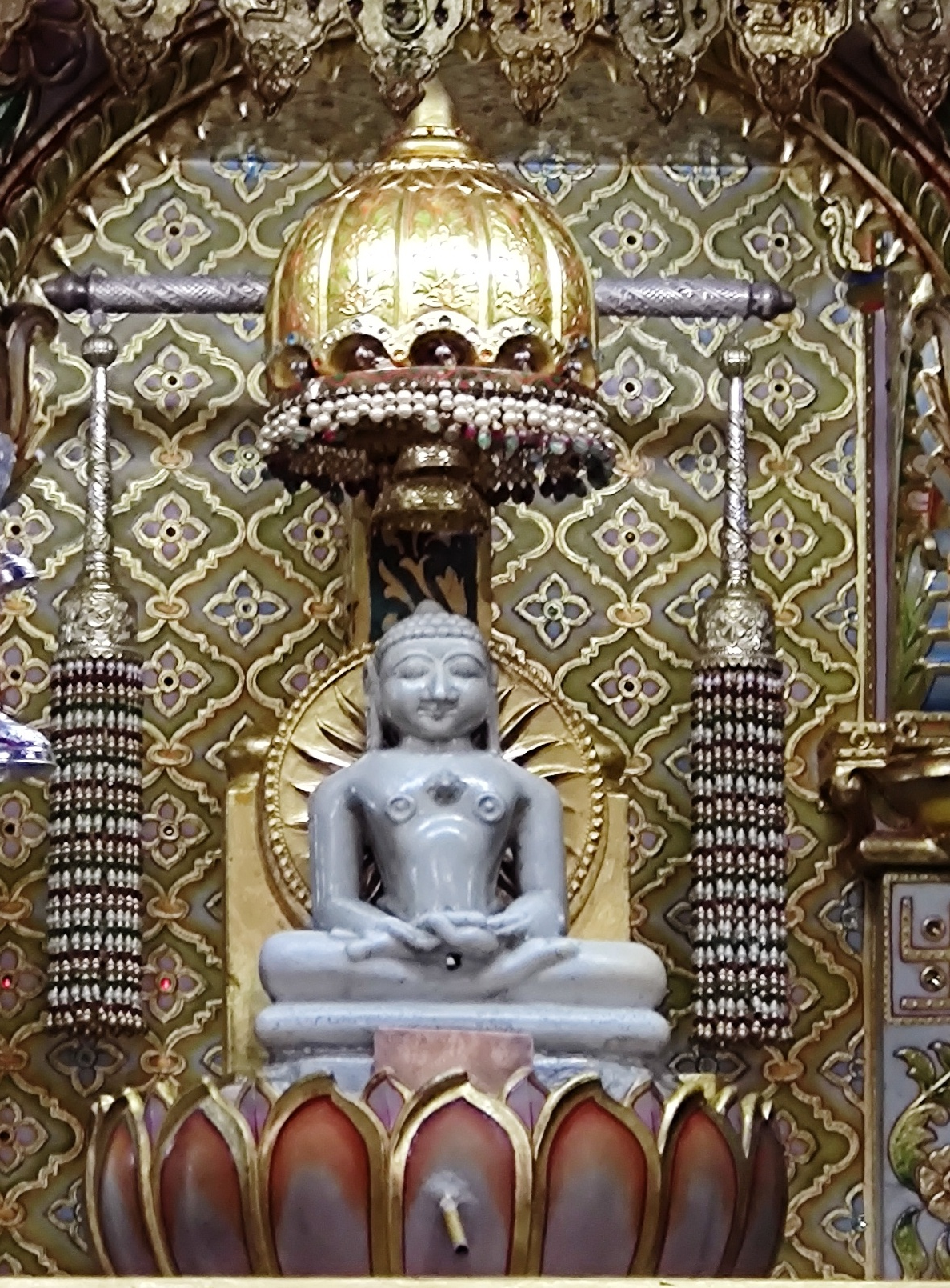
The famous idol of Chandraprabhu at Tijara

=== Ancient artifacts and idols ===
Archaeological excavations of the Hansi hoard from the Asigarh Fort in Haryana yielded 58 bronze idols, prominently featuring depictions of Chandraprabha. Dating to the 8th and 9th centuries CE, these specific artifacts demonstrate the active veneration of these tirthankaras before the collection was hastily buried to protect it from Ghaznavid invasions. The inclusion of these bronzes within the hoard provides critical evidence of their localized worship in early medieval northern India.

=== Colossal statue ===
Guru mandir in Mandaragiri houses a 21 feet (6.4 m) monolithic statue of Chandraprabha.

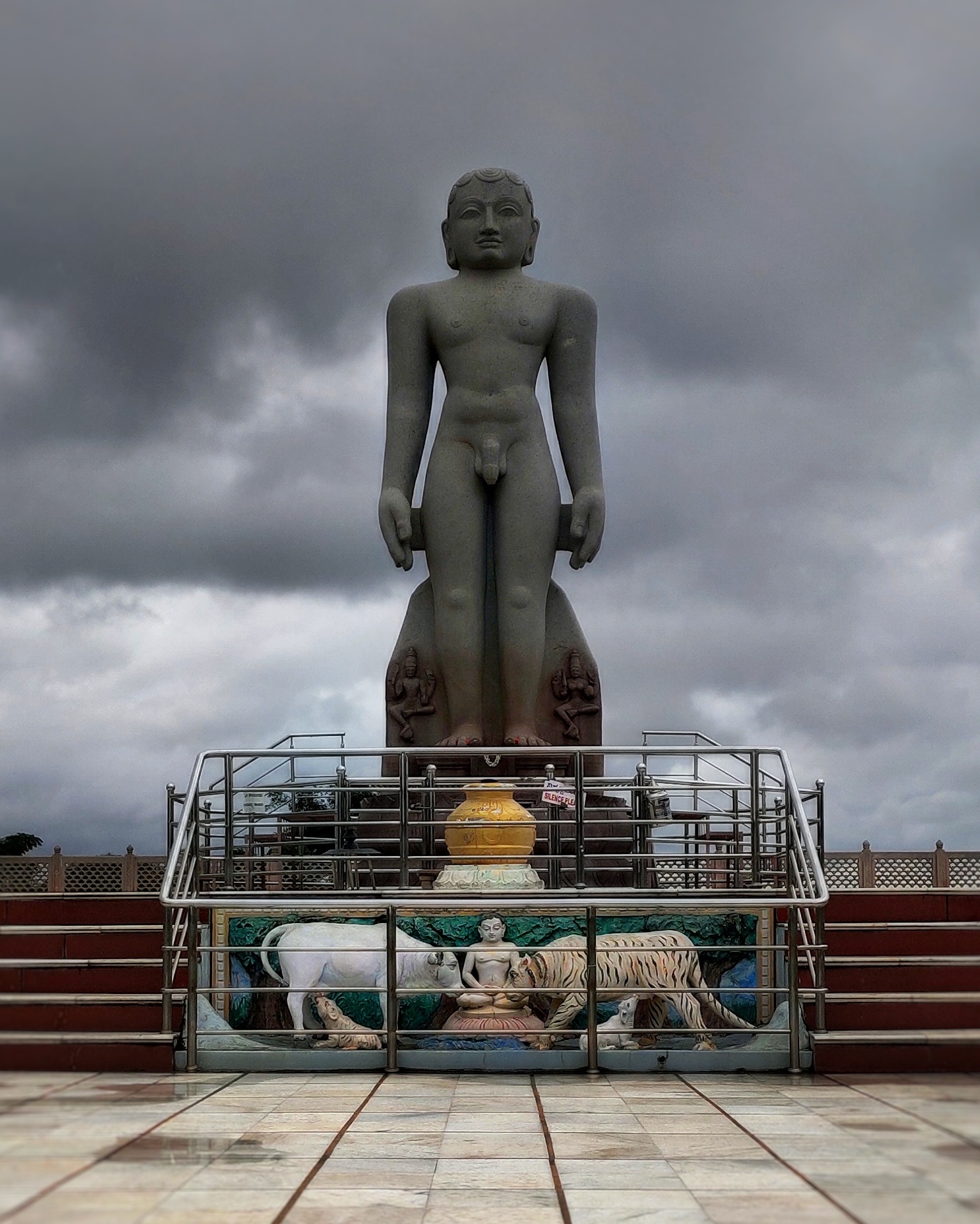
21 feet (6.4 m) statue at Mandaragiri Hill, Tumkur, Karnataka

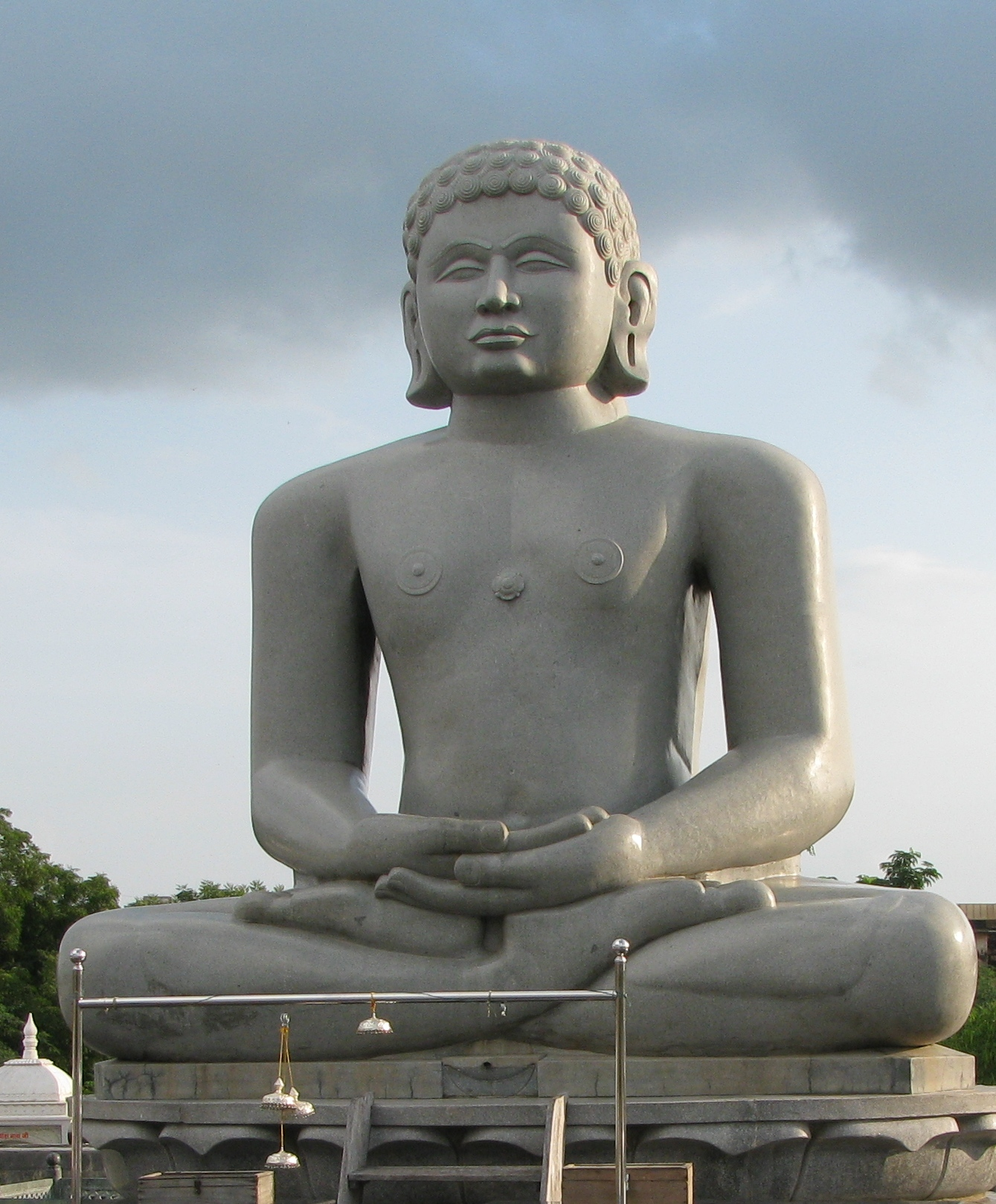
15.25 feet (4.65 m) statue at Chandragiri Vatika, Tijara

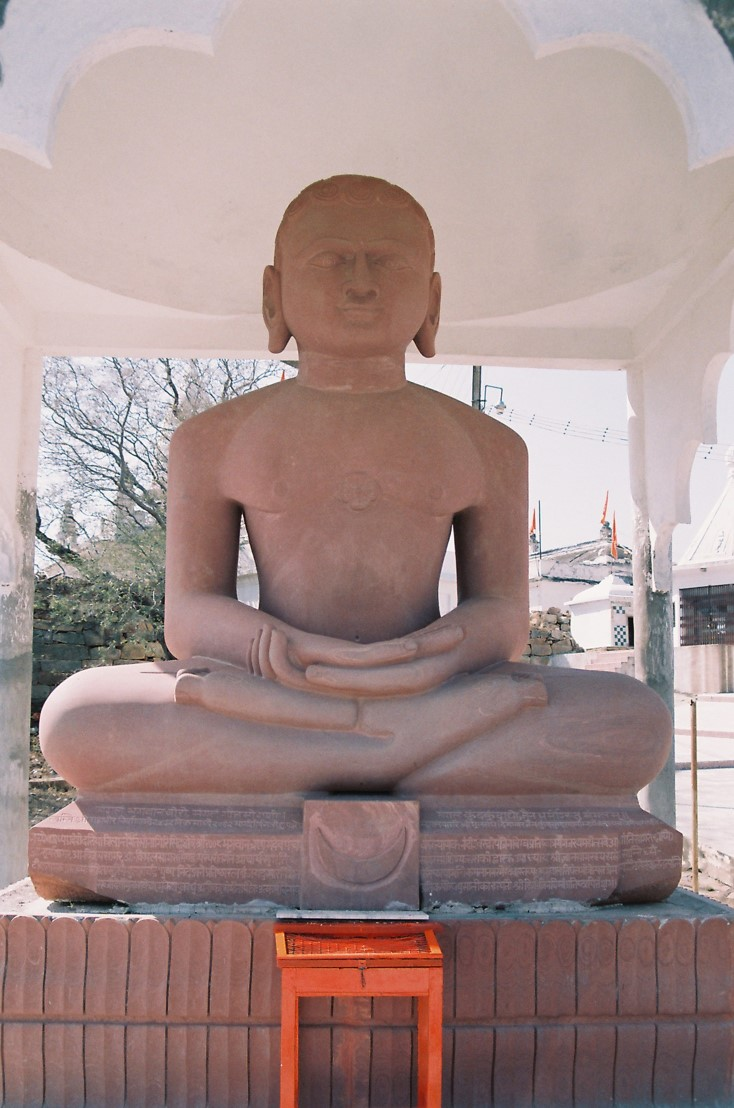
15 feet (4.6 m) statue at Sonagiri

== Main temples ==
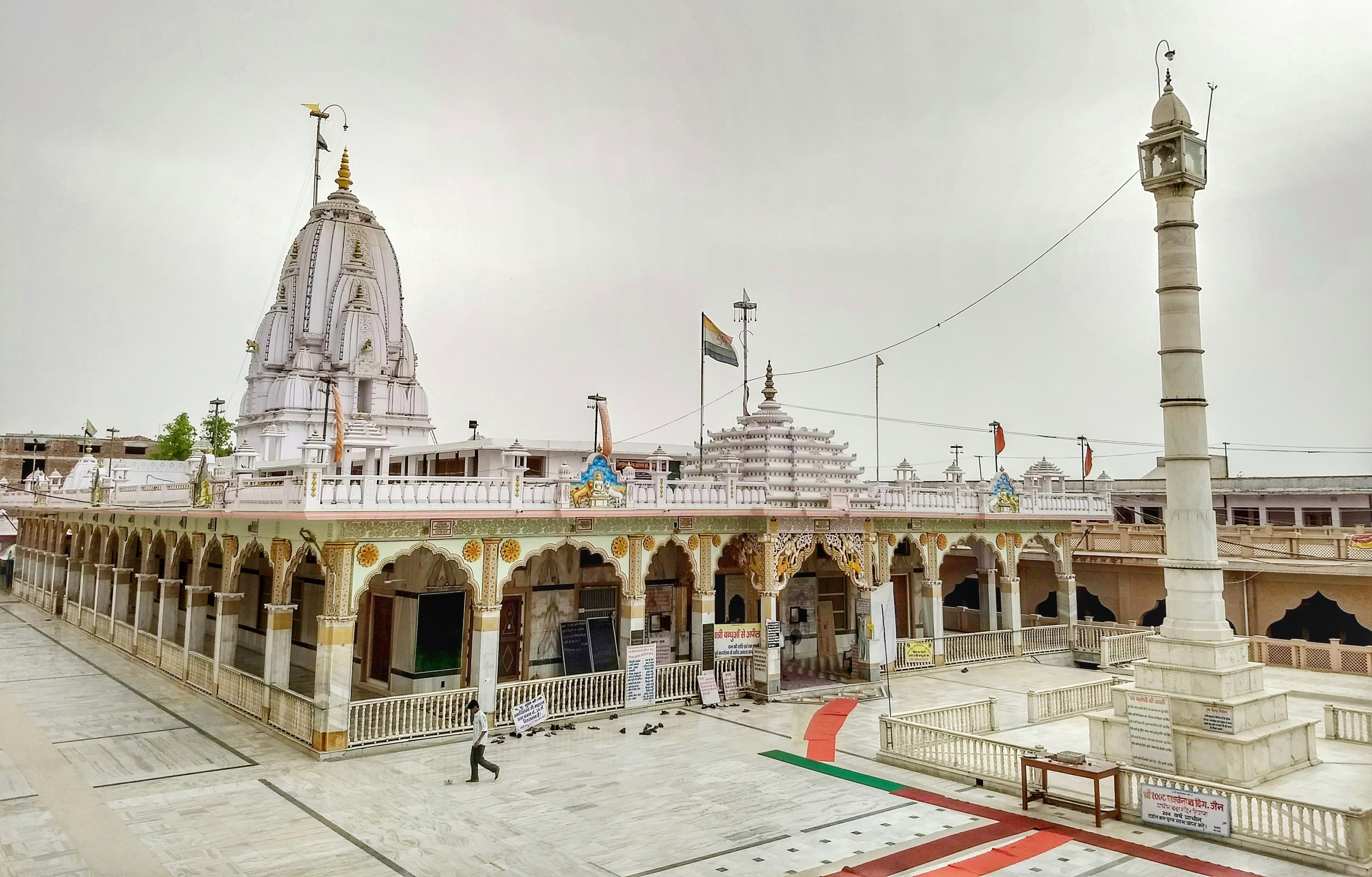
Tijara Jain temple in Rajasthan

Numerous Jain temple complexes across India are dedicated to Chandraprabha.

=== Places of birth and liberation ===
According to Jain tradition, Chandraprabha was born in Chandrapuri (located near Varanasi in Uttar Pradesh), making the city a traditional geographic center for his veneration.

In Jainism, Sammed Shikharji (located on Parasnath Hill in Jharkhand) serves as the geographical location where 20 of the 24 tirthankaras attained liberation. According to Jain texts, Chandraprabha attained ultimate spiritual liberation at this site alongside 1,000 other ascetic monks. The specific hilltop shrine (tonk) dedicated to his liberation is known as Prabhu Koot. Instead of a traditional idol, this tonk enshrines his footprints (charan), which are actively worshipped by pilgrims from both the Digambara and Śvētāmbara sects.

=== Other temples ===
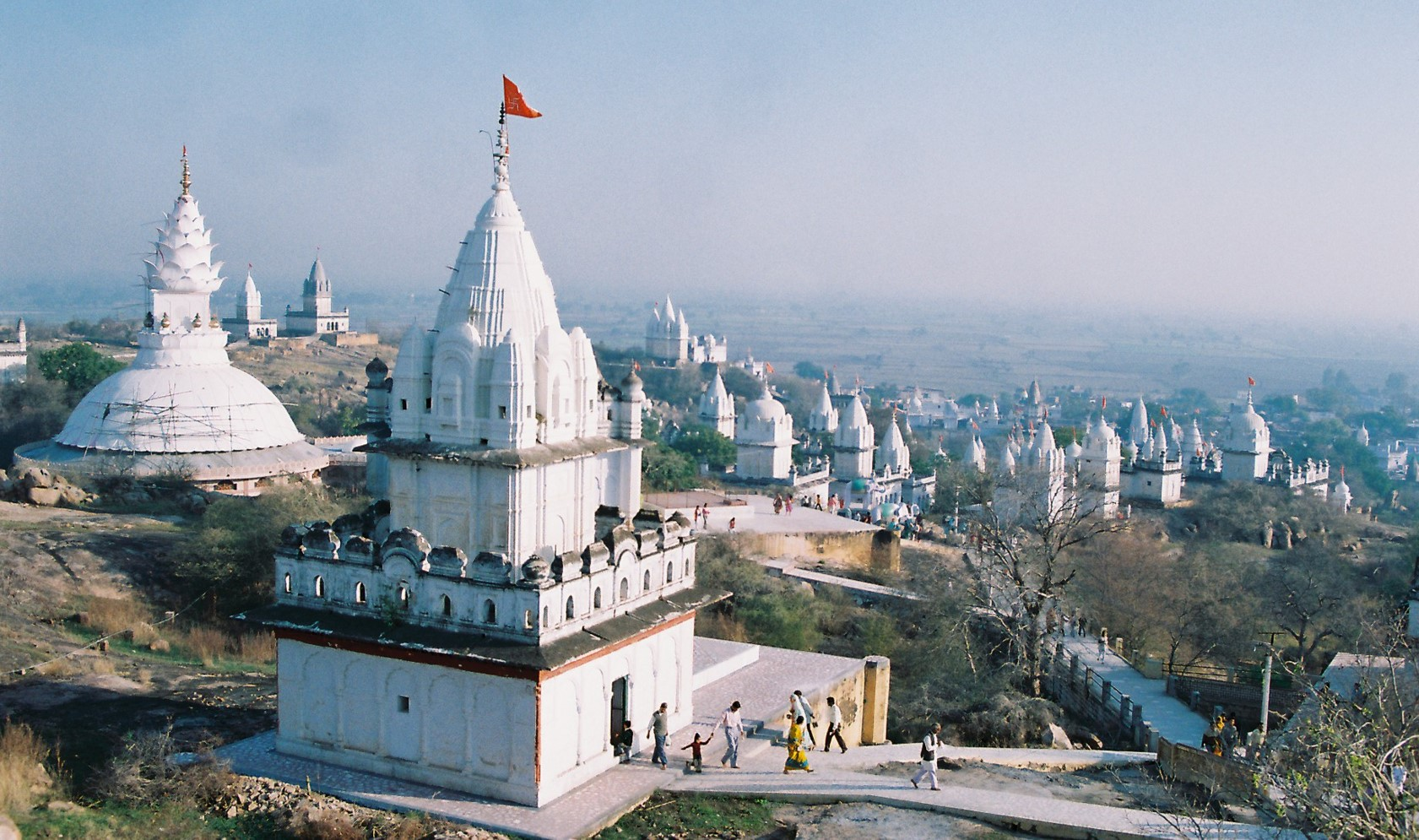
Sonagiri Jain Tirth in Madhya Pradesh

In central India, Sonagiri in Madhya Pradesh serves as a major Siddha-Kshetra (place of salvation) for Digambara Jains, who also refer to it as Laghu Sammed Shikhar. The site comprises 103 temples, with 77 located on the hill and 26 in the village below. Its principal deity (moolnayak) is a 3 metres (9.8 ft) rock-cut image of Chandraprabha dating to the 5th or 6th century.

In northern and western India, the Tijara Jain temple in Rajasthan is a prominent Digambara shrine dedicated to him, while the historic Jaisalmer Fort houses a dedicated Chandraprabhu temple within its complex. Other temples in western India include shrines at the Pavagadh hill complex, the Lunwa Jain temple, and sites in Chandravati and Veraval in Gujarat.

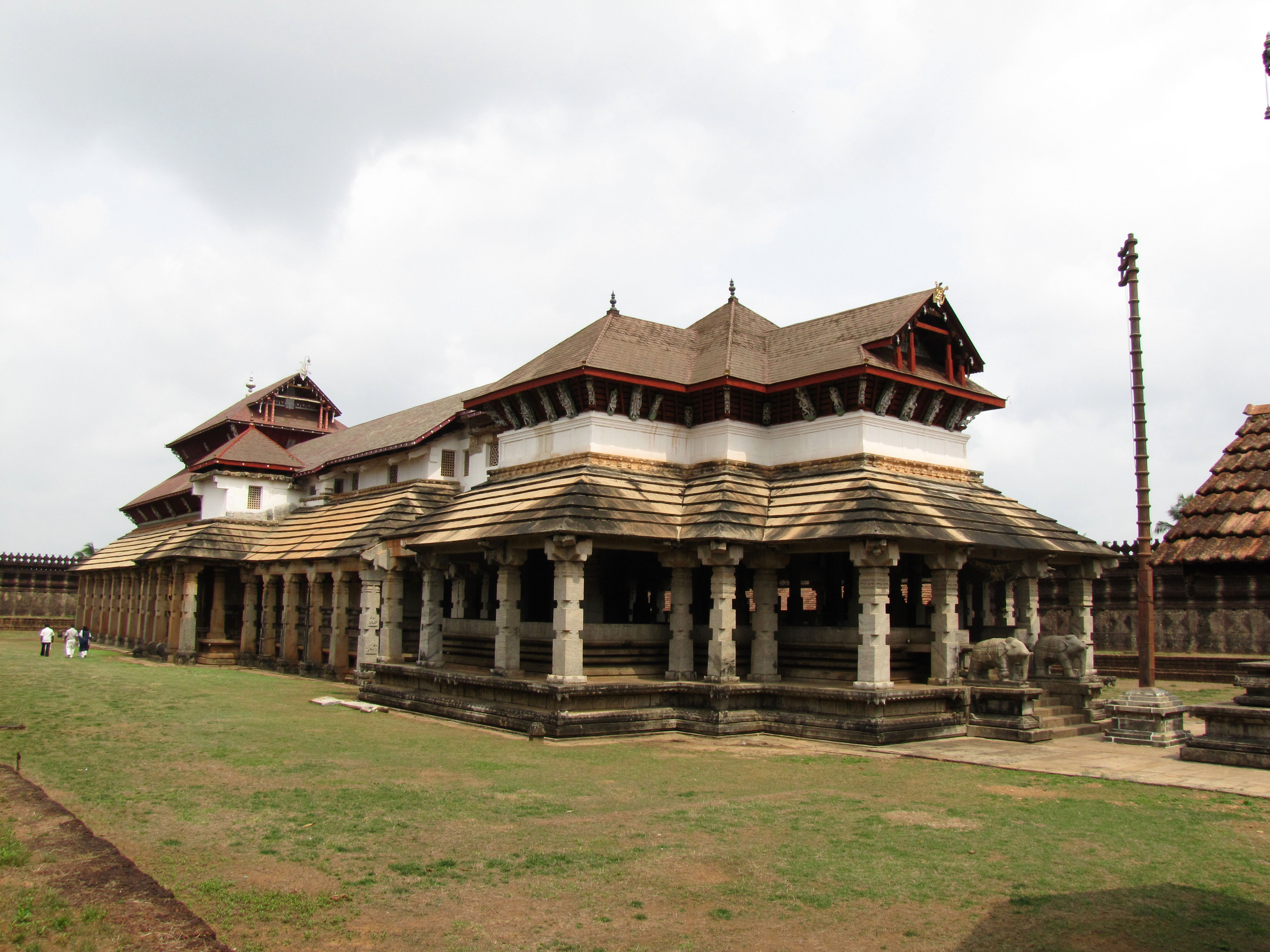
Saavira Kambada Basadi also known as "The 1000 Pillars Temple"

In southern India, the Saavira Kambada Basadi (Thousand Pillared Temple) in Moodabidri, Karnataka, was constructed in 1430 CE and remains a significant architectural and religious center and is also known as Jain Kashi. Other notable shrines in Karnataka include the Dharmasthala Temple and the site at Mandaragiri. In Tamil Nadu, the Vijayamangalam Jain temple was constructed around 678 CE during the reign of King Konguvelir of the Velir dynasty. Additional southern complexes include the Kumbakonam Jain Temple in Tamil Nadu and the Jainimedu Jain temple in Palakkad, Kerala.

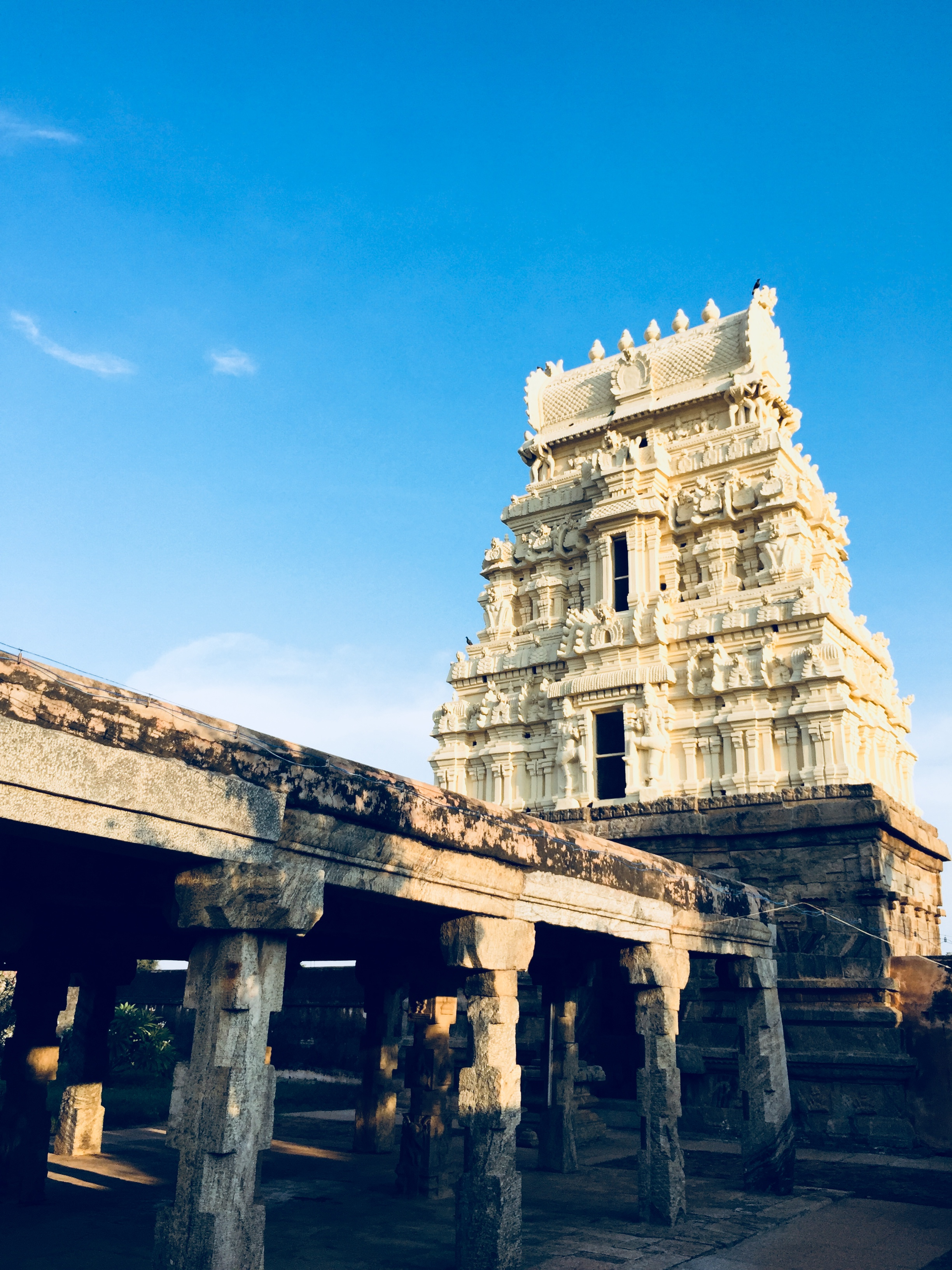
Vijayamangalam Jain temple built in 678 C.E.

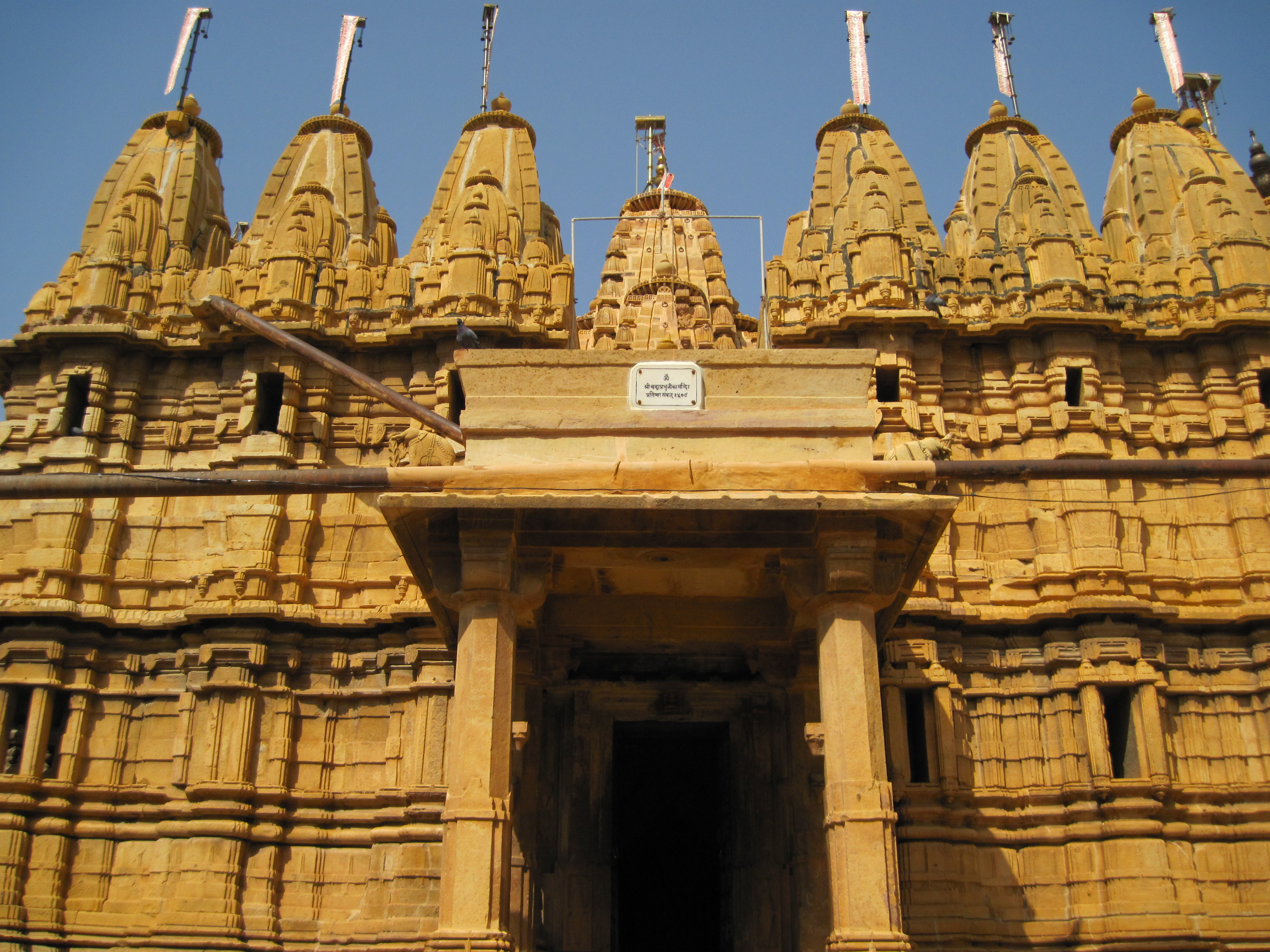
Chandraprabhu temple, Jaisalmer Fort

== See also ==
- Arihant (Jainism)
- God in Jainism
- Jainism and non-creationism
