= Tijara Jain temple =

Indian Jain Temple

- श्री 1008 चंद्रप्रभु दिगंबर जैन अतिशय क्षेत्र
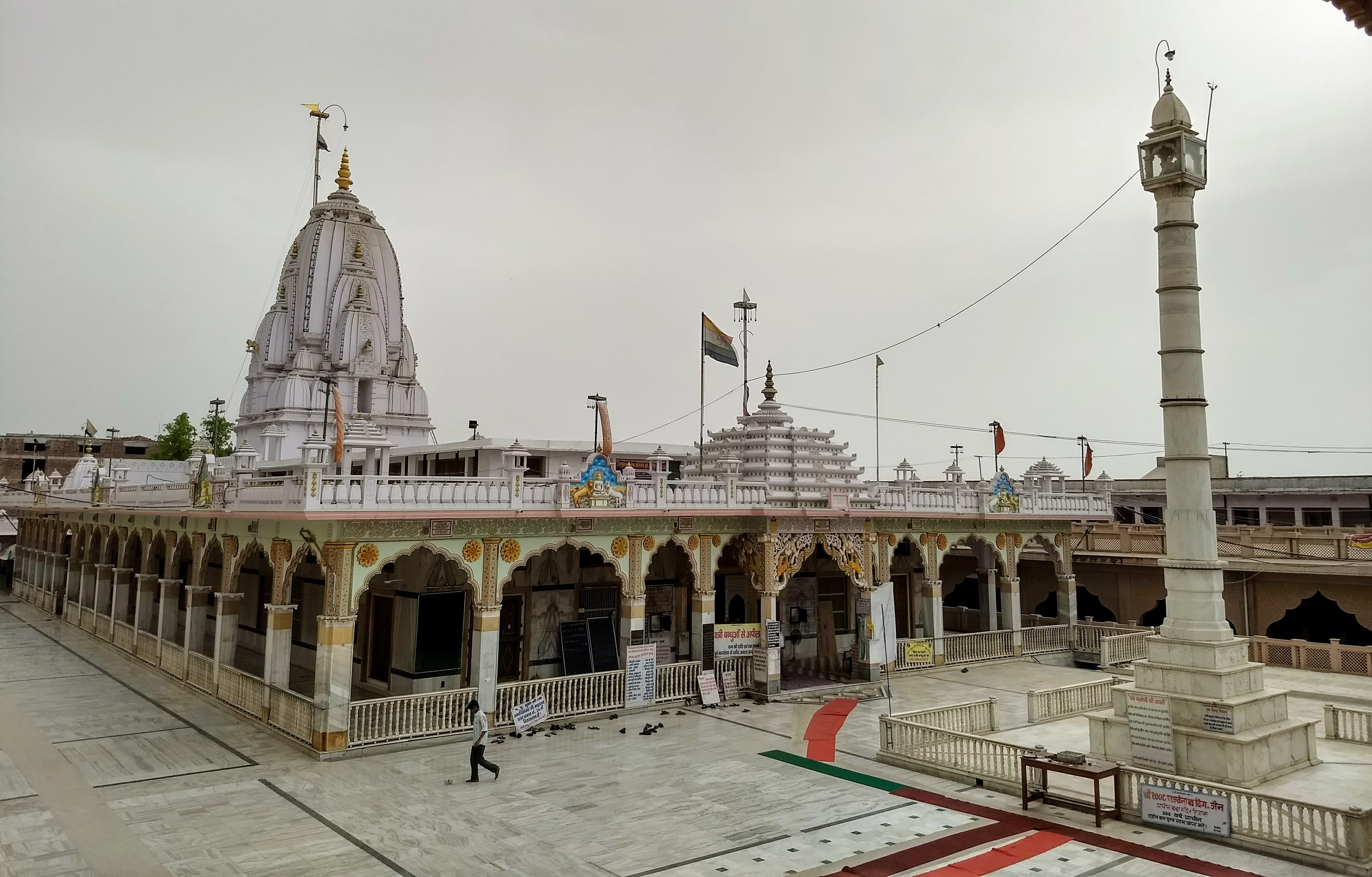
- Tijara Jain Temple

- Location in Rajasthan

Religion
- Affiliation: Jainism
- Deity: Chandraprabhu

Location
- Location: Dehra, Tijara, Rajasthan
- Coordinates: 27.93°N 76.85°E

Architecture
- Established: 1986
- Temple: 4

Tijara Jain Temple is a digambar Jain temple dedicated to Chandraprabhu. The temple is located in the hill city Tijara, in the Khairthal-Tijara district of Rajasthan, India. It is an Atishaya Kshetra (English: Place where Miracles happen). It is 55 kilometres (34 mi) from Alwar and 110 kilometres (68 mi) from Delhi. The location is a tirtha (pilgrimage site) for the Jains.

== History ==
The temple was established in 1956 following the recovery of an idol of Chandraprabha on 16 August 1956. In 1972, another 8 inches (20 cm) idol chandraprabhu in the lotus position was discovered. The white stone idol was retrieved from underground, reinforcing the belief that this place was once a Dehra, a place where Jain idols are worshipped. After the setting up of the Jain temple, the place has regained its former importance as a pilgrimage centre.

== Main temple and idol ==
The mulnayak of the temple is a 15 inches (38 cm) white marble idol of Chandraprabhu, the eighth tirthankara, in lotus position. According to the inscription, the idol was installed on the 3rd day of Vaishakha Shukla in 1497(V.S. 1554). Both the idols, with others, are installed in a rectangular temple decorated with pinnacles. The temple walls have elaborate carvings, paintings and intricate glasswork depicting various scenes of tirthankar's life and event in Jain legends. The temple is considered an important Jain center.

There is a township in the name of Lord Chandraprabha as "Chandralok City" spread in more than 100 acre, on main road.

There is a 250 years old, Parshavanatha temple situated near the main temple. Navagraha Jain Temple and Padmavati temple are also near temple complex.

== Discovery of a Suparshvanatha Idol ==
In September 2024, "Mahanagar Times" reported the discovery of five-inch-tall digambar Jain Tirthankara idol made of Ashtadhatu(an alloy of eight metals) during excavation at a house near the toll plaza in Tijara, Rajasthan. According to the report, Sachin Ahir discovered the idol approximately two and a half years earlier but did not initially inform anyone about it. He wrapped the idol in cloth and kept it concealed at his home, He also reportedly found a vessel containing what he described as ash.

The report stated that Ahir's grandmother, wife and other family members described hearing the idol's voice in their dreams, expressing displeasure at the lack of reverence shown to it. Ahir also attributed the deaths of approximately 20-25 cows during the previous year's monsoon season and further financial losses during the following Bhadrapada month to the family's failure to honour the idol. The report further stated the cloth used to wrap the idol repeatedly developed holes or tore, prompting the family to replace it approximately 20-25 times. These accounts were reported as the family's experiences and beliefs.

According to the same report, Ahir eventually published a brief post on social media. Members of the local digambar Jain community subsequently contacted the family, which voluntarily handed over the idol to the Tijara Dehra digambar Jain community and sought forgiveness for its earlier actions. The report also described an incident during the handover in which a person reportedly experienced what those present interpreted as a spiritual presence.

The idol was in a seated, lotus position, but its inscription and identifying symbols were not clearly visible. The people examining it reportedly identified a swastika symbol and, on that basis, identified the figure as a digambar Jain idol of Suparshvanatha Bhagwan, the seventh Tirthankara of Jainism. Under the guidance of Aryika Vardhaswa Nandini Mataji and her monastic group, the Tijara Dehra digambar committee subsequently installed the idol on a Manastambha.

== Gallery ==
=== Main temple ===
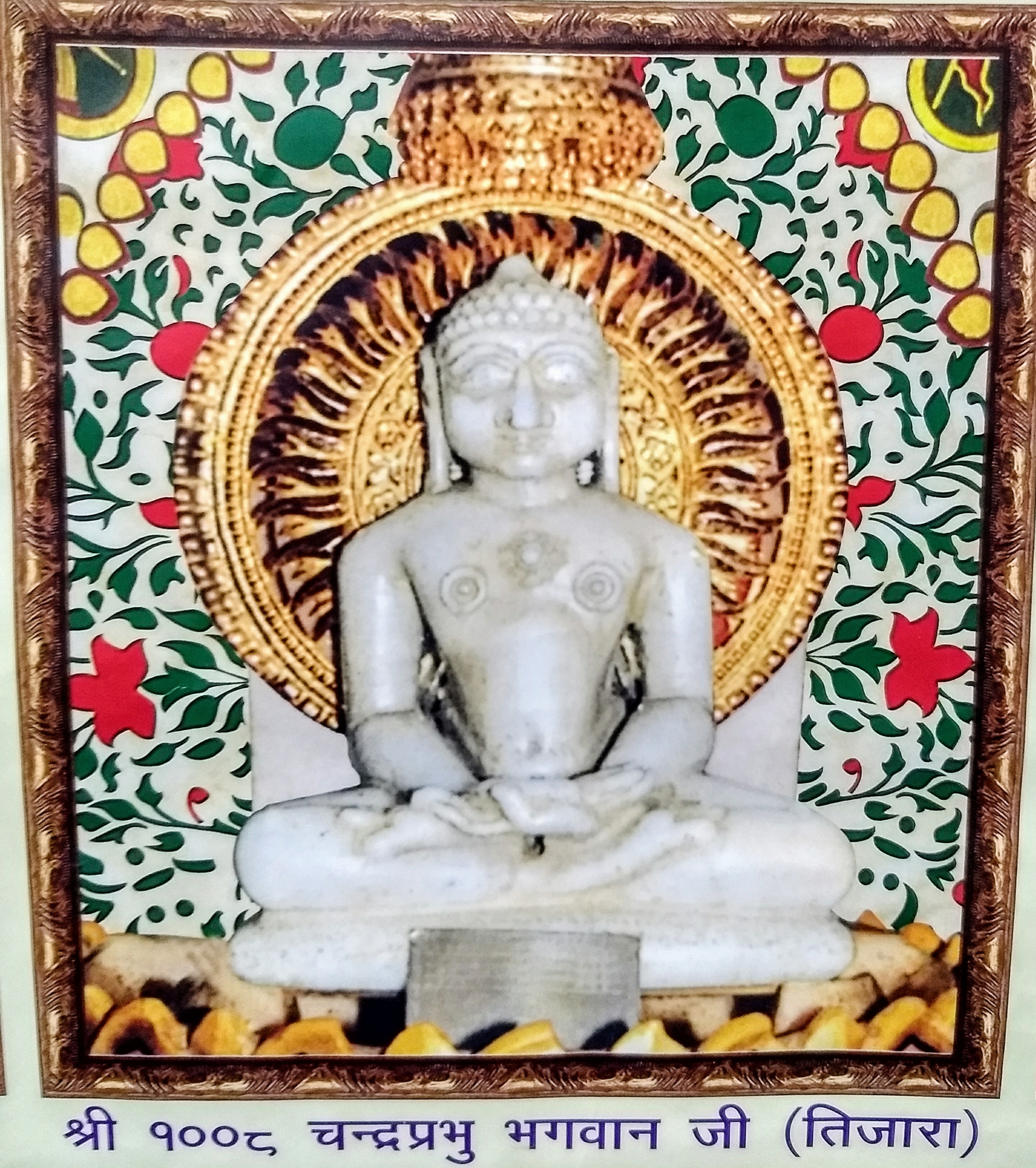
Lord Chandraprabhu

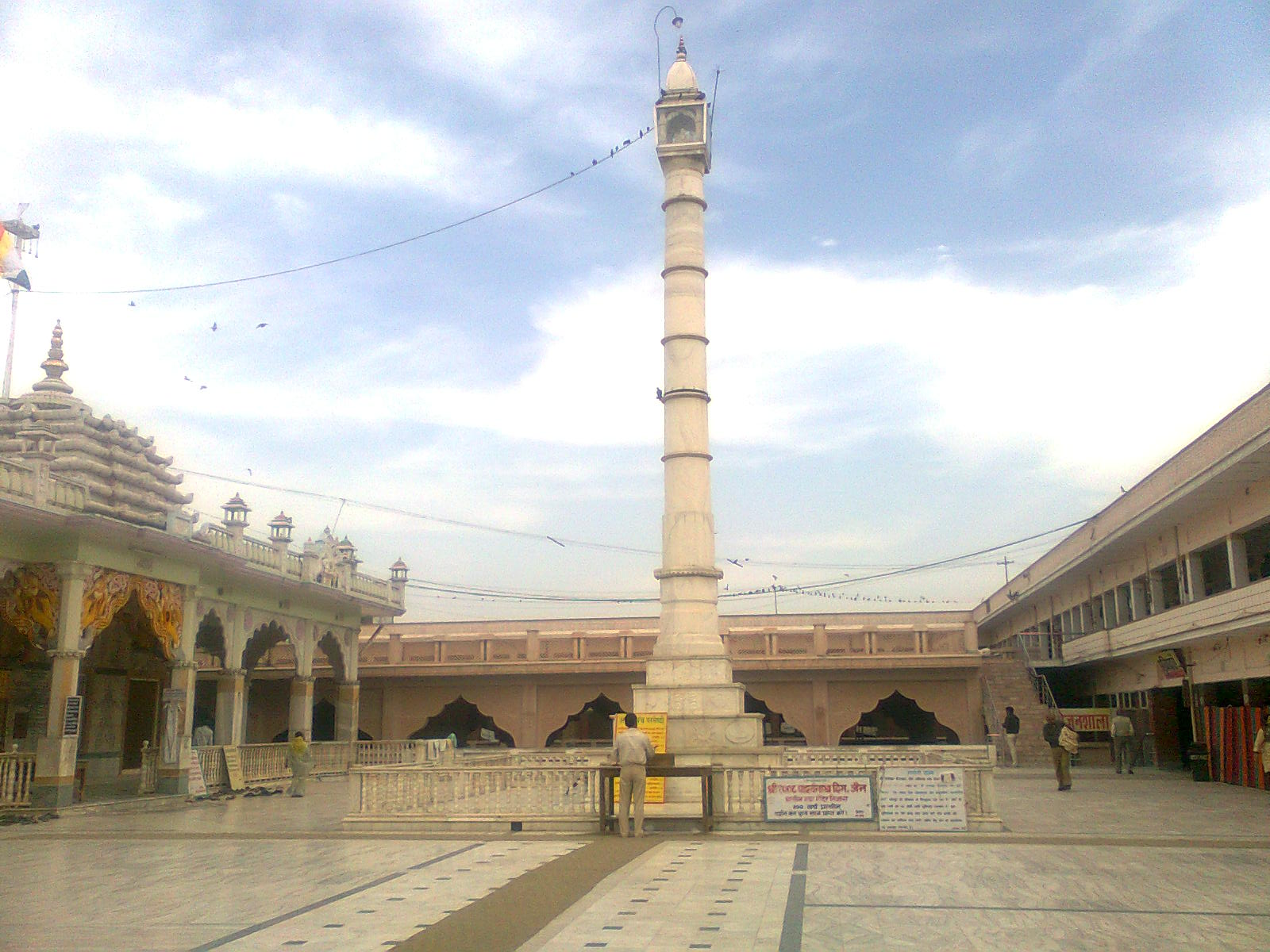
Manasthamba in the temple complex

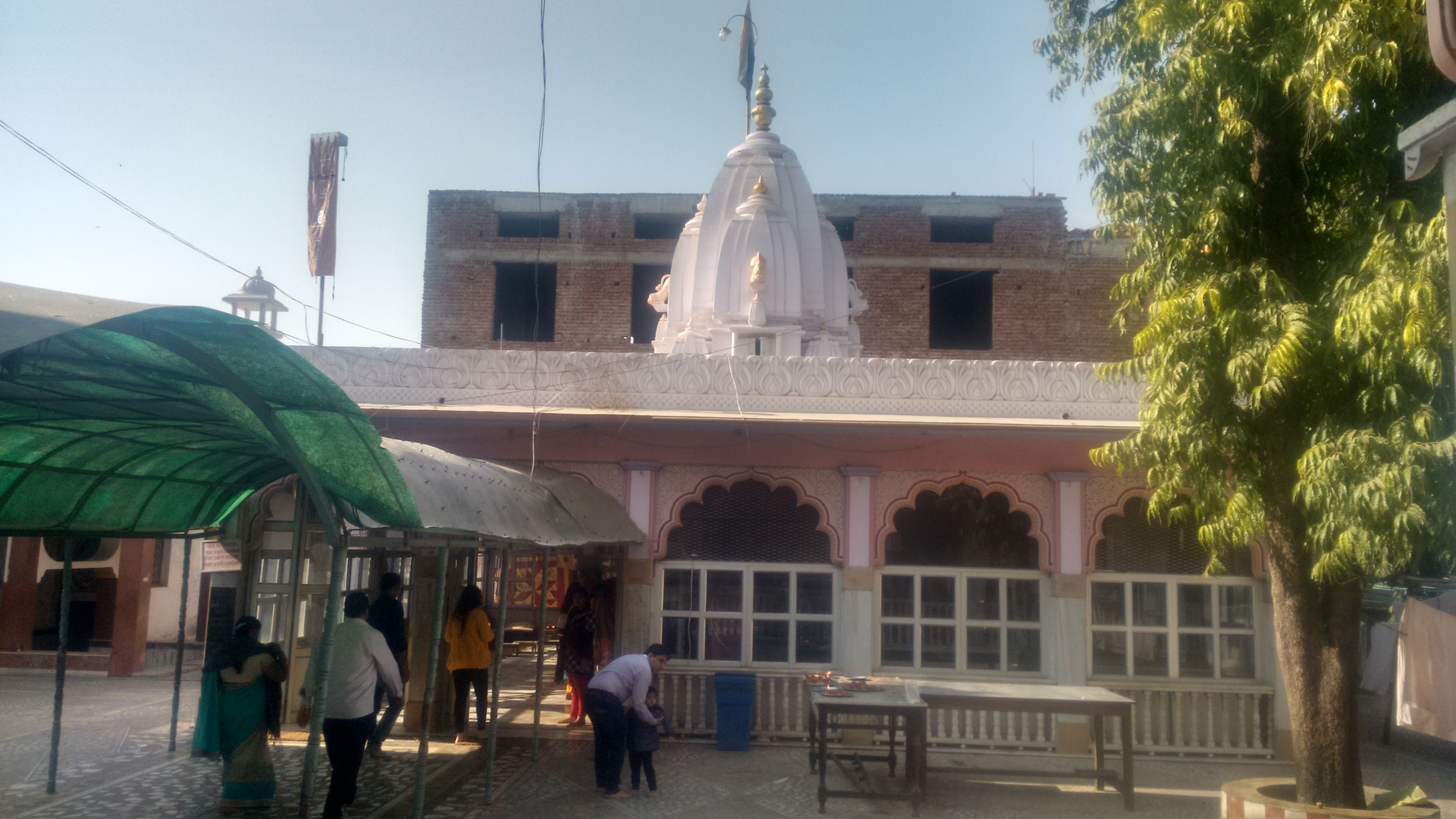
Charan at Tijara Jain Temple

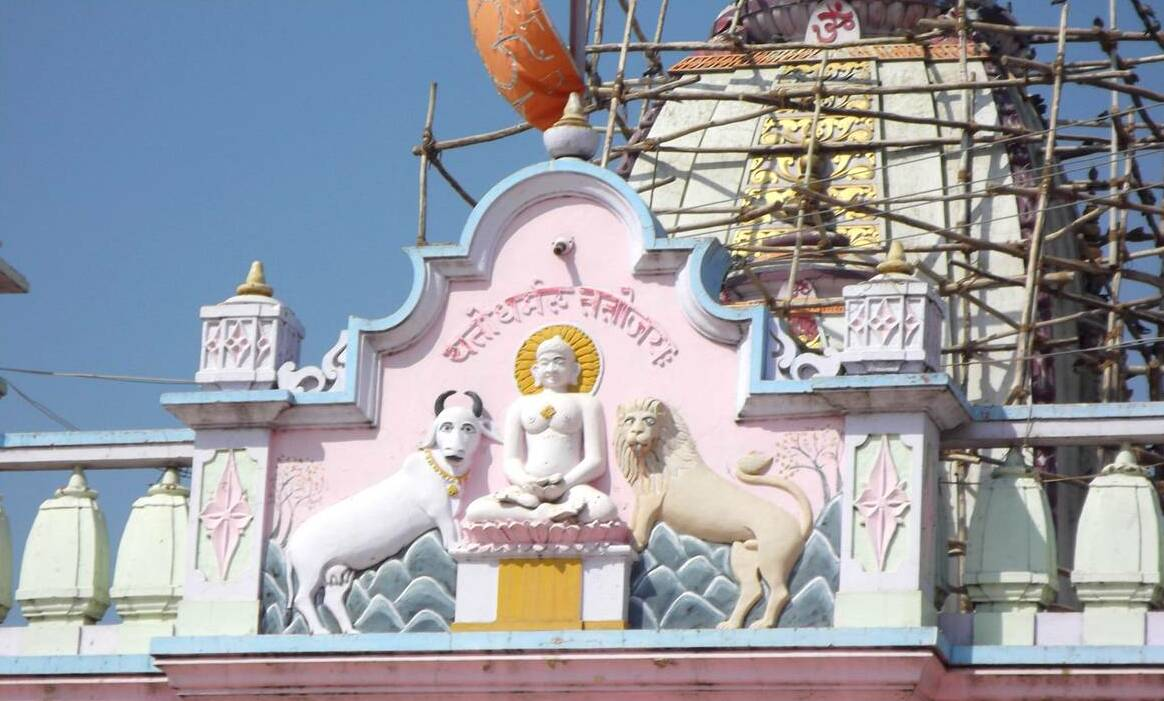
Tijara Jain temple

=== Chandragiri Vatika ===
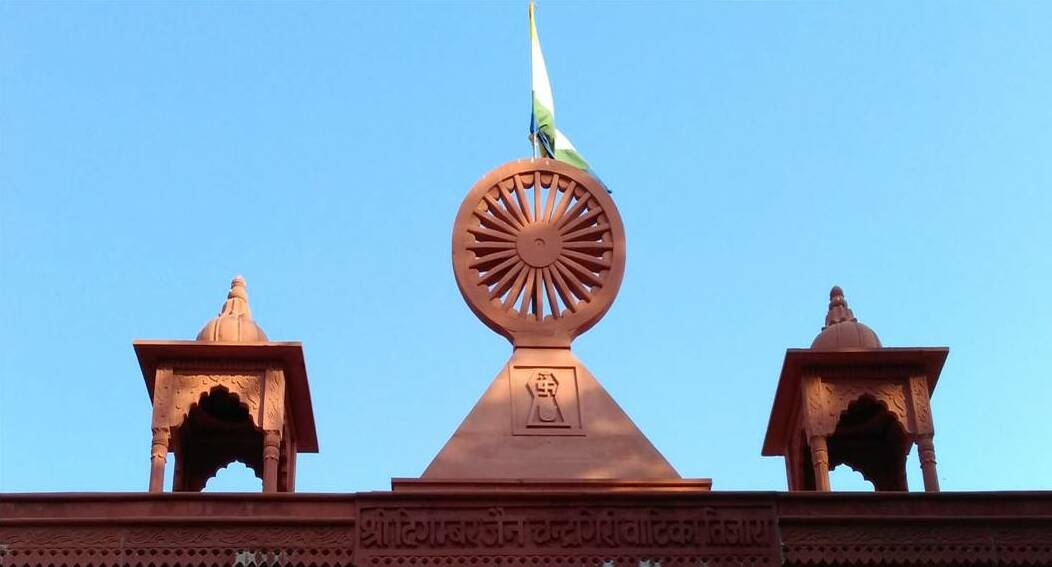
Chandragiri Vatika near the main temple

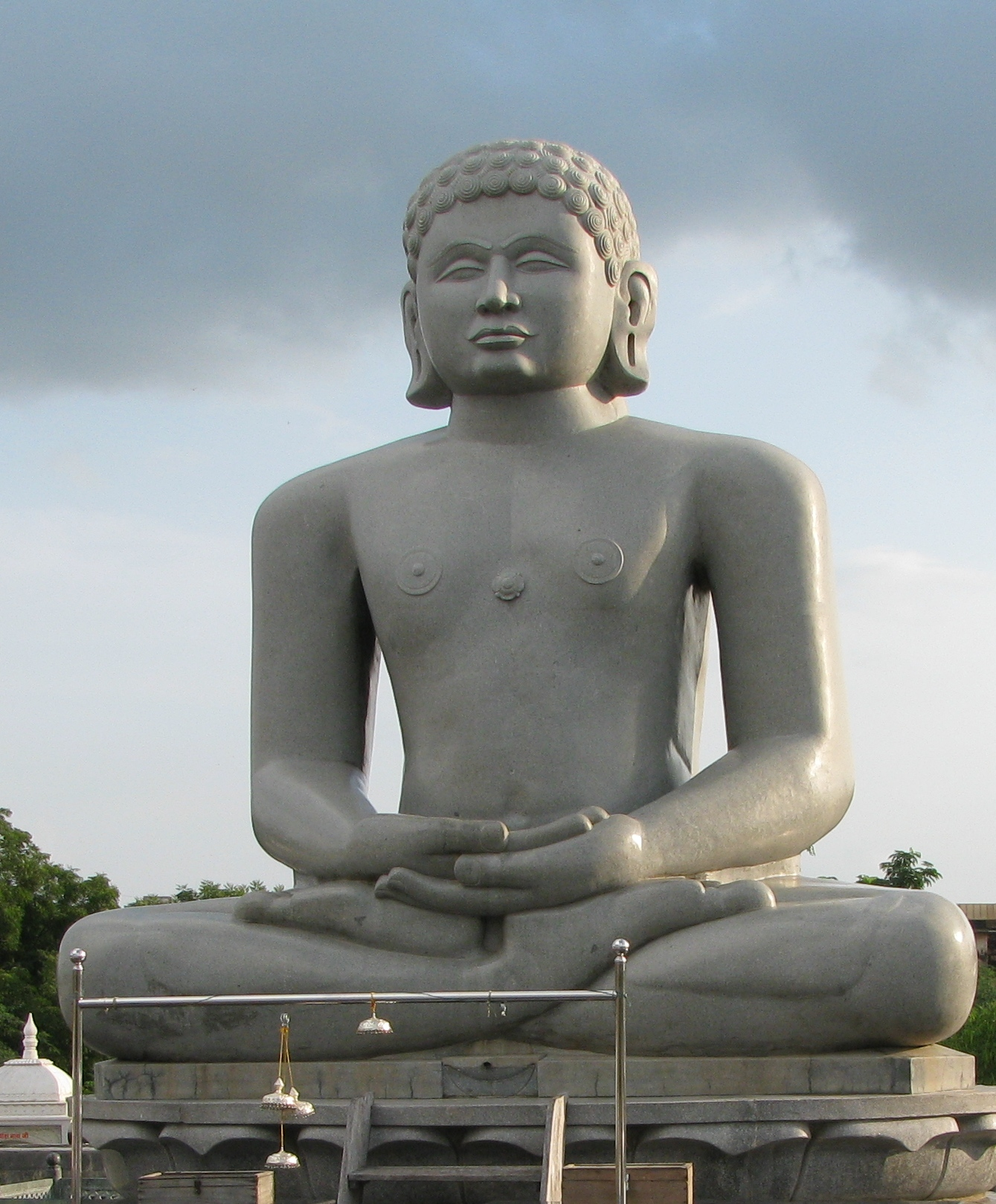
15 feet 3 inch Padmasana Chandraprabha Idol at Chandragiri Vatika made from granite stone from Karnataka

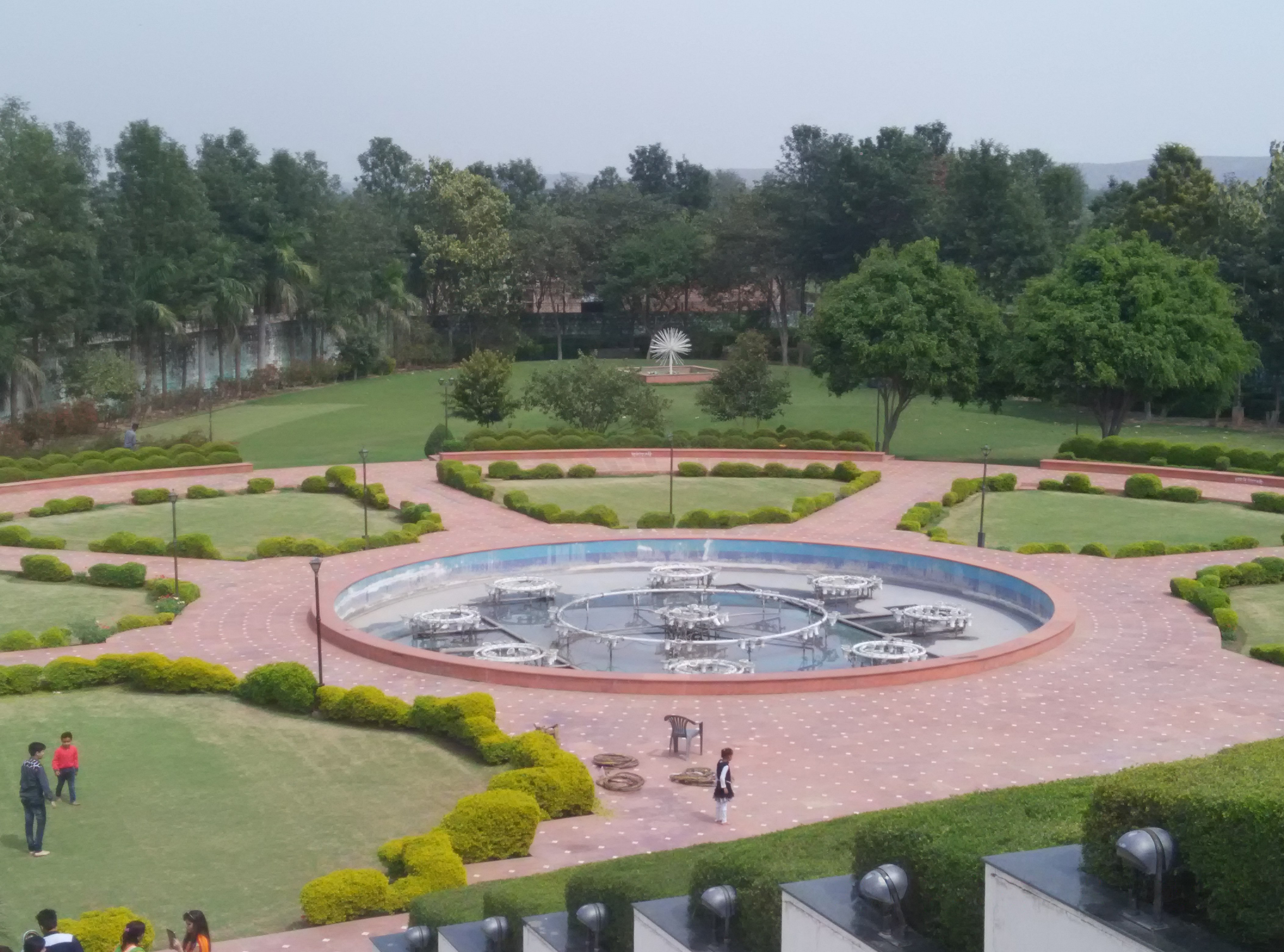
Garden

=== Other Temples ===
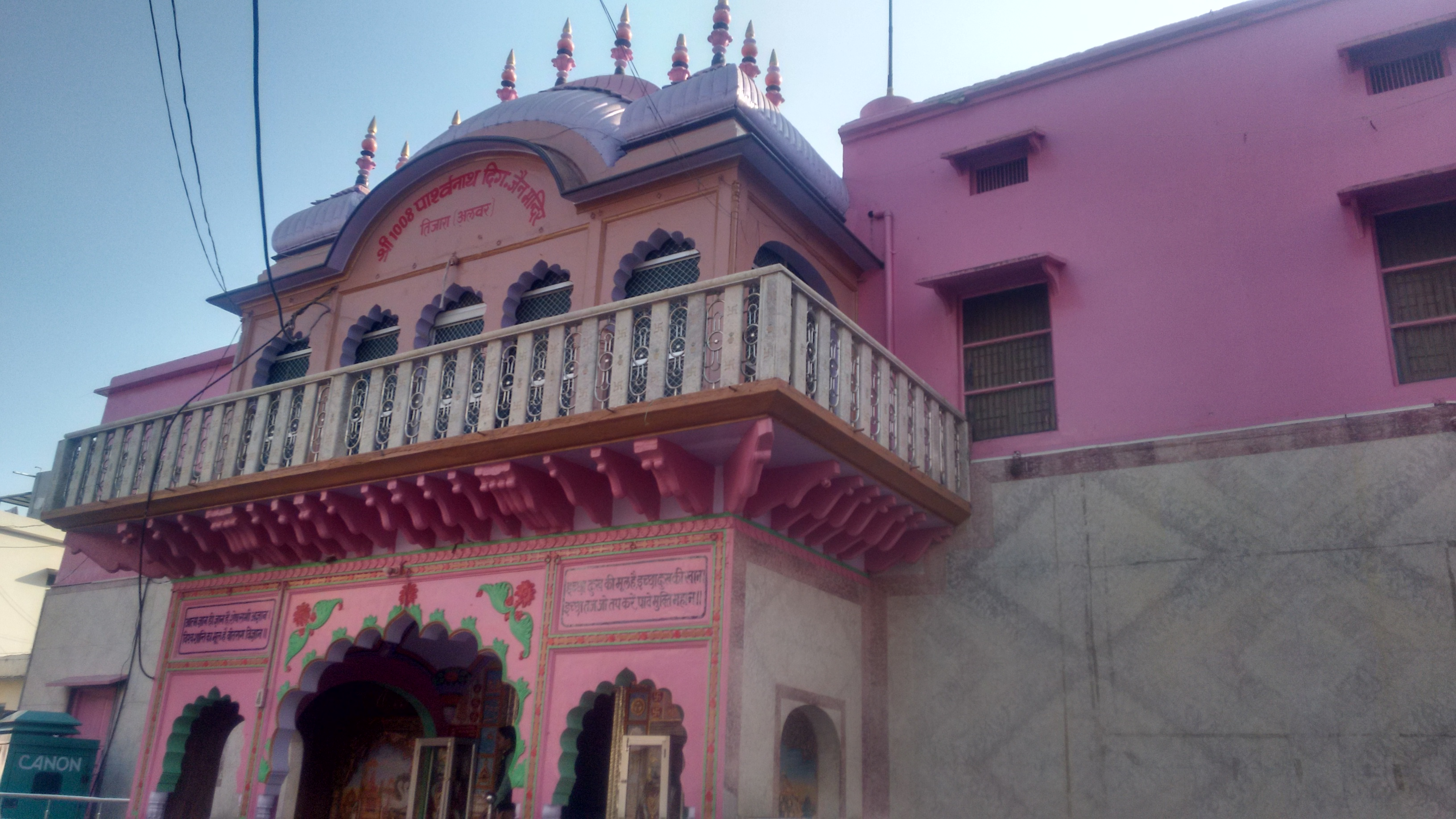
Parshvanath Temple

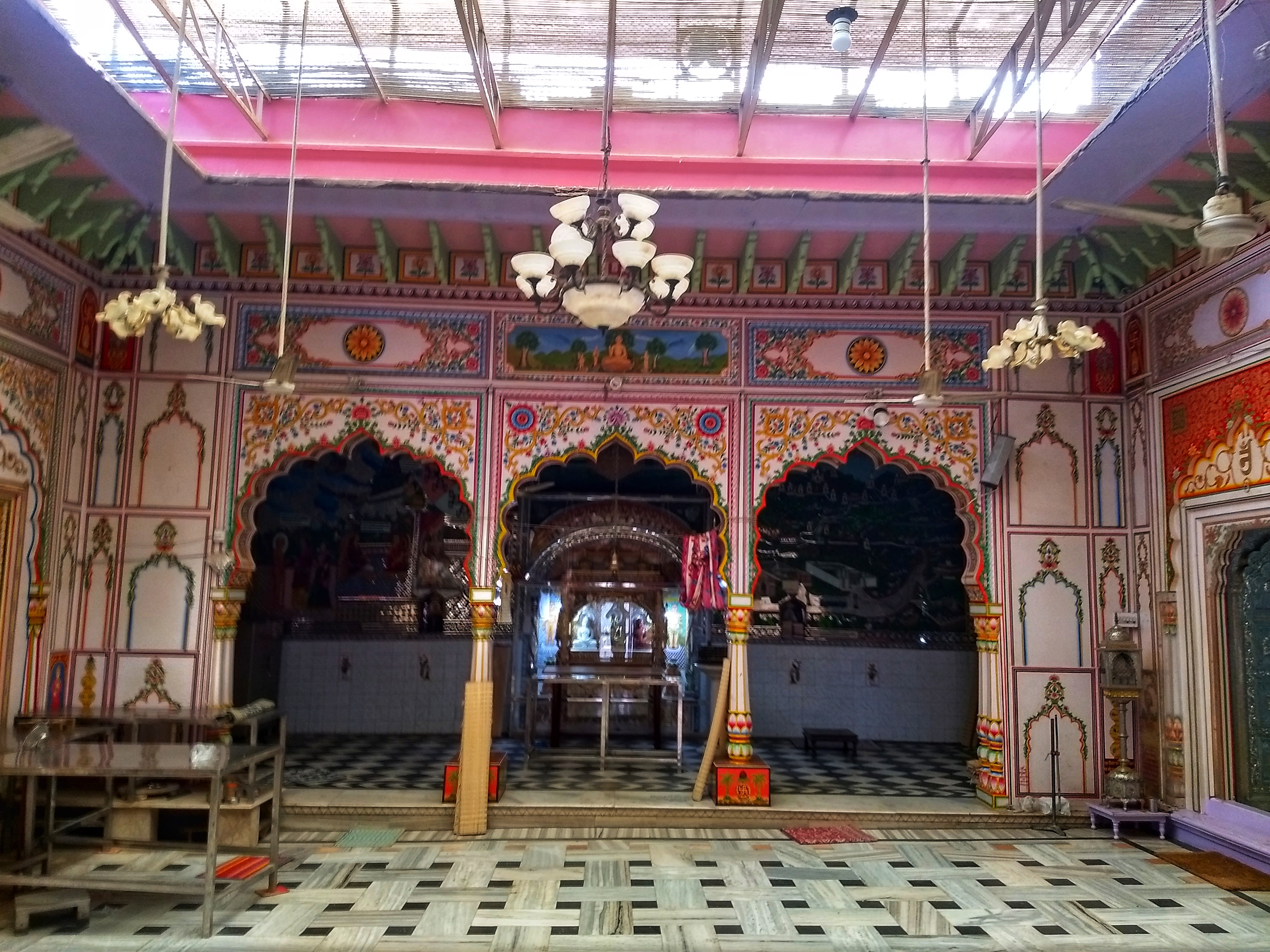
Interior of Parshvanath Temple

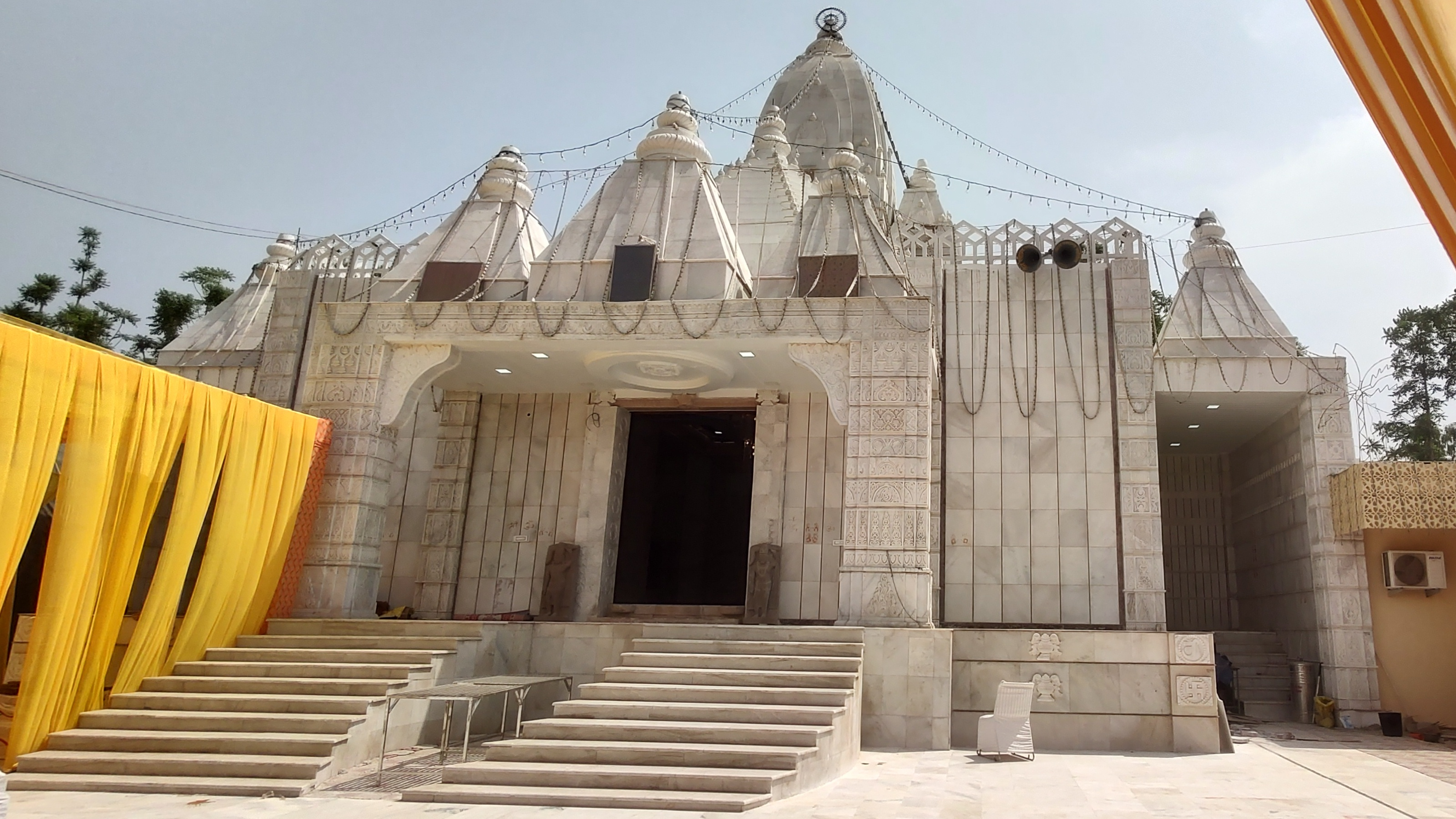
Padmavati Temple

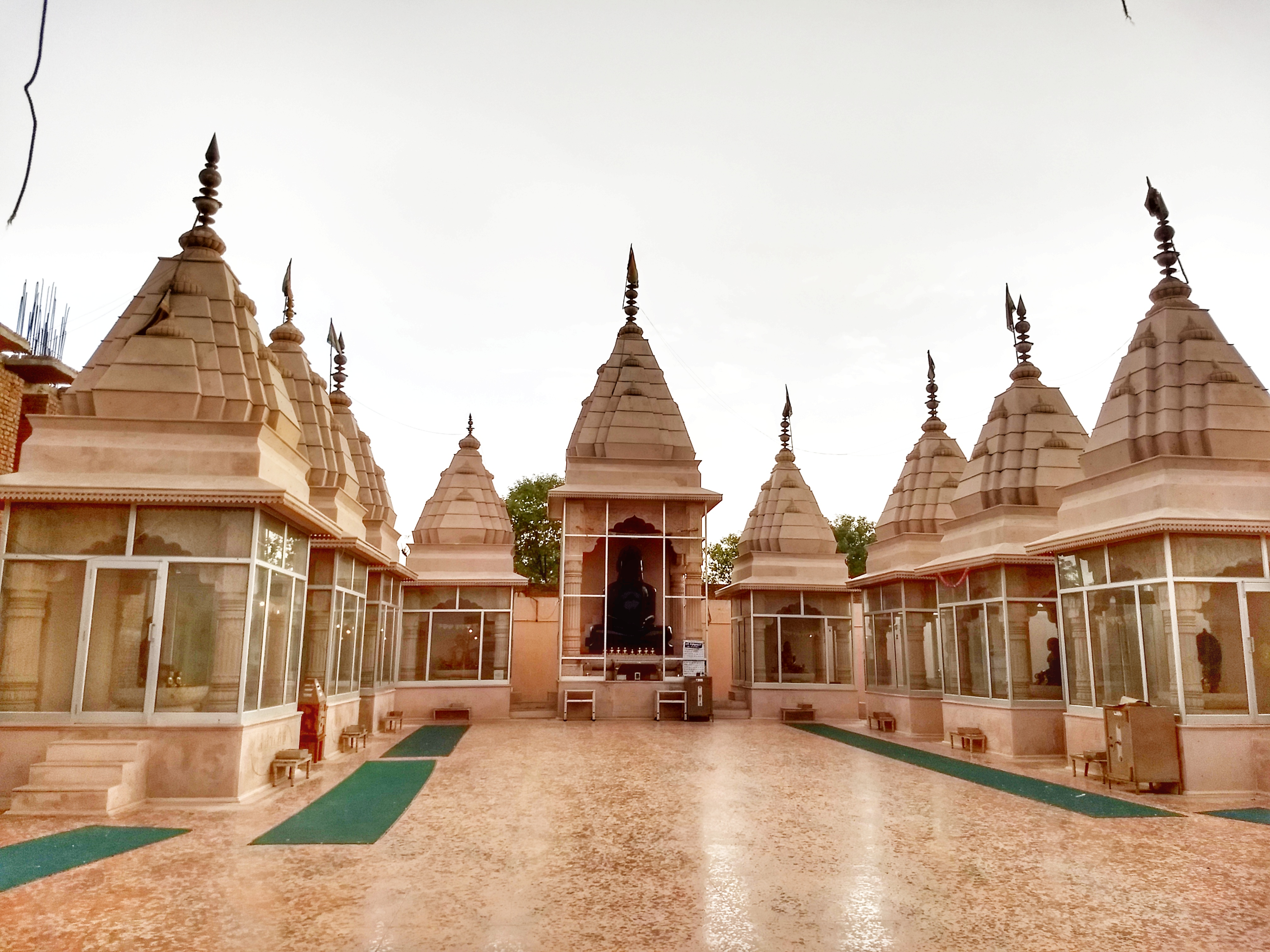
Navagraha Temple

== See also ==
- Shri Mahavirji
- Pinangwan
- Jainism in Rajasthan
