= List of tourist attractions in Varanasi =

Varanasi is one of the most prominent tourist places in India. The city attracts millions of domestic and international tourists. The temples across the city attract pilgrims. The ghats and the Buddhist site Sarnath attract tourists from abroad. Varanasi is one of the oldest cities in the world, which makes it rich with cultural heritage. The city is home to ghats, temples, and museums.

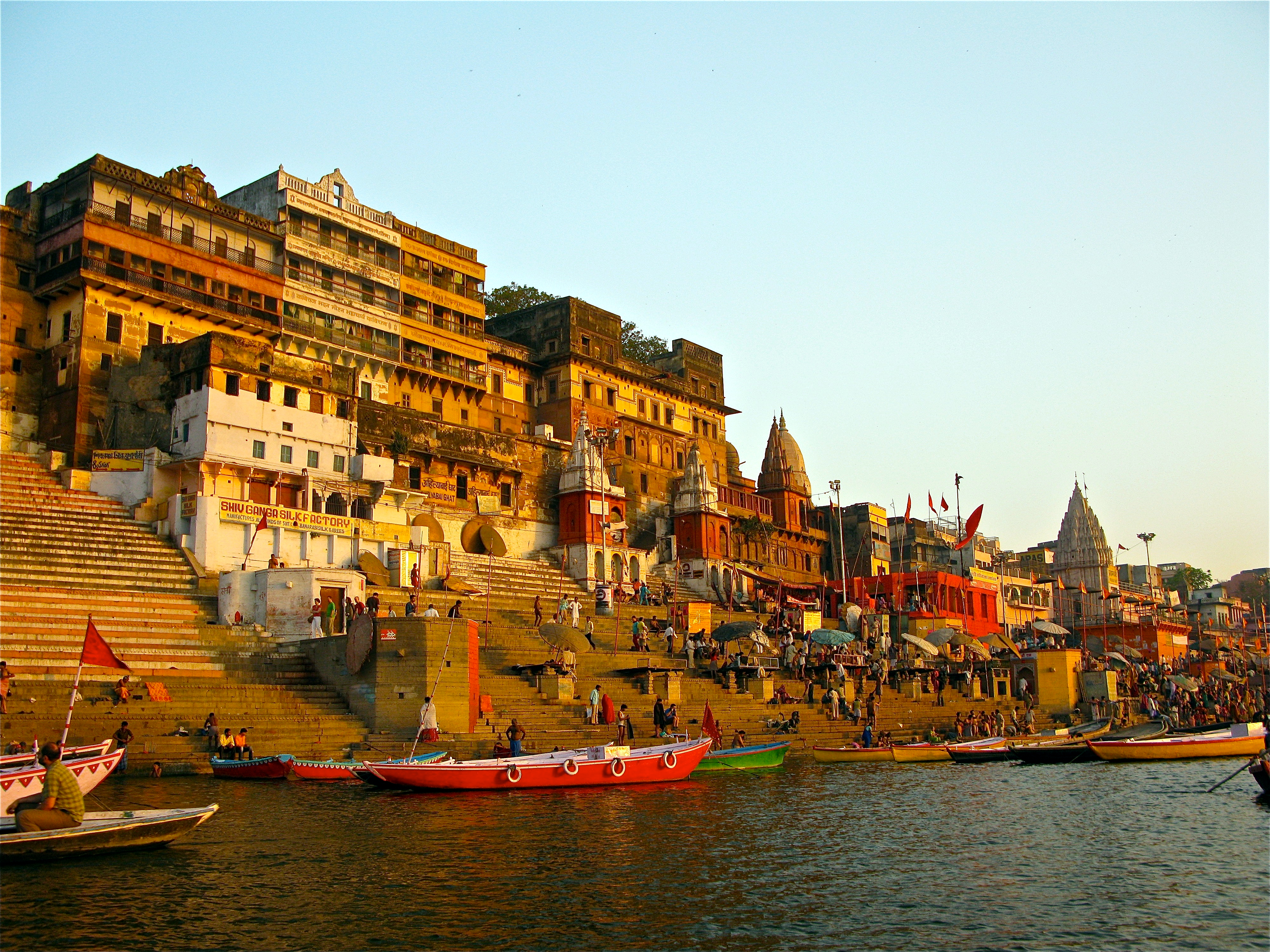
Ahilya Ghat by the Ganges, Varanasi

== List ==
Types	Picture	Attraction	Period
Temple		Kashi Vishwanath Temple	1780
Temple		New Kashi Vishwanath Temple (BHU)	1966
Temple		Bharat Mata Mandir	1936
Temple		Durga Mandir	18th Century
Temple		Tulsi Manas Mandir	1964
Temple		Sankat Mochan Mandir	16th Century
Ghat		Dashashwamedh Ghat	1748
Ghat		Assi Ghat	1988
Ghat		Manikarnika Ghat	5th Century
Ghat		Scindia Ghat	1830
Ghat		Tulsi Ghat	1941
Fort		Ramnagar Fort	1750
Mosque		Alamgir Masjid	1669
Tomb		Tomb of Lal Khan	1773
Museum		Bharat Kala Bhavan	1920
Museum		Man Mahal Observatory	1737
Park		Sant Ravidas Smarak Park	2008
Fort		Chet Singh Fort	18th Century
Cathedral		St. Mary's Cathedral	1970
Church	-	St. Thomas Church	-
University		Benaras Hindu University (BHU)	1916
Museum		Deendayal Hastkala Sankul	2017
Archaeological		Dhamek Stupa	500 CE
Temple		Sarnath Buddhist Temple	649 CE
Temple		Thai Temple	1933
Statue		Standing Buddha	2011
Museum		Sarnath Museum	1910
Archaeological	-	Chaukhandi Stupa	1589
Temple		Japanese Temple	-
Temple		Chinese Temple	-
Monastery		Cambodian Monastery	2014
Temple		Tibetan Temple	-
Temple		Burmese Temple	-
Temple		Korean Temple	-
Temple		Sri Lankan Temple	-
Temple		Shri Digamber Jain Temple	-
Temple		Golden Temple	-
Park/Zoo		Sarnath Deer Park	1956
Park		Garden of Spiritual Wisdom	-
Statue		Ashokan Pillar of Sarnath	250 BCE

== See also ==
- Hindu temples in Varanasi
- Ghats in Varanasi
