= List of films shot in Varanasi =

The following is a list of films shot in the Indian city of Benaras (Varanasi/Benares/Kashi), a hub for several film industries. Being well connected to the major cities across India makes it approachable. A small number of Bhojpuri movies are shot too. In these fictions and documentaries, the setting is usually explored through the themes of spirituality and death, traditionally associated with the place as well as the scenic location of the ghats. The history of the city, its religious importance in Hinduism and the prominence of the river Ganges are also addressed in various films. A majority of them was shot on location.

== Films ==
- Aghori (2023, Bhojpuri)
- Agnyaathavaasi
- Angrezi Mein Kehte Hain
- Aparajito (1956, Bengali)
- Banaras (2006)
- Banaras (2009, a Malayalam film)
- Banaras (2022, Kannada)
- Bas Itna Sa Khwaab Hai (2001, Hindi)
- Benares: The Hindu Heaven, released by James A. Fitzpatrick (1931, English), American travelogue
- Sarnath, Benares (1934), German anonymous documentary featurette
- Bhaiaji Superhit
- Bholaa
- Bidesiya (1963, Bhojpuri)
- Brahmāstra: Part One – Shiva
- Brahmotsavam
- Bunty Aur Babli
- Chokher Bali
- Deep River (1995, Japanese)
- Dharm
- Dream Girl
- Falimy
- Feast of Varanasi
- Forest of Bliss (1986, English), American documentary
- Ganges: River to Heaven
- Gangs of Wasseypur
- Ghatak: Lethal (1996)
- Global Baba (2016, Hindi)
- Gypsy
- Guns of Banaras
- Half Girlfriend
- Har Har Byomkesh
- Hotel Salvation (2016, Hindi)
- Jaya Ganga
- Jolly LLB 2
- Indra
- ISmart Shankar
- Issaq
- Joi Baba Felunath
- Junction Varanasi
- Laaga Chunari Mein Daag
- Maang Bharo Sajana (1980, Hindi)
- Manikarnika: The Queen of Jhansi
- Masaan (2015, Hindi)
- Mere Dost Picture Abhi Baki Hai (2012, Hindi)
- Mohalla Assi (2018, Hindi)
- Mirzapur (2026)
- Mukkabaaz
- Mulk
- Mumbai Varanasi Express
- Naan Kadavul
- Odiyan
- Projapoti (2022 film)
- Raanjhanaa (2013, Hindi)
- Ram Teri Ganga Maili (1985, Hindi)
- Retro (2025, Hindi)
- Piku
- Sange Meel Se Mulaqat (1989, Hindi)
- Setters
- Shubh Mangal Zyada Saavdhan
- Super 30
- The Curious Case of Benjamin Button
- The Eken: Benaras e Bibhishika (2025, Bengali)
- The Experiment (2010 film)
- The Last Color
- Un plus une
- Vanvaas
- 2006 Varanasi – The Untold
- Water (2005, Hindi; English)
- Yamla Pagla Deewana

== OTT Platforms ==
- Asur
- Bahut Hua Sammaan
- Bicchoo Ka Khel
- Helmet
- Mirzapur
- Madhuri Talkies
- Raktanchal
- A Suitable Boy
- UP65
- Virgin Bhasskar

== See also ==
- Category:Films shot in Varanasi
- Varanasi
- List of tourist attractions in Varanasi
