= Jain Ghat =

Ghat on the Ganges in Varanasi, India

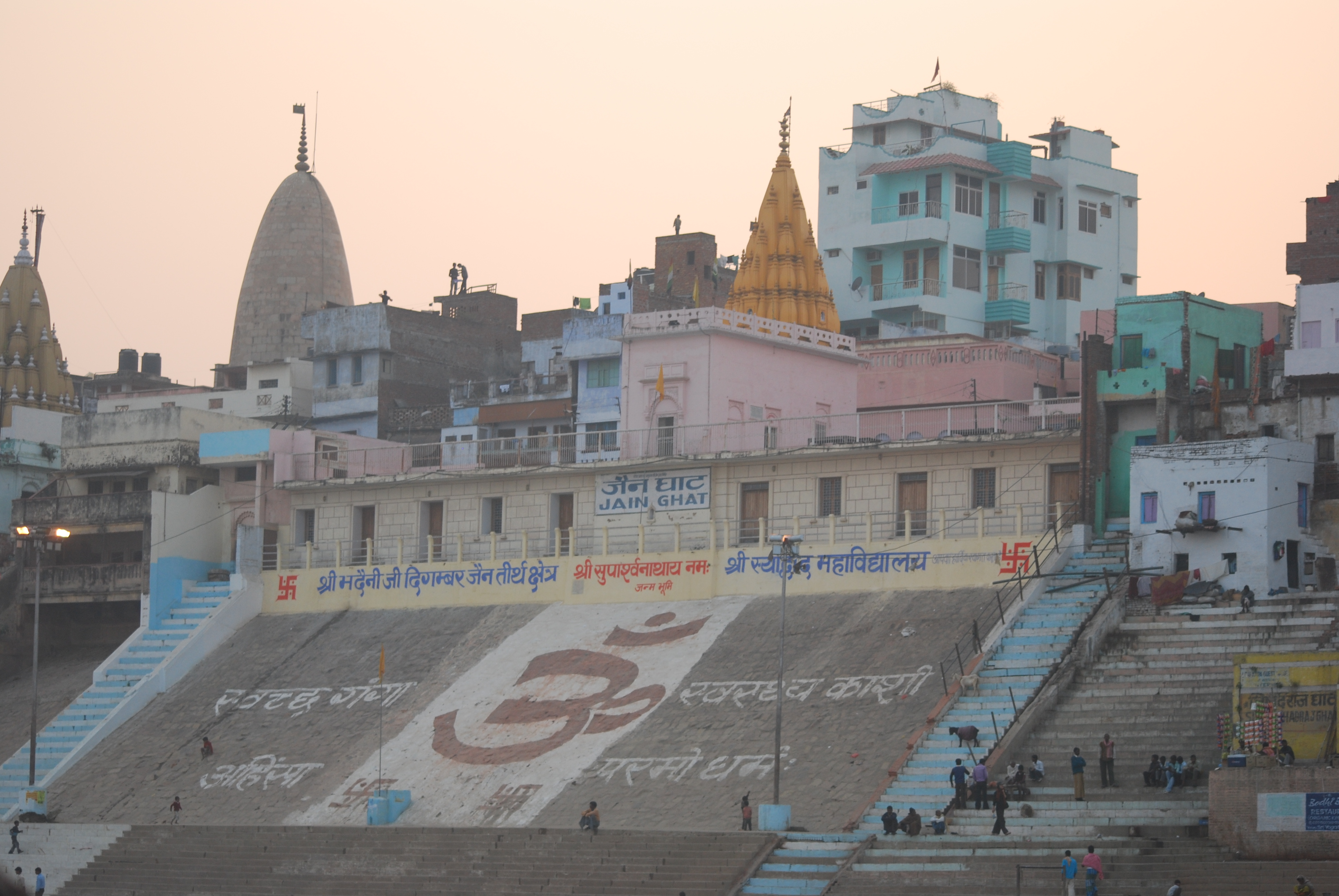
- Jain Ghat in Varanasi

Religion
- Affiliation: Jainism
- Deity: Suparshvanatha

Location
- Location: Varanasi
- State: Uttar Pradesh
- Country: India
- Interactive map of Jain Ghat

Architecture
- Established: 1931
- Temple: 3

Jain Ghat is a ghat on the banks of the Ganges in Varanasi, Uttar Pradesh, India. The ghat is associated with Jainism and Suparshvanatha.

The ghat was formerly part of the adjacent Vaccharaja Ghat. In 1931, it was developed separately and became known as Jain Ghat.

== History ==
Jain Ghat originally formed part of Vaccharaja Ghat. Vaccharaja Ghat constructed by a merchant named Vaccharaja in early 18th century. In 1931, Babu Shekhar Chanda with the Jain monks developed a separate ghat from part of Vaccharaja Ghat.

The ghat was later renovated and reconstructed by the Irrigation Department of the Government of Uttar Pradesh in 1988.

== Suparshvanatha temple ==
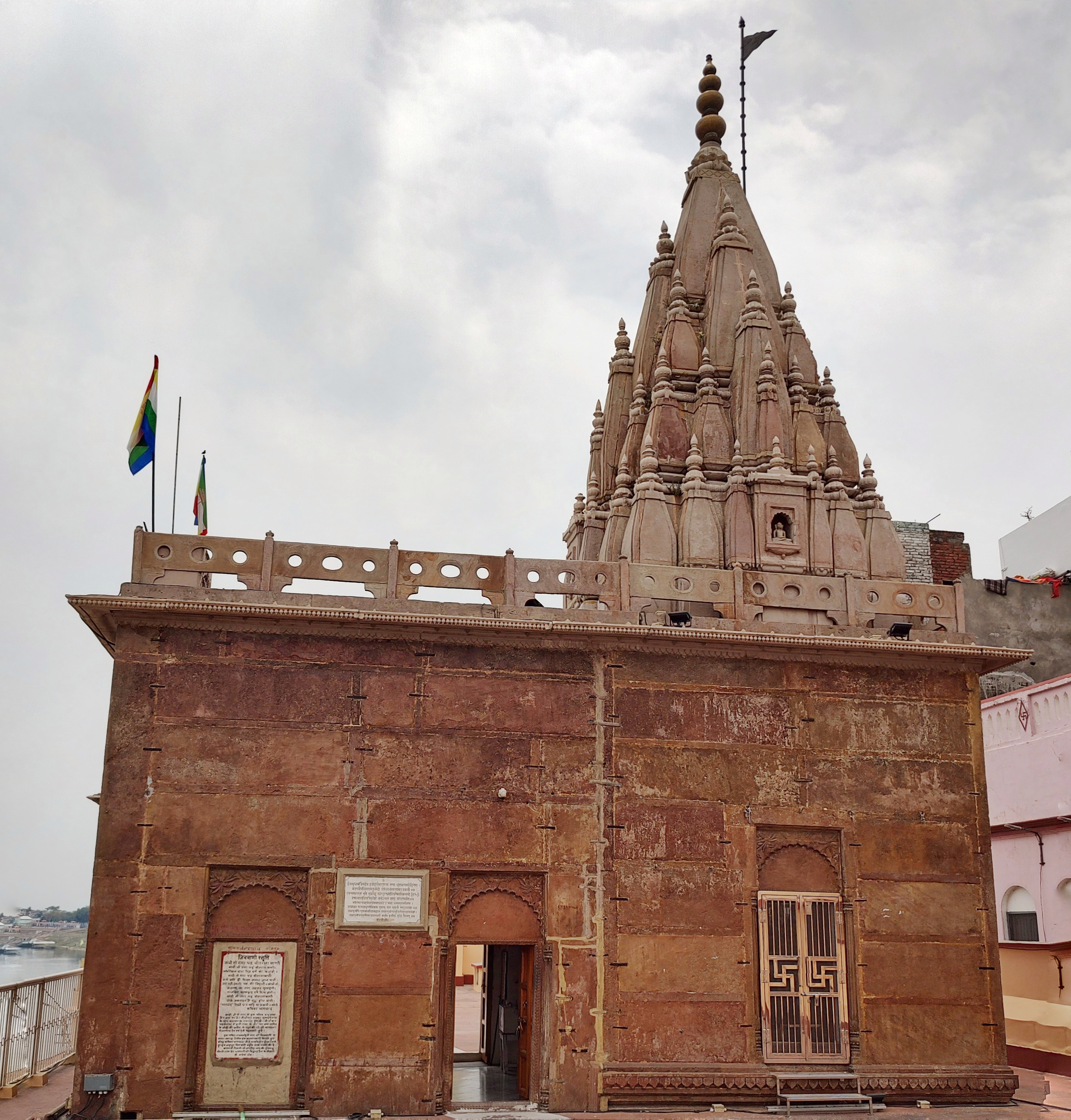
Digambara temple

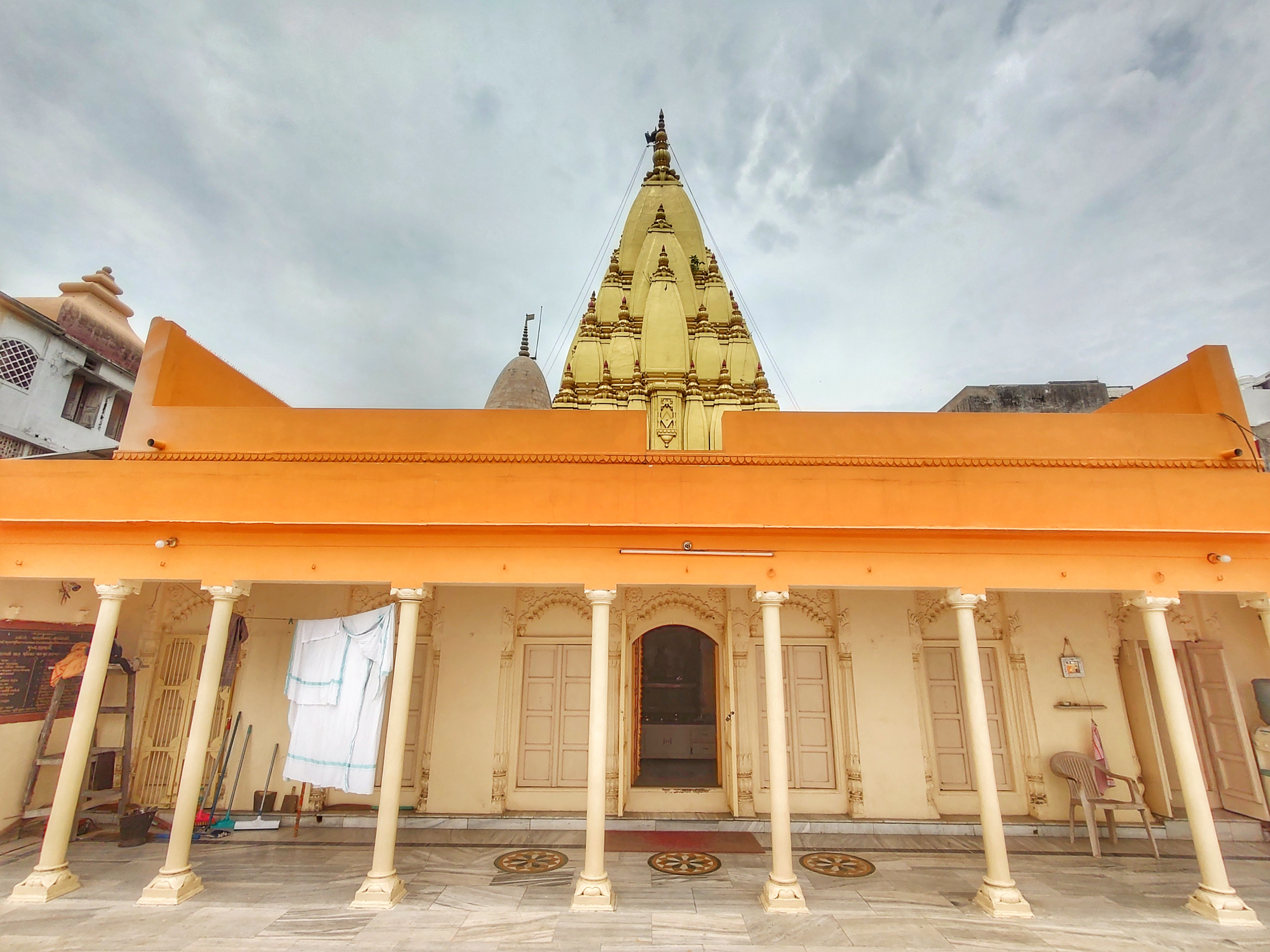
Śvetāmbara temple

A Jain temple dedicated to Suparshvanatha, stands on the upper part of Jain Ghat. The temple, was constructed in 1885, commemorates birthplace of Suparshvanatha. Varanasi is an important Jain pilgrimage centre and Jain tradition associates the city with the birthplaces of four Tirthankaras—Suparshvanatha, Chandraprabha, Shreyansanatha and Parshvanatha.

The Bhadaini–Jain Ghat area contains both Digambara and Śvētāmbara shrines dedicated to Suparshvanatha. The Digambara shrine at Jain Ghat as an elevated, dome-shaped temple.

== Religious significance ==
Jain tradition identifies the Bhadaini area with events in the life of Suparshvanatha. The site is consequently known as Bhadaini Tirth. According to Jain tradition, the site is associated with four of the five kalyanakas of Suparshvanatha—conception, birth, renunciation and enlightenment. The Śvētāmbara temple enshrines a 68 centimetres (27 in) white idol of Suparshvanatha, while the Digambara temple enshrines 46 centimetres (18 in) idol.

Jain devotees regularly perform religious activities and bathe at the southern end of the ghat.

== Relationship with Vaccharaja Ghat ==
Jain Ghat adjoins Vaccharaja Ghat and historically formed part of it. The two ghats remain closely associated with the Jain tradition concerning the birthplace of Suparshvanatha. A Śvētāmbara Suparshvanatha temple is situated at Vaccharaja Ghat, while the Suparshvanatha temple at Jain Ghat is identified by the Government of Uttar Pradesh as a Digambara temple.

== See also ==
- Ghats in Varanasi
- Parshvanath Jain temples, Varanasi
- Chandrawati Jain temple
- Sarnath Jain Tirth
