= Suparshvanatha =

7th Tirthankara in Jainism

- 7th Jain Tirthankara
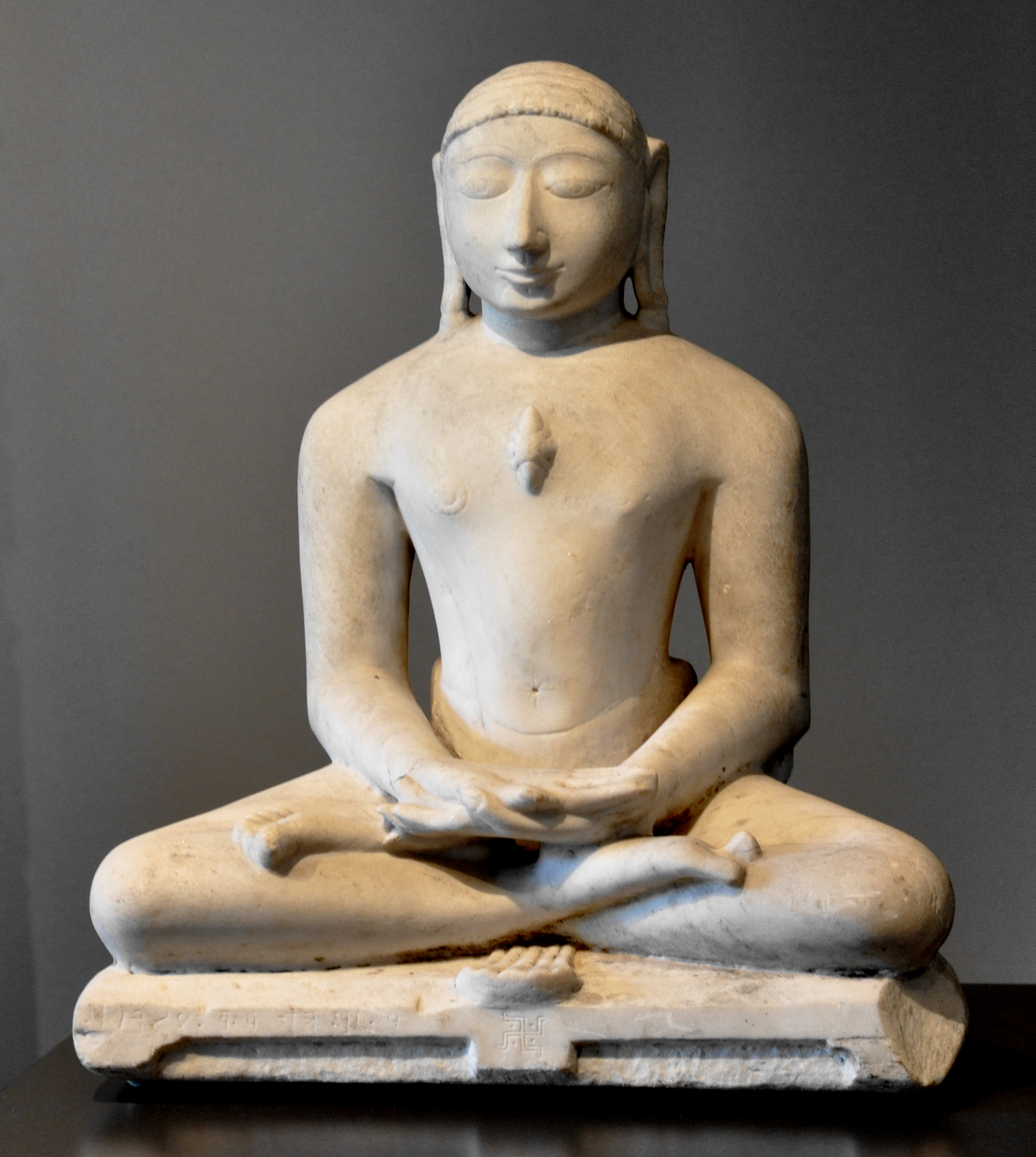
- Idol of Suparshvanatha depicting Jain iconography
- Venerated in: Jainism
- Predecessor: Padmaprabha
- Successor: Chandraprabha
- Symbol: Swastika
- Height: 200 bows (600 meters)
- Age: 2,000,000 purva (141.12 Quintillion years)
- Color: Golden

Genealogy
- Born: Varanasi
- Died: Shikharji
- Parents: Pratishtha (father); Prithvi (mother)
- Dynasty: Ikṣvākuvaṁśa

Suparshvanatha (Sanskrit: सुपार्श्वनाथ Supārśvanātha), also known as Suparśva, was the seventh Jain Tīrthankara of the present age (avasarpini). He was born to King Pratistha and Queen Prithvi at Varanasi on 12 Jestha Shukla in the Ikshvaku clan. He is said to have attained moksha at Shikharji on the sixth day of the dark half of the month of Phālguna.

== Jain biography ==
Suparśvanātha was the seventh Jain Tīrthankara of the present age (avasarpini). He was born to King Pratishtha and Queen Prithvi at Varanasi on 12 Jestha Shukla in the Ikshvaku clan. There is temple dedicated to Suparshvanatha built in Bhadaini, Varanasi to commemorate the birth of Suparshvanatha. Nine months before the birth of Suparśvanātha, Queen Prithivī dreamt the sixteen most auspicious dreams.

His height is mentioned as 200 dhanusha. He is said to have lived for 2,000,000 purva. Suparśvanātha spent 5 lakh pūrva as youth (kumāra kāla) and ruled His kingdom for 14 lakh pūrva and 20 pūrvāṇga (rājya kāla). Suparśvanātha was married and ruled after his father King Pratistha. He conducted affairs in state and looked after well being of individual.

According to Jain legends, When he observed tree leaves falling and flower wilting, he renounced his worldly life. He gave his kingdom to his son and became a Jain ascetic. After 9 months and then obtained Kevala Jnana (omniscience). After a many years of spreading his knowledge, he is said to have attained nirvana at Sammed Shikharji on the sixth day of the dark half of the month of Phālguna.

According to Jain texts Balladatta Svami was the leader of the Suparśvanātha disciples and 20 lakh years he also achieved nirvana.

Suparsvanatha is said to have been born 9,000 crore sagara after his predecessor, Padmaprabha. His successor, Chandraprabha, is said to have been born 900 crore sagara after him.

== As a historical figure ==
The Yajurveda is also said to have mentioned the name of Suparśvanātha but the meaning is different. It is an epithet of God which means "All-Pure Lord".

The Mahavagga book of the Khandhaka (1. 22. 13), a Buddhist text, mentions a temple of Suparśvanātha situated at Rajgir in the time of Gautama Buddha.

At Mathura, there is an old stupa with the inscription of 157 CE. This inscription records that an image of the tīrthankara Aranatha was set up at the stupa built by the gods. However, Somadeva Suri stated in Yashstilaka and Jinaprabha Suri in Vividha Tirtha Kalpa that the stupa was erected for Suparśvanātha.

== Adoration ==
Svayambhūstotra by Acharya Samantabhadra is the adoration of twenty-four Tīrthankaras. Its five slokas (aphorisms) are dedicated to Tīrthankara Suparśvanātha.

As an inanimate equipment (a vehicle, for example) requires an animate being (a man) for its operation, so does the body, that the soul adopts as its encasement, require the soul for its functioning. The body is repugnant, foul-smelling, perishable, and a source of anxiety and, therefore, it is futile to have attachment towards it. O Lord Suparśvanātha, this is your benign precept.

— Svayambhūstotra (7-2-32)

Suparshvanatha is associated with Nandavarta (Dig.) & Svastika (Svet.) emblem, Sirisa tree, Varanandin (Dig.) & Matanga (Svet.) Yaksha and Kali (Dig.) & Santa (Svet.) Yakshi.

== In literature ==
Supasnath Chariyam was compiled during reign of Mokkhal in 1422-23 at Dilwara.

== Iconography ==
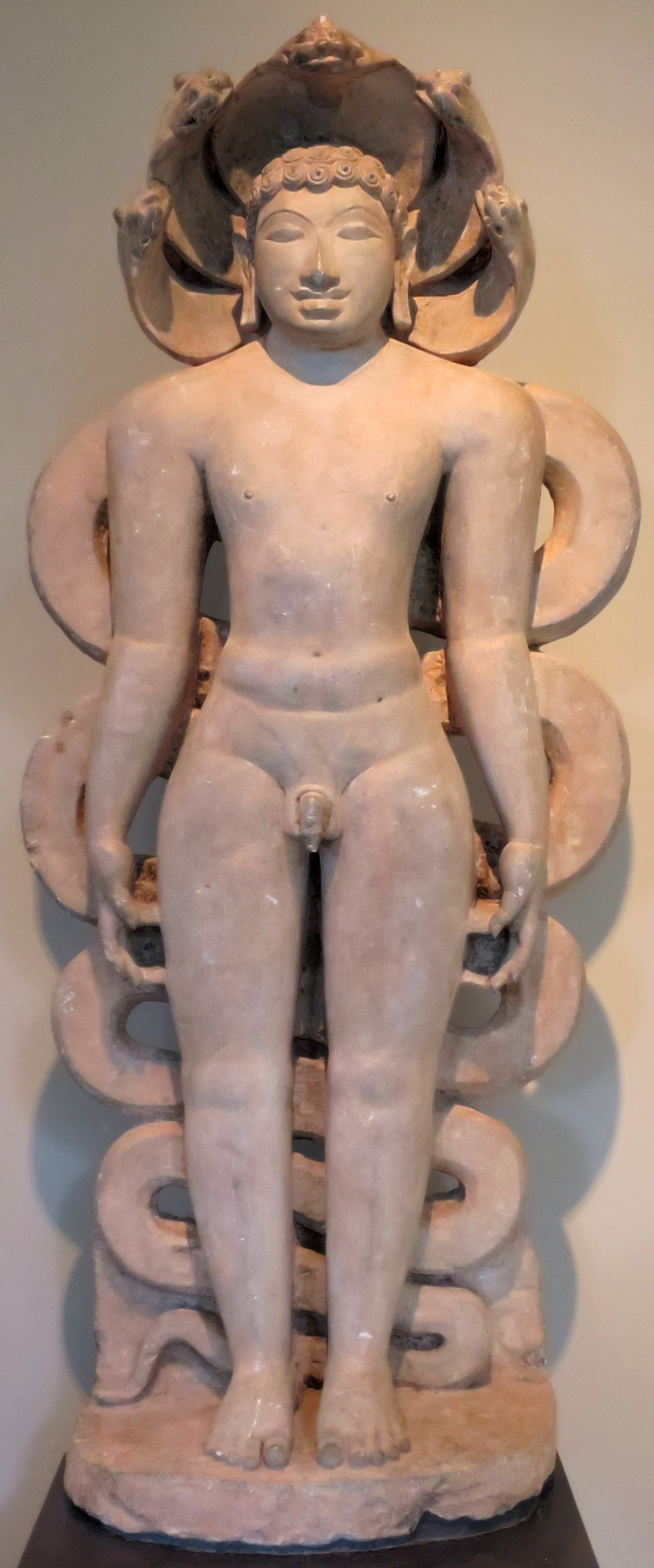
Suparsvanatha, c. 900 CE, Norton Simon Museum

Suparshvanatha is usually depicted in a lotus or kayotsarga posture. Statues and paintings show his head shielded by a multi-headed serpent, fanned out like an umbrella.

Serpent-hood iconography is not unique to Suparshvanatha; it is also found above the icons of Parshvanatha, the 23rd of the 24 tirthankaras, but with a small difference. Suparshvanatha's serpent hood has five heads, and a seven (or more)-headed serpent is found in Parshvanatha icons. Statues of both tirthankaras with serpent hoods have been found in Uttar Pradesh and Tamil Nadu, dating to the 5th to 10th centuries.

Unlike Parshvantha who is depicted with coils of snake behind the body, Suparshva is depicted with snake hood only overhead. Suparshva's emblem of swastika is carved (or stamped) beneath his legs as an icon identifier.

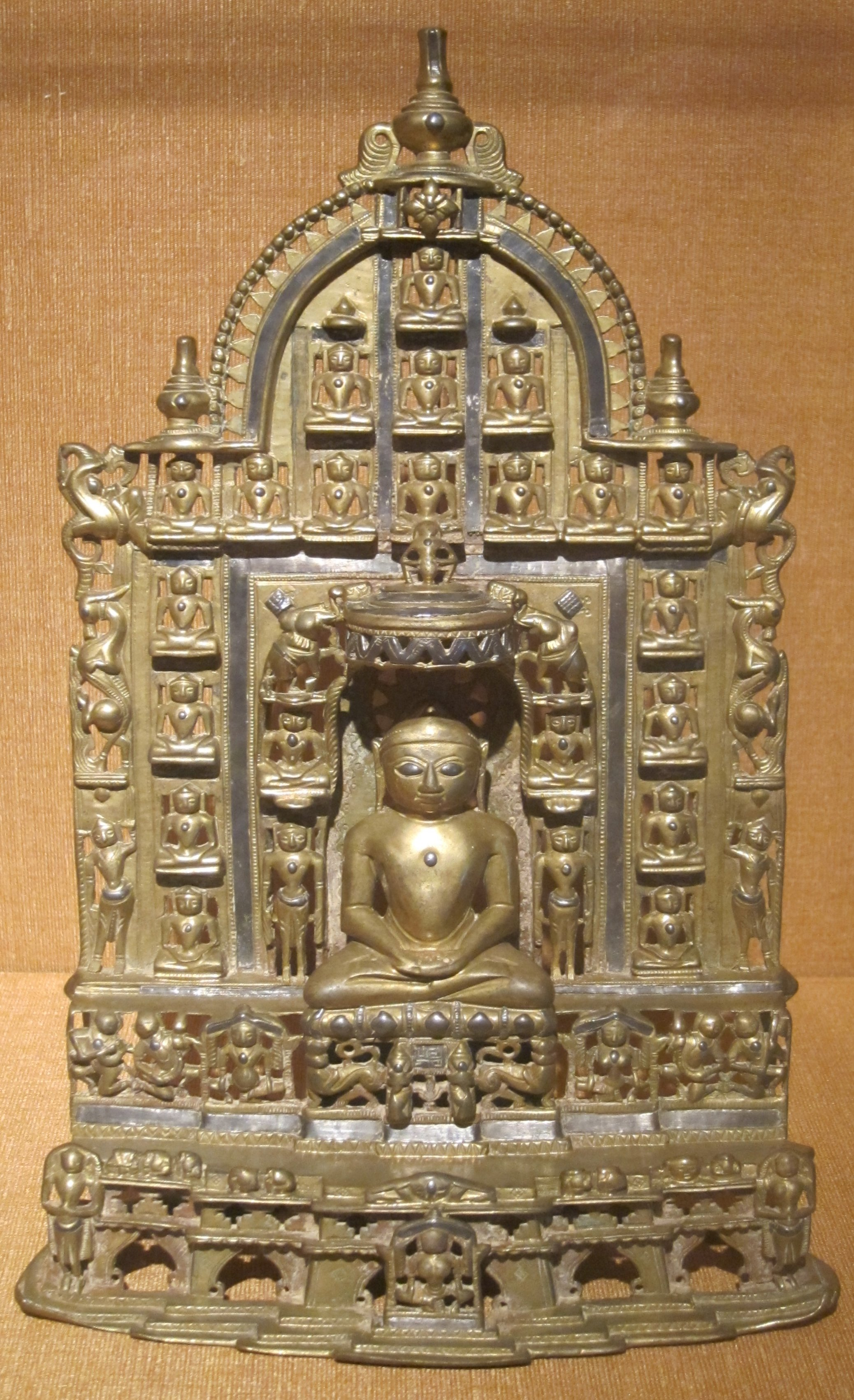
16th century bronze idol of Suparsvanatha, Honolulu Museum of Art

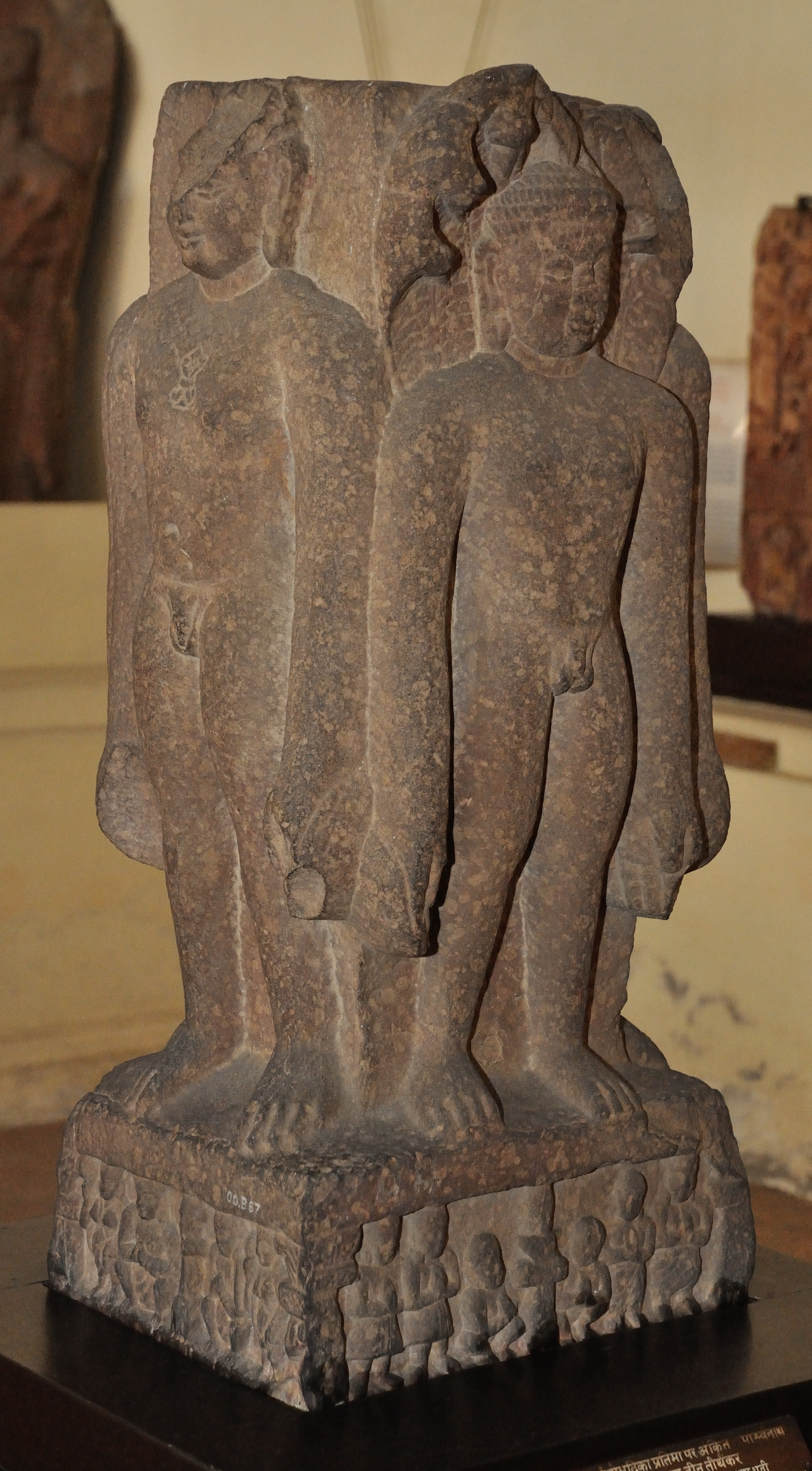
Jain chaumukha sculpture with Suparshvanath and three other Tirthankaras, 1st century

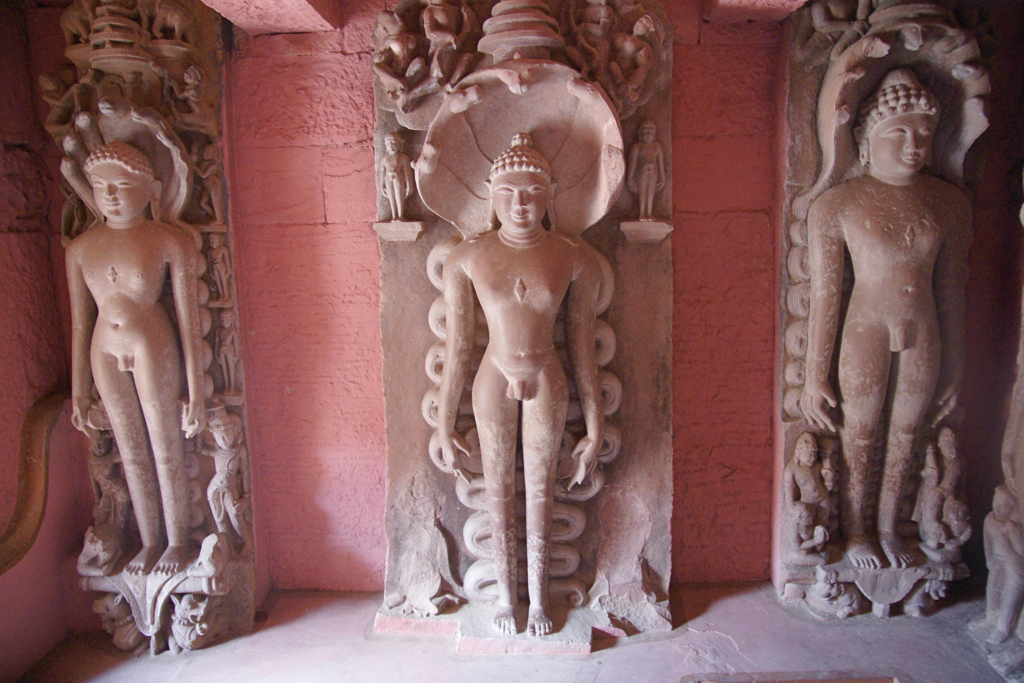
Supārśva in middle with Pārśva on both side, Jain temple, Deogarh

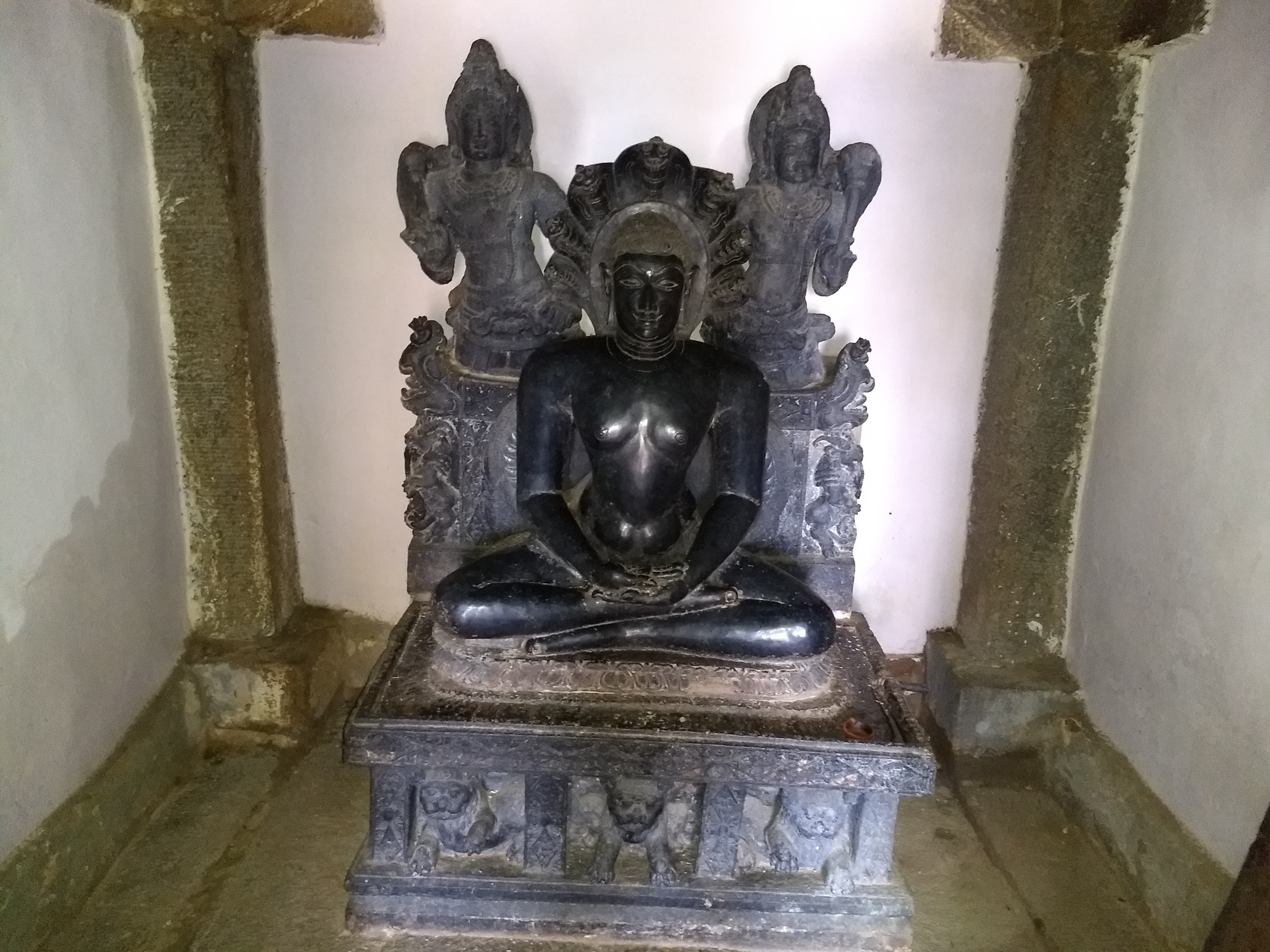
Suparshvanatha with yaksha Varanandin and yakshi Kali

== Temples and legacy ==
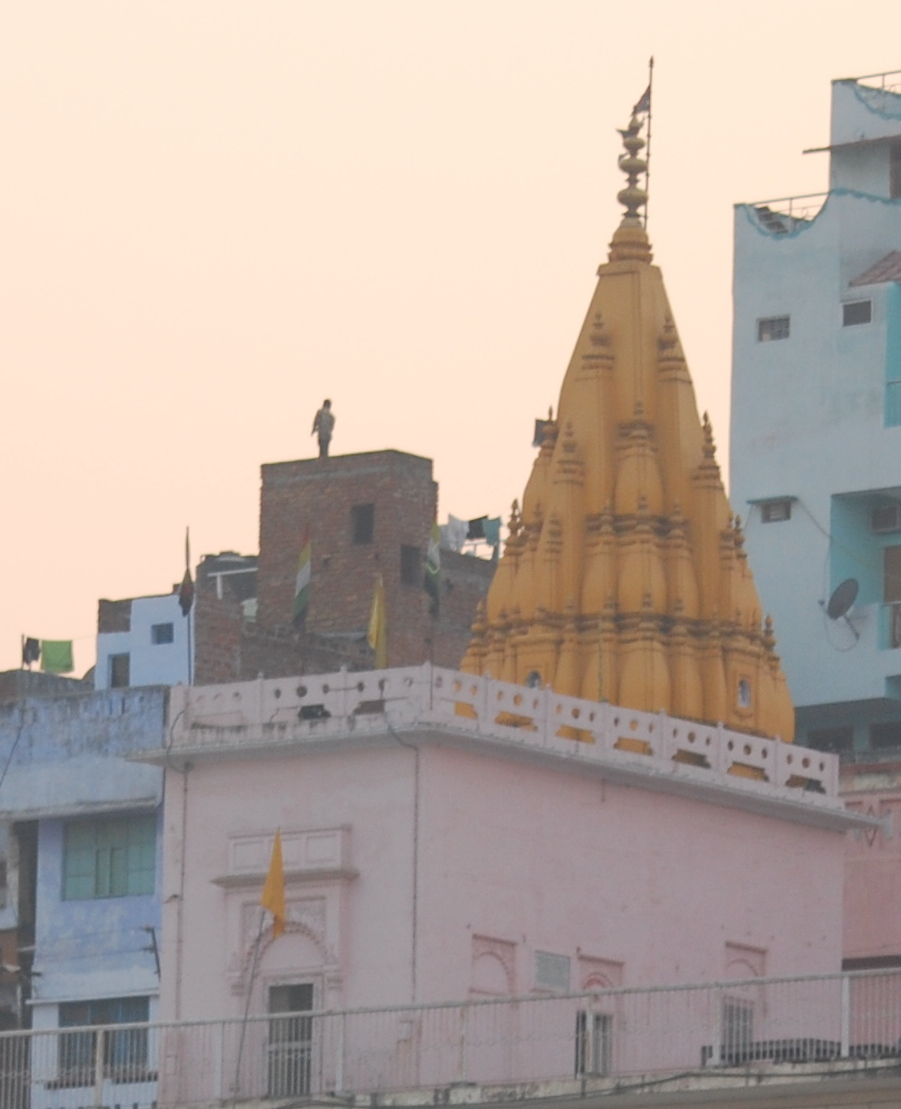
Suparshvanatha temple near Jain ghat, Varanasi

As the seventh tirthankara, Suparshvanatha is venerated across the Indian subcontinent, with numerous historically and architecturally significant temple complexes dedicated to his worship.

=== Places of birth and liberation ===
His traditional birthplace of Varanasi—specifically the Bhadaini neighborhood and the adjacent Jain Ghat—serves as a primary geographic epicenter for his devotees, housing major shrines that commemorate his early life and spiritual renunciation.

=== Other temples ===
In western India, a Suparshvanatha temple dedicated to him is located within the UNESCO World Heritage Site of the Champaner-Pavagadh Archaeological Park in Gujarat. Further inland, the Shri Mandavagadh Teerth in the ancient fortress city of Mandu, Madhya Pradesh, operates as a significant regional pilgrimage center for the Jain community.

In Rajasthan, Suparshvanatha is the primary deity of a celebrated 15th-century temple within the renowned Ranakpur Jain temple complex, which is heavily noted for its intricate stone architecture. The state also houses the ancient Suparshvanatha Jain Basadi in Narlai, a historically significant structural shrine that epigraphic evidence and historical records indicate is over a millennium old.

The veneration of Suparshvanatha extends deep into southern India as well, particularly within the Digambara tradition. Prominent southern monuments dedicated to him include historic stone shrines (basadis) located at the major monastic center of Shravanabelagola and the Mandaragiri hills in Karnataka.

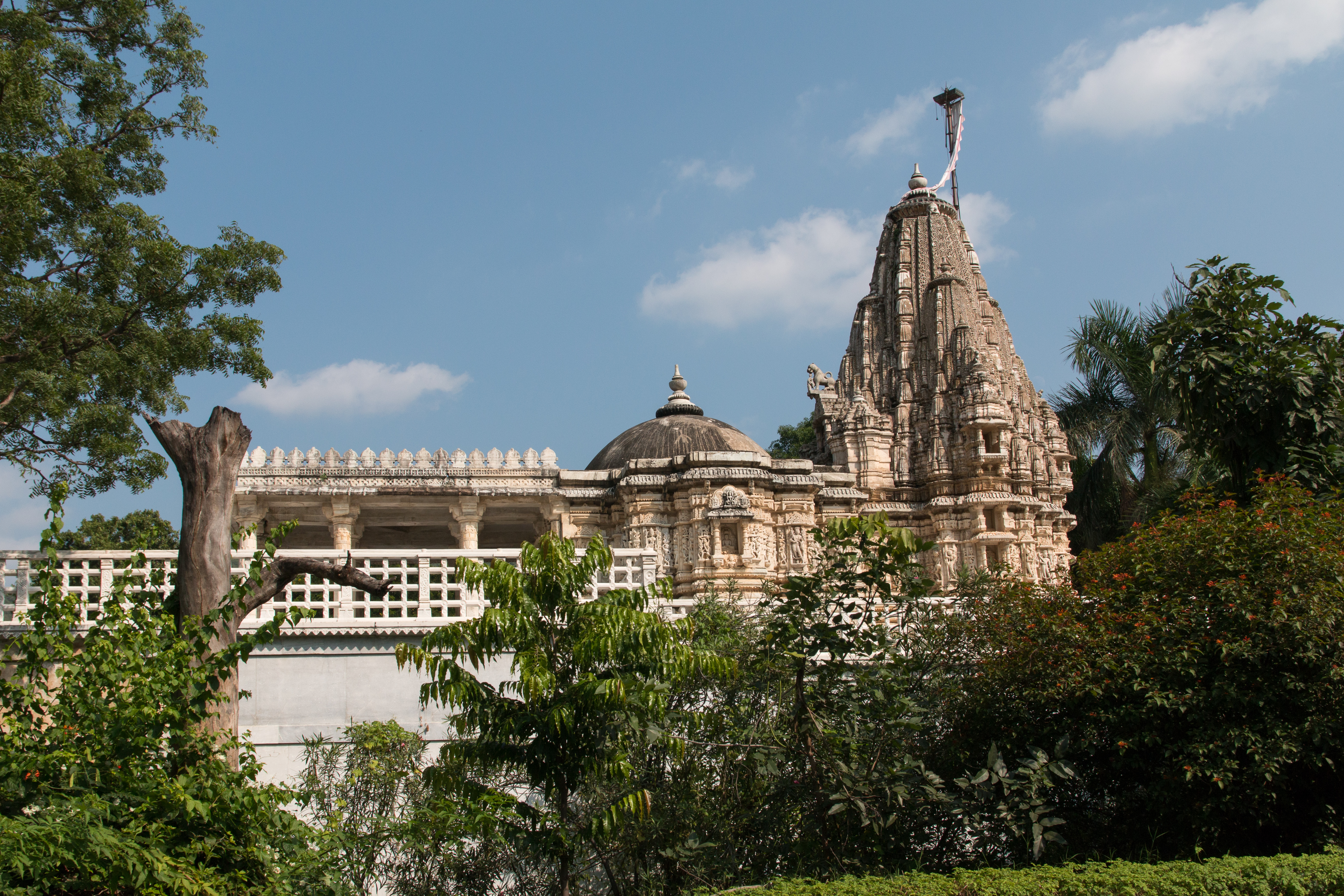
Suparshavanath Temple at Ranakpur

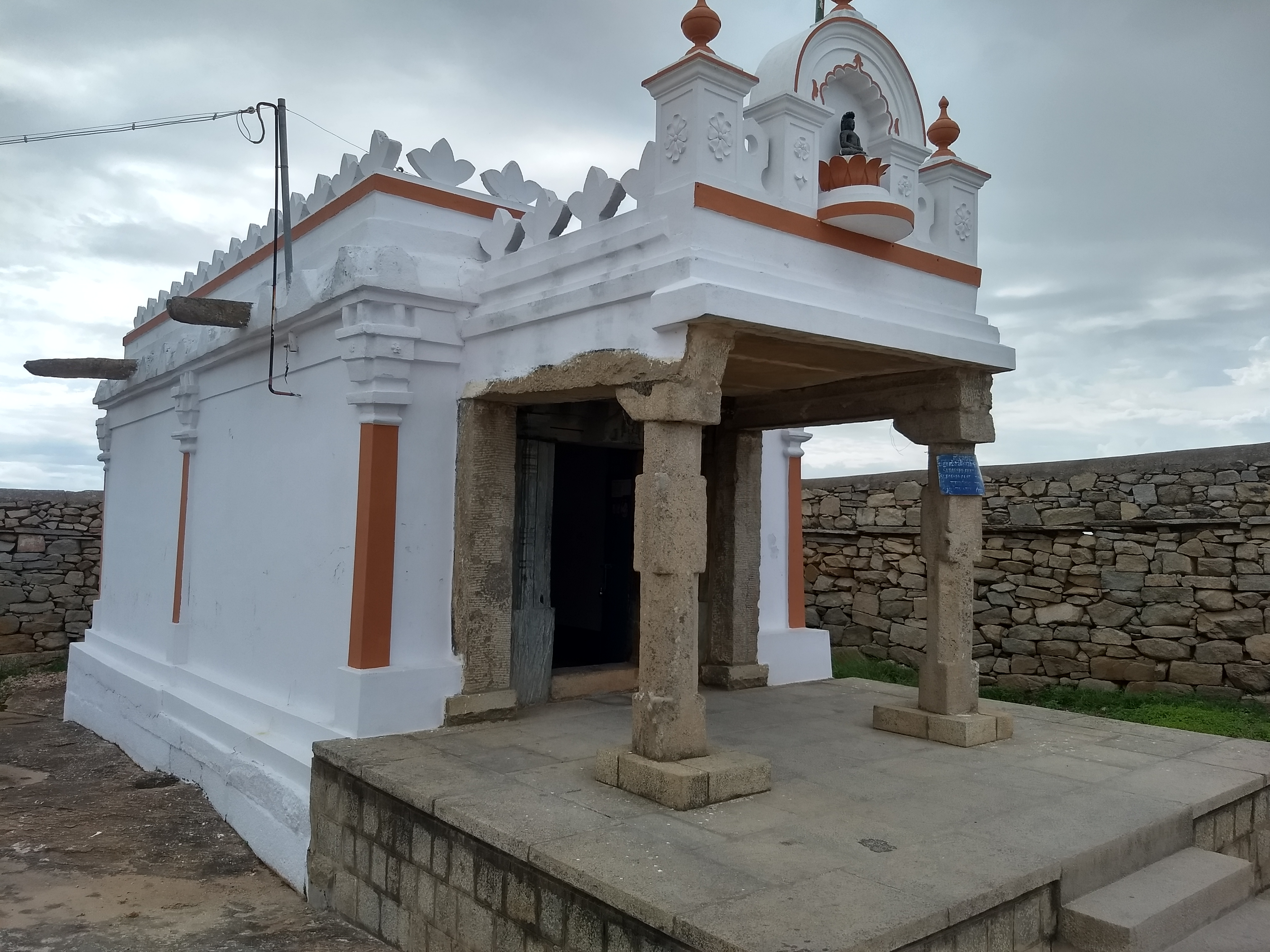
Suparshvanatha Basadi, Shravanabelagola

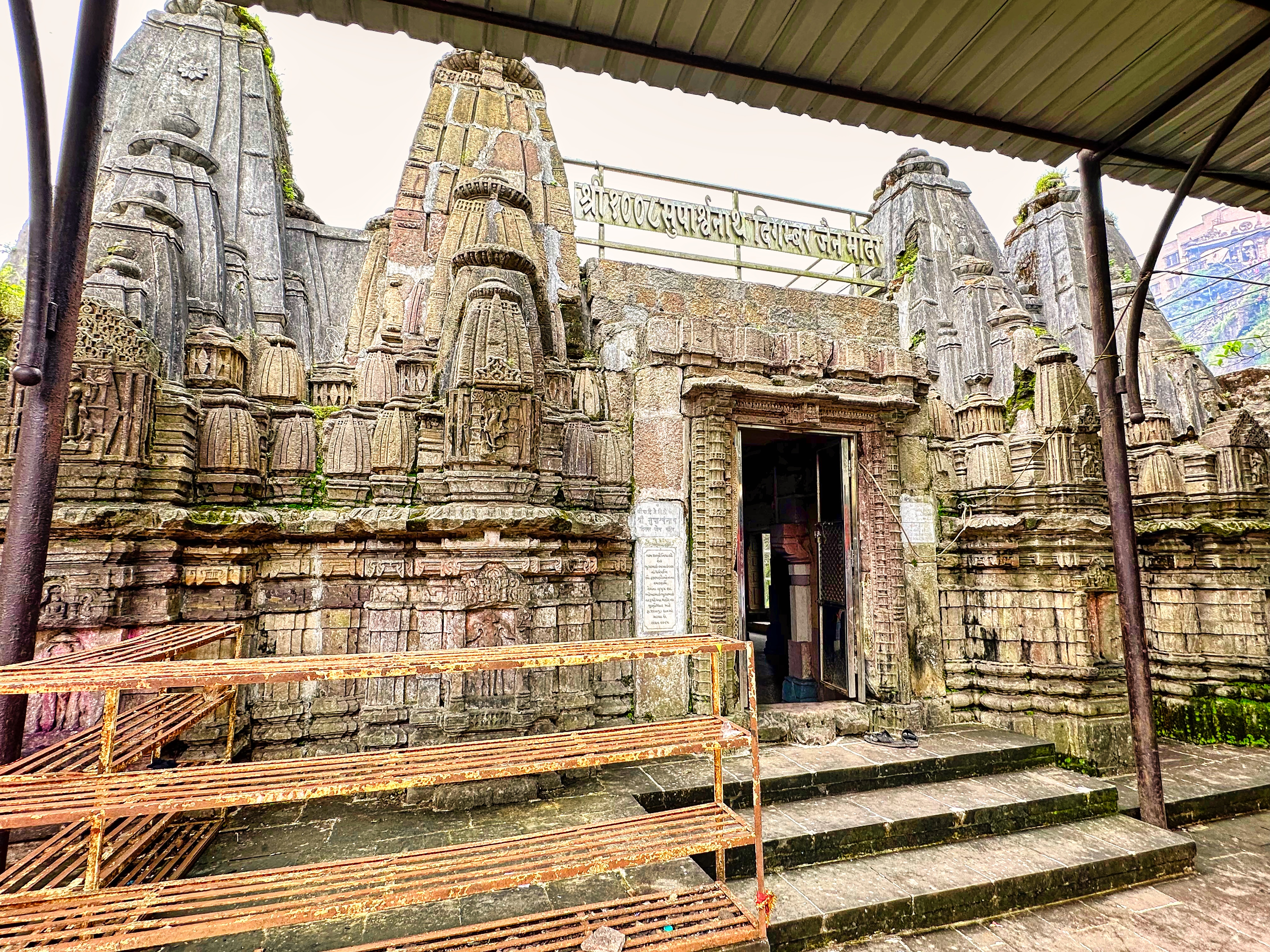
Suparshvanatha temple, Champaner-Pavagadh

== See also ==
- God in Jainism
- Arihant (Jainism)
- Jainism and non-creationism
- Ikshvaku dynasty
