= Shivala Ghat =

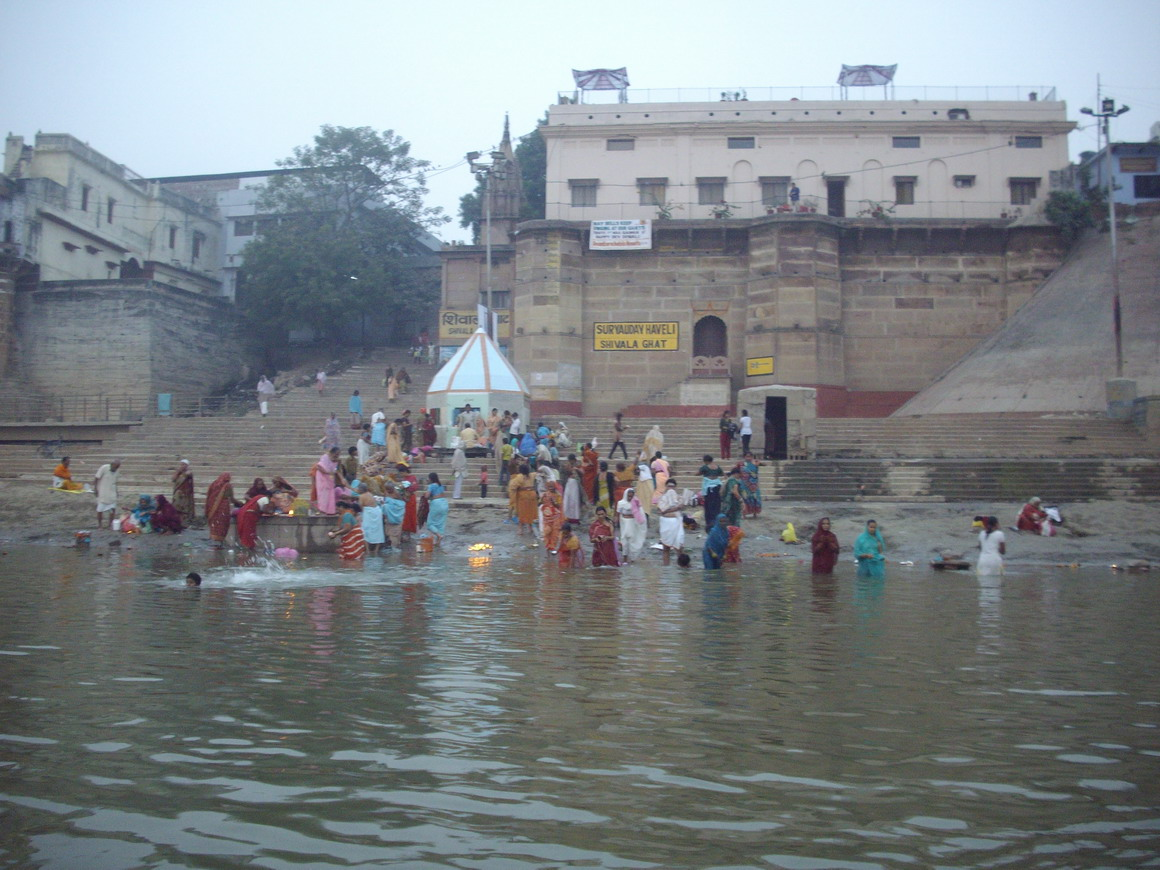
Shivala Ghat

Shivala Ghat is one of the largest ghats in Varanasi, India. It was built by Balwant Singh, a ruler of Benares State, in honour of Hindu god Shiva. A 19th-century palace constructed by Nepalese king Sanjay Vikram Shah lies near the ghat. Shivala ghat is inhabited by south Indian Hindus. The building along the ghat and palaces of Chet Singh (Balwant's successor) were confiscated after the British suppressed the rebellion in which ruler of Varanasi also took part.

== See also ==
- Ghats in Varanasi
