= Scindia Ghat =

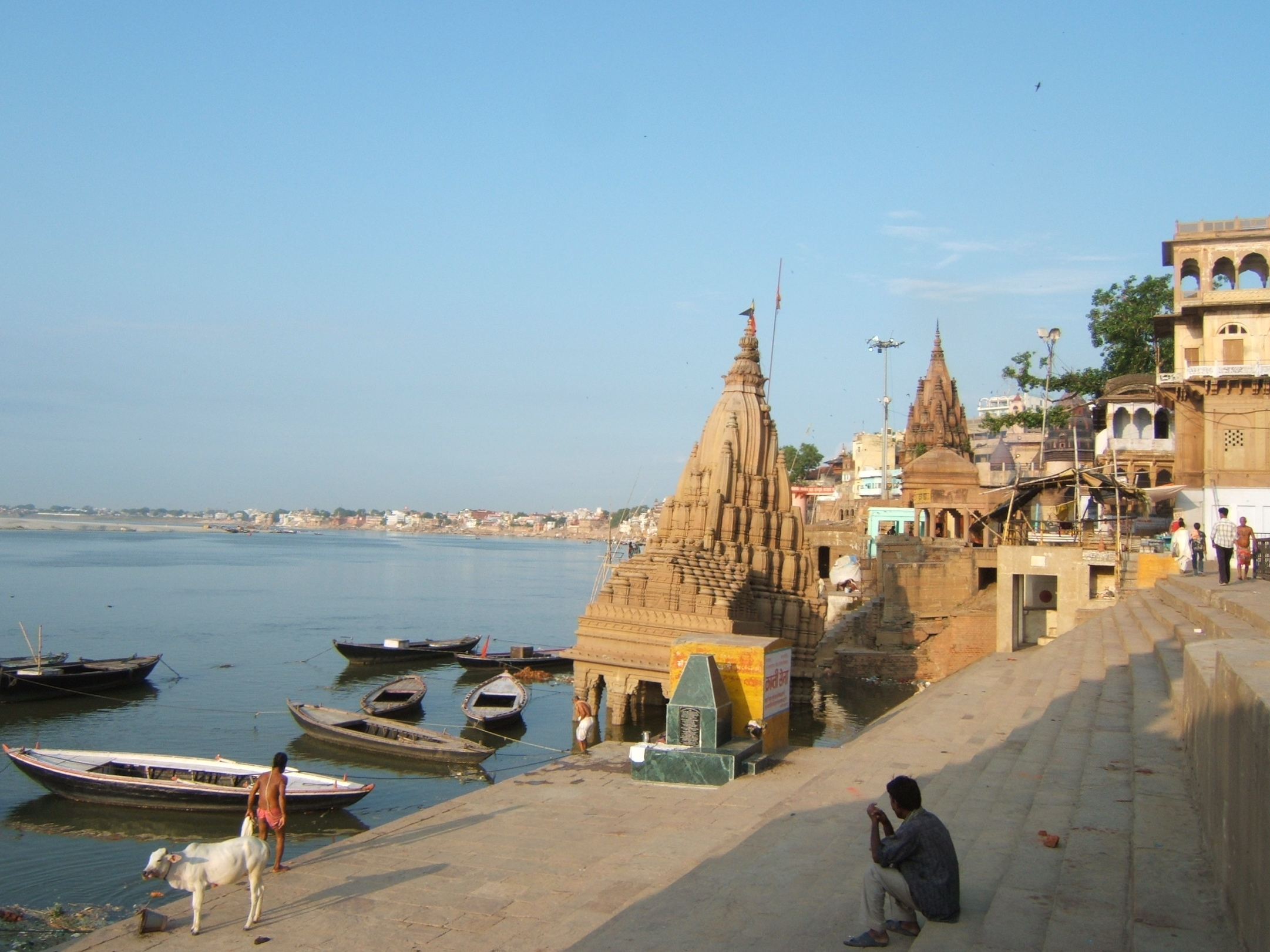
Scindia Ghat at sunrise, July 2007.

Scindia Ghat (Hindi: सिंधिया घाट) is one of the ghats in Varanasi and borders Manikarnika, a place of Hindu cremation, to the north. At this ghat, a tilted Shiva temple can be found lying partially submerged in the Ganges River and it is argued that this ghat collapsed under its own excessive weight. The ghat is named after the Scindias, who built it in 1830. Above the ghat, several of Kashi’s most influential shrines are located within the tight maze of alleys of Siddha Kshetra (Field of Fulfillment). According to mythology, Agni, the Hindu God of Fire, was born here. Hindu devotees propitiate at this place to Vireshwara, the Lord of all heroes, for a son.
