= Munshi Ghat =

Ghat in Varanasi

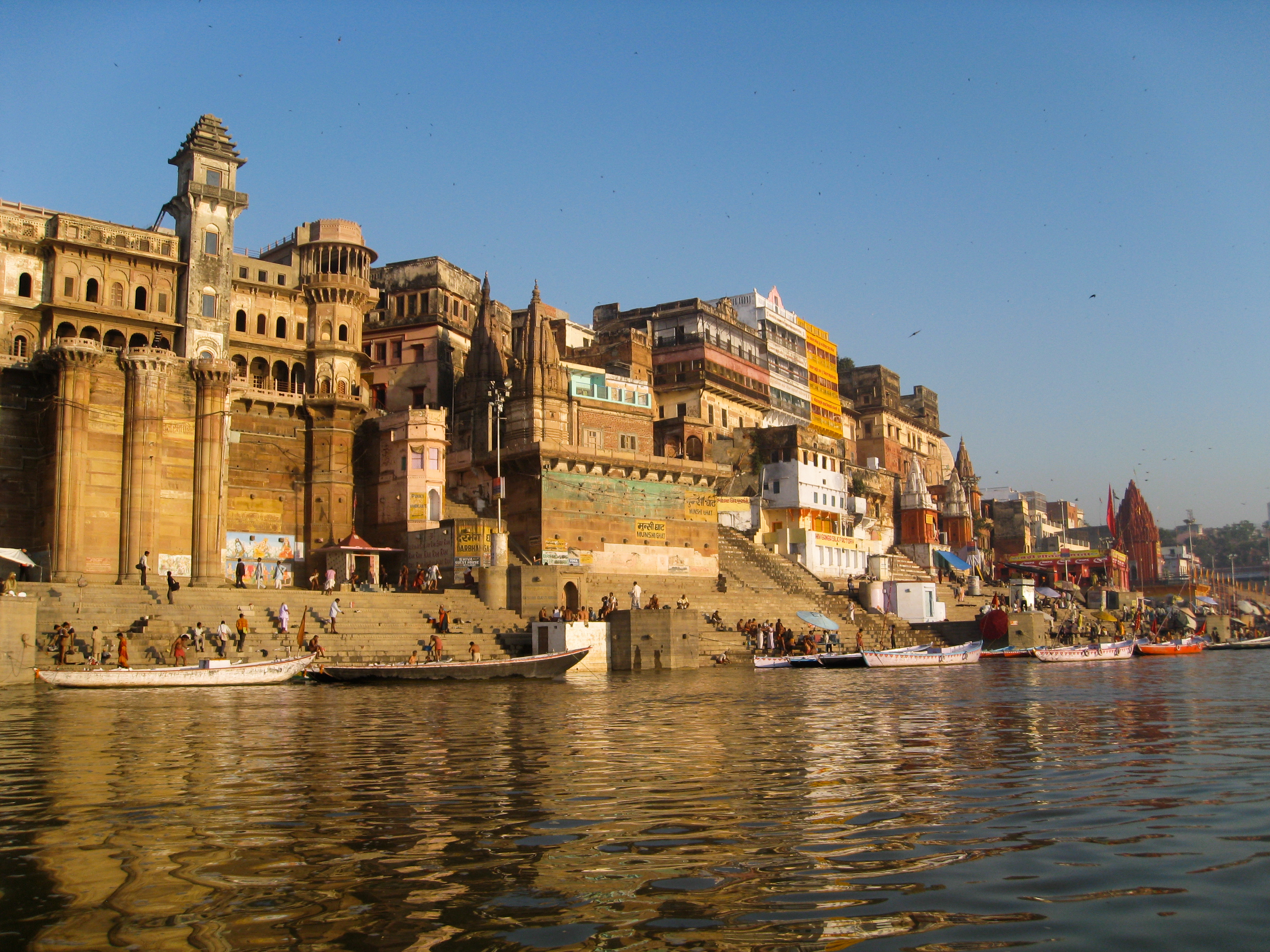

Religion
- Affiliation: Hinduism

Location
- Country: India
- Interactive map of Munshi Ghat
- Coordinates: 25°18′20.475″N 83°0′35.68″E

Munshi Ghat is one of the ghats in Varanasi, Uttar Pradesh, India.

== Significance ==
Built in the year 1812, Munshi Ghat is named after Sridhara Narayana Munshi, who was a finance minister in the estate of Nagpur. In 1915, the Brahmin king Kameshwar Singh Gautam Bahadur of Darbhanga (Bihar) purchased the ghat and extended it. The extension later became known as Darbhanga Ghat.

== Darbhanga Ghat extension ==
The palace of Darbhanga Ghat is made of sandstone from Chunar, with beautiful porches and Greek pillars. This area has been of importance in the Puranic context, but has also gained importance for its grandeur and architectural style.

In 1994 the Darbhanga palace was purchased by the Clarks Hotel Group, who named it the Brijrama Palace, and planned to transform it into a five-star hotel. They have already demolished almost half of the structure from the back; its back perimeter is being extended and its height raised in order to make it suitable for the use of the planned hotel.
