= Ghats in Varanasi =

Riverfront steps leading to the banks of the Ganges river

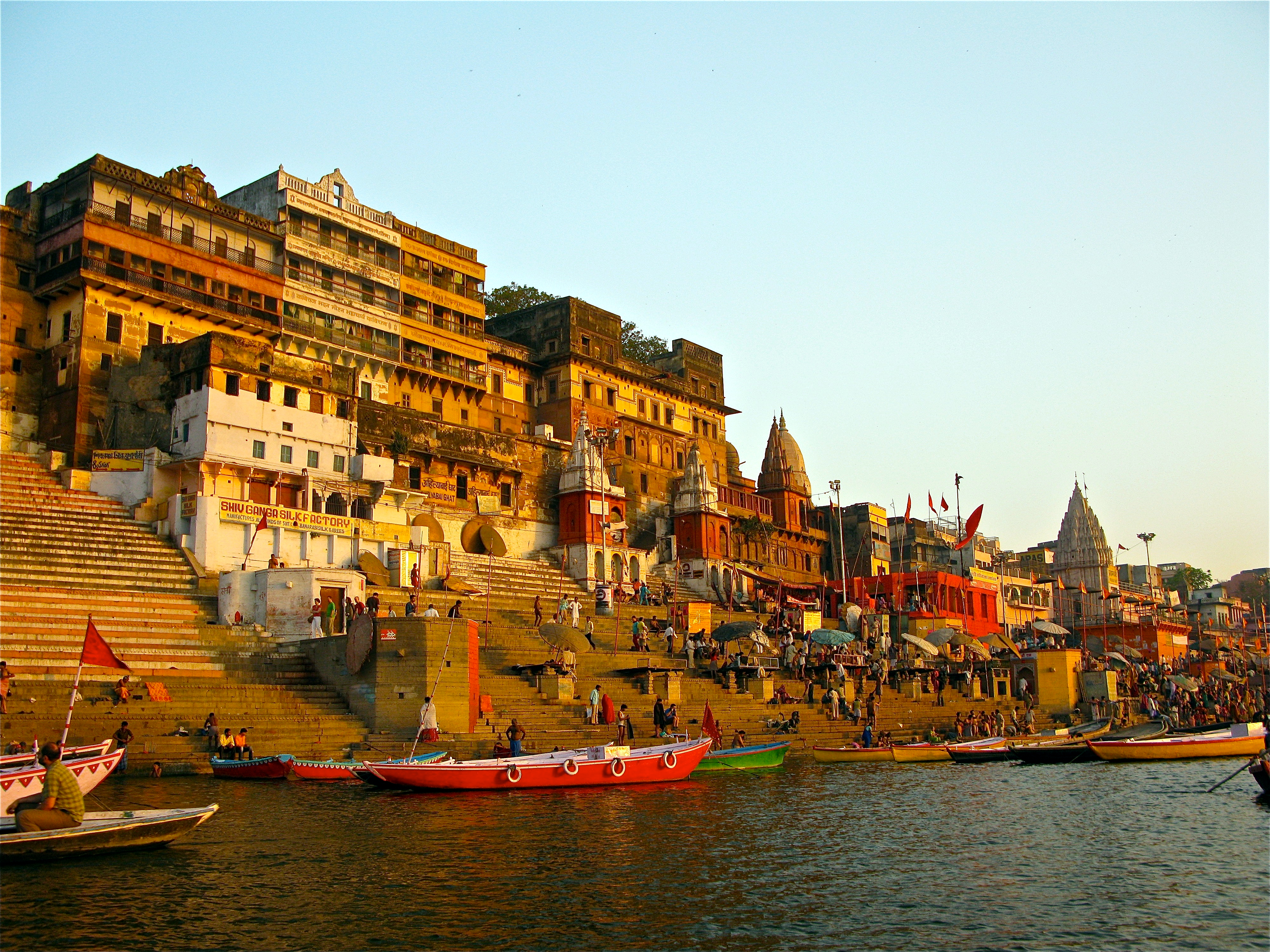
Ahilya Ghat by the Ganges, Varanasi

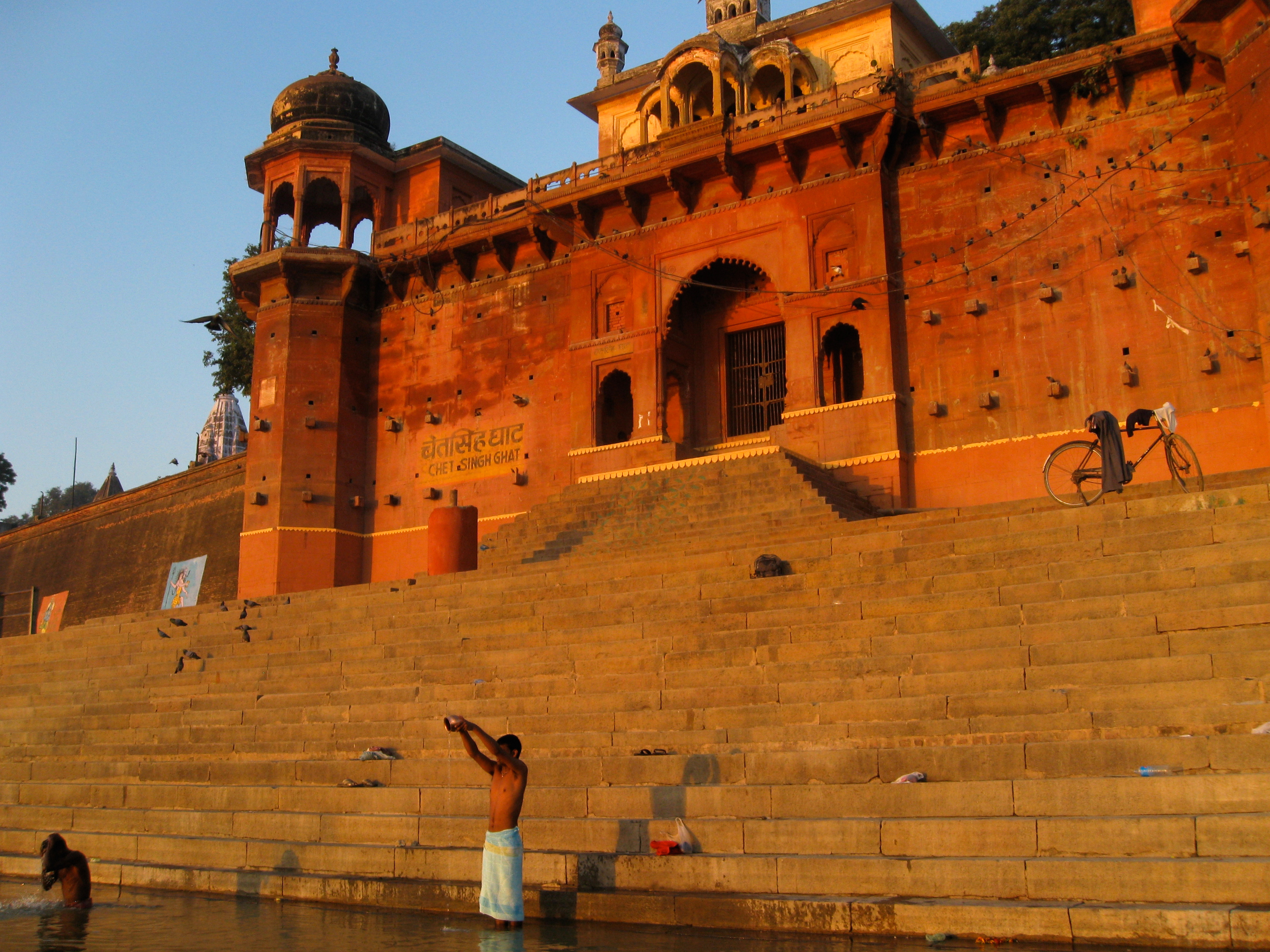
Chet Singh Ghat in Varanasi

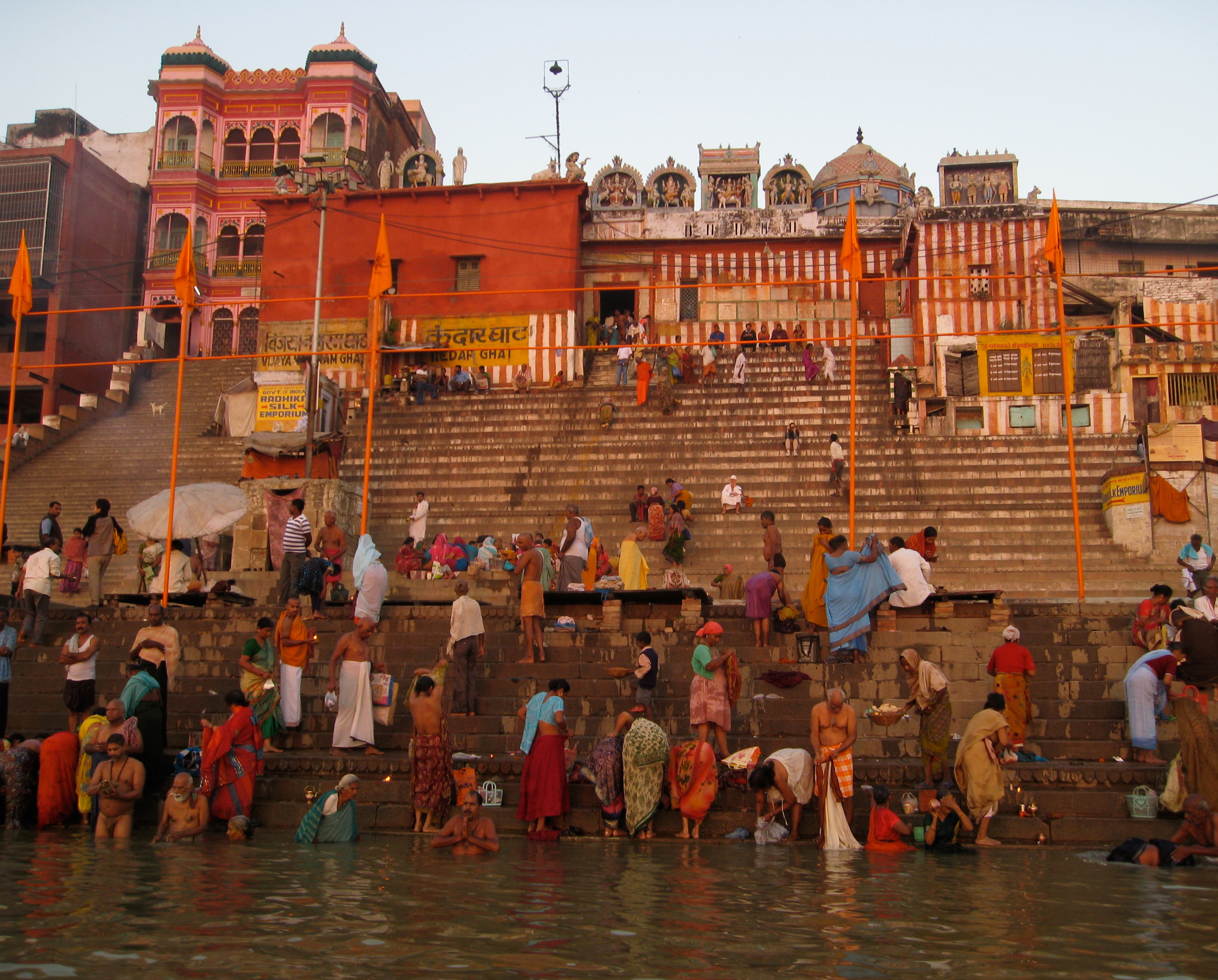
Kedar Ghat in Varanasi

Ghats in Varanasi are riverfront steps leading to the banks of the Ganges river. The city has 84 ghats. Most of the ghats are bathing and puja ceremonial ghats, while two ghats, Manikarnika and Harishchandra, are used exclusively as cremation sites.

Most of the ghats in Varanasi were rebuilt in the 18th century under the Maratha patronage. The patrons of current ghats were Maharajas of Benares, Marathas, Shindes (Scindias), Holkars, Bhonsles and Peshwes (Peshwas). Many ghats are associated with legends or mythologies while other ghats have private histories and users. A morning boat ride on the Ganges along the ghats is a popular visitor attraction.

== Etymology ==
It is derived from Sanskrit, "ghaṭṭa" (Sanskrit: घट्ट). It means an embankment or a landing place.

Ghat, a term used in the Indian subcontinent, depending on the context could either refer to a range of stepped-hills such as Eastern Ghats and Western Ghats; or the series of steps leading down to a body of water or wharf, for bathing or cremation places along the banks of a river or pond, such as the Ghats in Varanasi, Dhoby Ghaut or Aapravasi Ghat. Roads passing through ghats are called Ghat Roads.

== List of ghats ==
The ghats as named and counted by the city of Varanasi with supplementing links, listed in ascending order according to their location (from Assi Ghat to Adi Keshava Ghat):

Part 1: from Assi Ghat to Prayag Ghat (1–41)

| No. | Name | Picture |
|---|---|---|
| 1 | Assi Ghat | |
| 2 | Ganga Mahal Ghat (I) | |
| 3 | Riwan Ghat | |
| 4 | Tulsi Ghat | |
| 5 | Bhadaini Ghat | |
| 6 | Janaki Ghat | |
| 7 | Mata Anandamai | |
| 8 | Vaccharaja Ghat | |
| 9 | Jain Ghat | |
| 10 | Nishadaraja Ghat | |
| 11 | Prabhu Ghat | |
| 12 | Panchkota Ghat | |
| 13 | Chet Singh Ghat | |
| 14 | Niranjani Ghat | |
| 15 | Mahanirvani Ghat | not available |
| 16 | Shivala Ghat | |
| 17 | Gularia Ghat | |
| 18 | Dandi Ghat | |
| 19 | Hanuman Ghat | not available |
| 20 | Prachina (Old) Hanuman Ghat | |
| 21 | Karnataka Ghat | |
| 22 | Harishchandra Ghat | |
| 23 | Lali Ghat | |
| 24 | Vijayanagaram Ghat | |
| 25 | Kedar Ghat | |
| 26 | Caowki (Chauki) Ghat | |
| 27 | Ksemesvara / Somesvara Ghat | |
| 28 | Mansarovar Ghat | |
| 29 | Narada Ghat | |
| 30 | Raja Ghat rebuilt by Amrut Rao Peshwa | |
| 31 | Khori Ghat | not available |
| 32 | Pandey Ghat | |
| 33 | Sarveshvara Ghat | not available |
| 34 | Digpatia Ghat | |
| 35 | Causatthi Ghat | |
| 36 | Rana Mahal Ghat | |
| 37 | Darbhanga Ghat | |
| 38 | Munshi Ghat | |
| 39 | Ahilyabai Ghat | |
| 40 | Sitala Ghat | |
| 41 | Dashashwamedh Ghat | |

Part 2: from Prayag to Adi Keshava Ghat (42–84)

| No. | Name | Picture |
|---|---|---|
| 42 | Prayag Ghat | not available |
| 43 | Rajendra Prasad Ghat | . |
| 44 | Man Mandir Ghat | |
| 45 | Tripura Bhairavi Ghat | |
| 46 | Mira (Meer) Ghat | |
| 47 | Yajneshvara / Naya Ghat | old site of Yajnesvara Ghat |
| 48 | Nepali Ghat | not available |
| 49 | Lalita Ghat | |
| 50 | Bauli/ Umaraogiri/ Amroha Ghat | not available |
| 51 | Jalasen (Jalasayi) Ghat | |
| 52 | Kshiriki Ghat | not available |
| 53 | Manikarnika Ghat | |
| 54 | Bajirao Ghat | not available |
| 55 | Scindia Ghat | |
| 56 | Sankatha Ghat | |
| 57 | Ganga Mahal Ghat (II) | |
| 58 | Bhonsale Ghat | |
| 59 | Naya Ghat | In Prinsep's map of 1822, this was named as Gularia Ghat |
| 60 | Genesa/ Agnishvara Ghat | |
| 61 | Mehta Ghat | Formally this was part of the preceding ghat, but after the construction of V.S.Mehta hospital (1962), this is known to the name of latter one. |
| 62 | Rama Ghat | |
| 63 | Jatara Ghat | |
| 64 | Raja Gwalior Ghat | |
| 65 | Mangala Gauri Ghat (also known as Bala Ghat) | |
| 66 | Venimadhava Ghat | part of the Pancaganga Ghat and also known as Vindu Madhava Ghat |
| 67 | Panchaganga Ghat | |
| 68 | Durga Ghat | |
| 69 | Brahma Ghat | |
| 70 | Bundi Parakota Ghat | |
| 71 | (Adi)Shitala Ghat | This is an extended part of the preceding ghat |
| 72 | Lal Ghat | |
| 73 | Hanumanagardh Ghat | |
| 74 | Gaya/Gai Ghat | |
| 75 | Badri Nayarana Ghat | |
| 76 | Trilochan Ghat | |
| 77 | Gola Ghat | Since the late 12th cent. this site was used as ferry point and was also known for several granaries (gold) |
| 78 | Nandesvara /Nandu Ghat | |
| 79 | Sakka Ghat | |
| 80 | Telia Nala Ghat | |
| 81 | Naya/Phuta Ghat | During the 18th century the ghat – area became deserted (Phuta), but later on it was renovated. This way the ghat was formerly known as phuta, and later as Naya. |
| 82 | Prahalada Ghat | |
| 83 | Raja Ghat (Bhaisasur Rajghat) / Lord Dufferin bridge / Malaviya Bridge | |
| 84 | Adi Keshava Ghat | |
| | Sant Ravidas Ghat | |
| | Nishad Ghat (divided from Prahalada) | |
| | Rani Ghat | |
| | Shri Panch Agni Akhara Ghat | |
| | Tathagat Ghat / Buddha Ghat | |
| 89 | Na Mo Ghat | A recent construction, named after the nickname of the Indian Prime minister Narendra Modi (NaMo). |

== Popular ghats ==
According to the puranic sources, there are five key ghats on the riverfront which are important because of their association with a defining feature of the holy city of Kashi: Assi Ghat, Dashashwamedh Ghat, Manikarnika Ghat, Panchganga Ghat, Rajendra Prasad Ghat, and Adi Keshav Ghat.

=== Assi Ghat ===
This ghat that used to lie at the confluence of the Ganges with the dry river Asi marks the traditional southern boundary of the city. Asisangameshwar Temple at the ghat finds mention in the Kashi Khand of Skandmahapuran. This ghat is very popular because it is one of the very few ghats that is linked with the city through a wide street. It is also the major ghat that is closest to Banaras Hindu University. Assi ghat's name is derived from the river Assi. Two lingas are worshipped at this site. Assi Ghat is described, in some of the Puranas, as the place where the goddess Durga defeated two asuras, Shumba and Nishumba. Assi ghat is also the place where Tulsidas completed the Ramcharitmanas. Prime Minister Narendra Modi launched a water ATM here on 17 September 2015 on the occasion of the PM's birthday.

=== Dashashwamedh Ghat ===
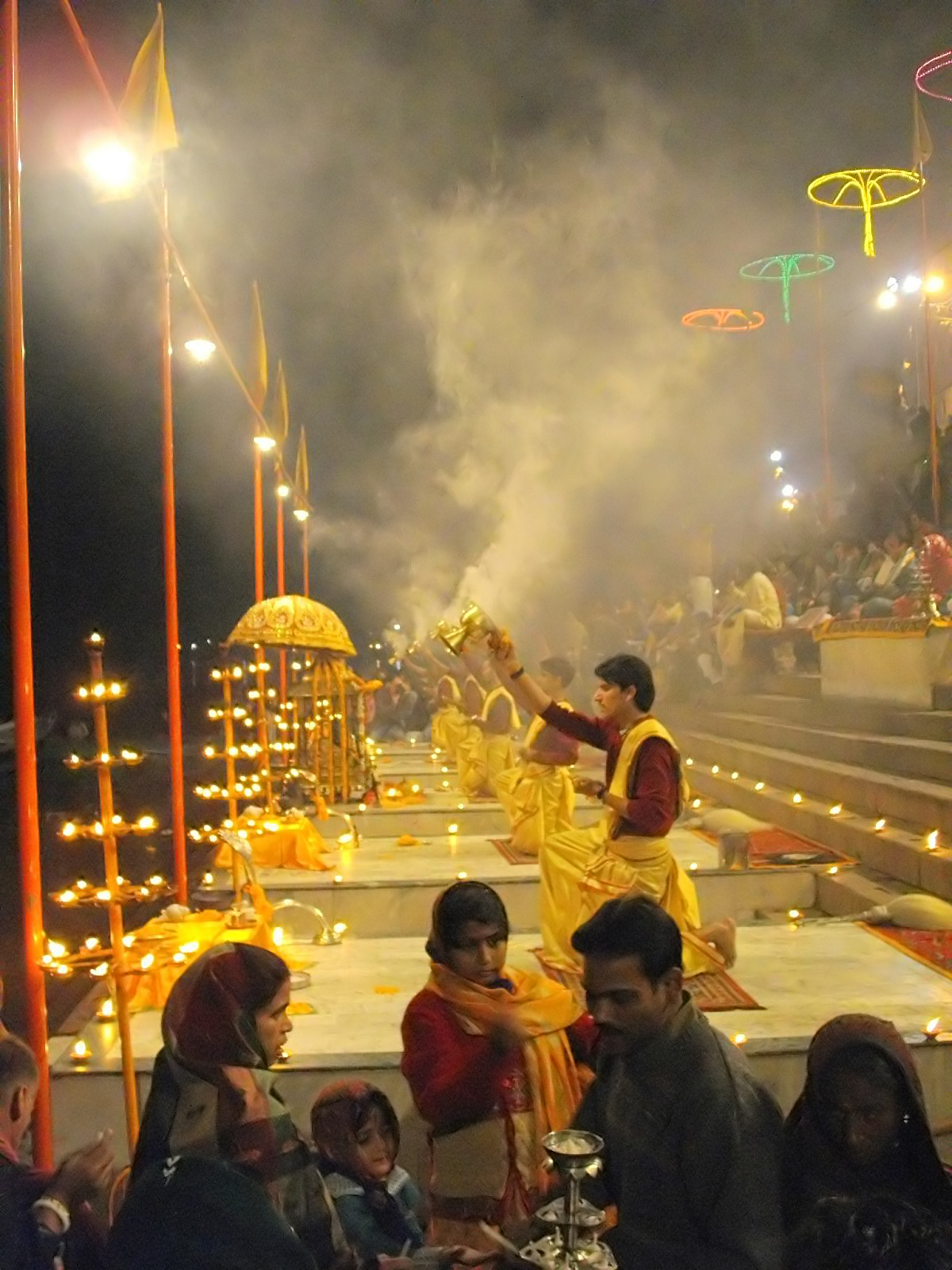
Ganges Aarti at Dashashwamedh Ghat, Varanasi

Dashashwamedh Ghat is located close to the Vishwanath Temple and is the most popular ghat. According to legend, Brahma performed ten Ashwamedha sacrifices here. Every evening an aarti is performed at this ghat in dedication to Shiva, the goddess Ganga, Surya, Agni, as well as the whole universe.

=== Manikarnika Ghat ===
The Manikarnika Ghat is one of the cremation sites. There are two legends which are associated with the Manikarnika Ghat. According to one, Vishnu used his Chakra to dig a pit and filled it with his perspiration while performing various penances. While watching Vishnu, one of Shiva's earrings or manikarnika fell into the pit. According to the second legend, Parvati hid her earrings at this site to keep Shiva from traveling around the world. She told him that she had lost the earrings on the banks of the Ganges. In this legend, whenever a body gets cremated at the Manikarnika Ghat, Shiva asks the soul whether it has seen the earrings.

=== Raj Ghat ===
Located near the Kashi railway station, it is one of the renowned ghats of Varanasi. It is situated adjacent to the Raj Ghat bridge. Famous Ravidas temple is located on this ghat. It is also famous for Pind Daan and asthi-visarjan ceremonies. Famous priests of Kashi are based here. The ghat can be easily accessed by various modes of transportation, with parking facilities available. This ghat is also friendly for disabled people who can not walk through narrow lanes of Kashi. They can easily reach here by car or bike.

=== Scindia Ghat ===
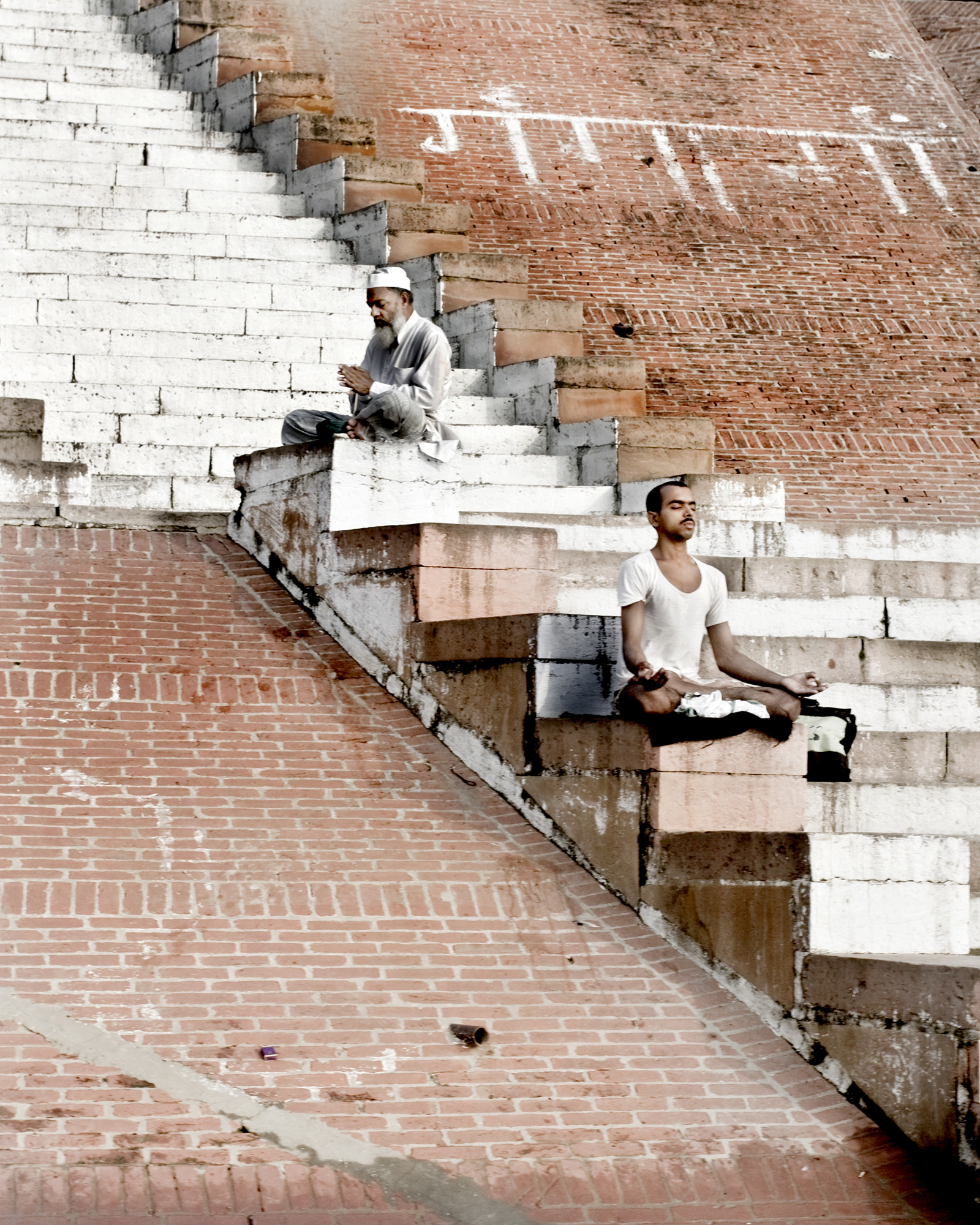
Early morning meditation on a Ghat on the Ganges, Varanasi

Scindia Ghat has been built by Maharani Baizabai Scindia of Gwalior. It borders Manikarnika to the north, with its Shiva temple lying partially submerged in the river as a result of excessive weight of the ghat's construction about 150 years ago. Above the ghat, several of Kashi's most influential shrines are located within the tight maze of alleys of Siddha Kshetra (Field of Fulfillment). According to tradition, Agni, the Hindu God of Fire was born here. Hindu devotees propitiate at this place Vireshwara, the Lord of all heroes, for a son.

=== Maan-Mandir Ghat ===
Mana-Mandir Ghat: Maharaja Jai Singh II of Jaipur built this Ghat in 1770, as well as the Jantar Mantar equipped with ornate window casings along with those at Delhi, Jaipur, Ujjain, and Mathura. There is a fine stone balcony in the northern part of the ghat. Devotees pay homage here to the lingam of Someswar, the Lord of the Moon.

=== Lalita Ghat ===
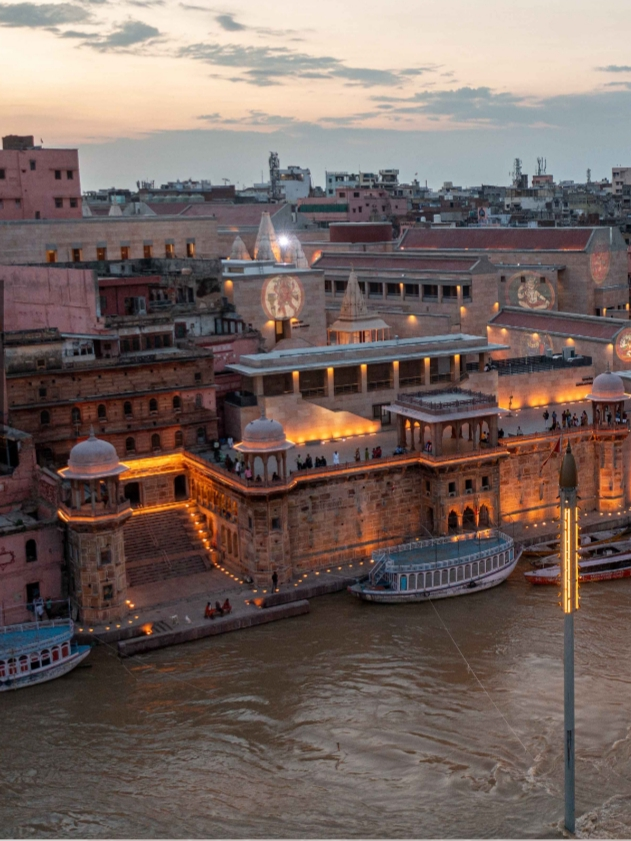
Lalita Ghat

Lalita Ghat: The late King of Nepal built this Ghat in the northern region of Varanasi. It is the site of the Ganges Keshav Temple, a wooden temple built in typical Kathmandu style, The temple has an image of Pashupateshwar, a manifestation of Lord Shiva. Local festivals including musical parties and games regularly take place at the beautiful Assi Ghat which is at the end of the continuous line of ghats. It is a favourite site of painters and photographers. It is here at the Assi Ghat that Swami Pranabananda, the founder of Bharat Sevasharam Sangh, attained 'Siddhi' (fulfilment/success) in his 'Tapasya' (endeavour) for Lord Shiva, under the auspices of Guru Gambhirananda of Gorakhpur.

=== Jain Ghat or the Bachraj Ghat ===
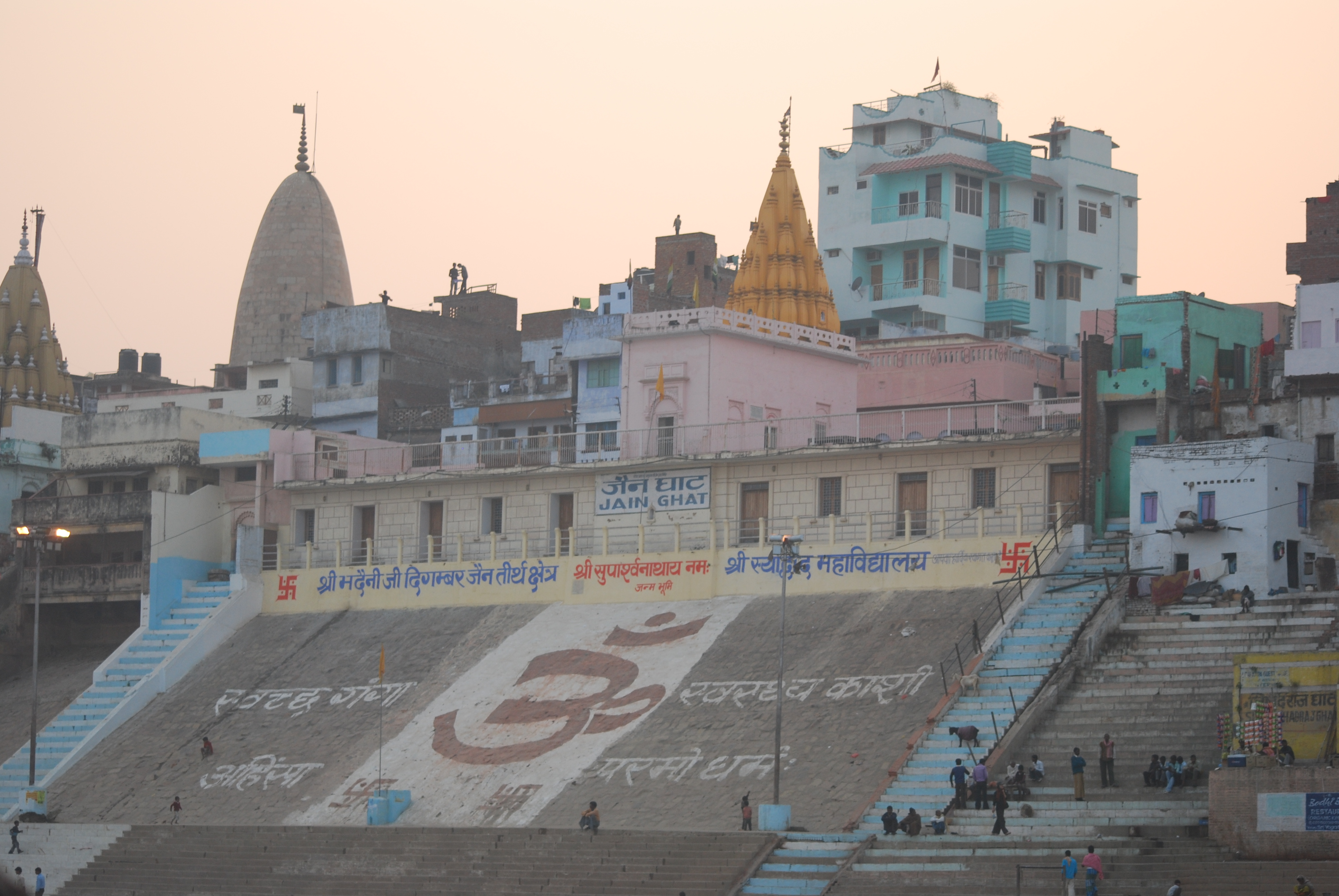
Bachraj Ghat

The Jain Ghat or Bachraj Ghat is a Jain Ghat and has three Jain temples located on the banks of the river. It is believed that the Jain Maharajas used to own these ghats. Bachraj Ghat has three Jain temples near the river's banks and one they are a very ancient temple of Tirthankara Suparswanath.

=== Tathagat Ghat or Buddha Ghat ===
Tathagat Ghat is a famous Ghat of Varanasi which is situated in Sarai Mohana. Sarai Mohana is situated near Sarnath. Sarnath is that place where Tathagata Buddha gave his First Sermon to their five disciples. This ghat was named after Gautam Buddha. The word "Tathagata" is synonyms of Gautam Buddha. So it is also called Buddha Ghat. It is believed that the Buddhists used this ghats. There is one Tathagata Buddha (Bhagavan) statue situated in the Ghat campus.

=== Other ===
- The Maan-Sarowar Ghat was built by Man Singh of Amber.
- the Darbhanga Ghat was built by the Maharaja of Darbhanga
- Tulsidas wrote Rāmacaritamānasa at Tulsi Ghat.
- The Chet Singh Ghat, with a magnificent fort-like palace, is named after Chait Singh. The original name of the ghat is Shivala Ghat. However, it is called Chet Singh Ghat to honour his memory of the revolt .
- The headquarters of the Sri Kashi Math Samsthan, a spiritual school followed by the Konkani speaking Goud Saraswat Brahmins, is located in Brahma Ghat.

== Cremation on ghats ==
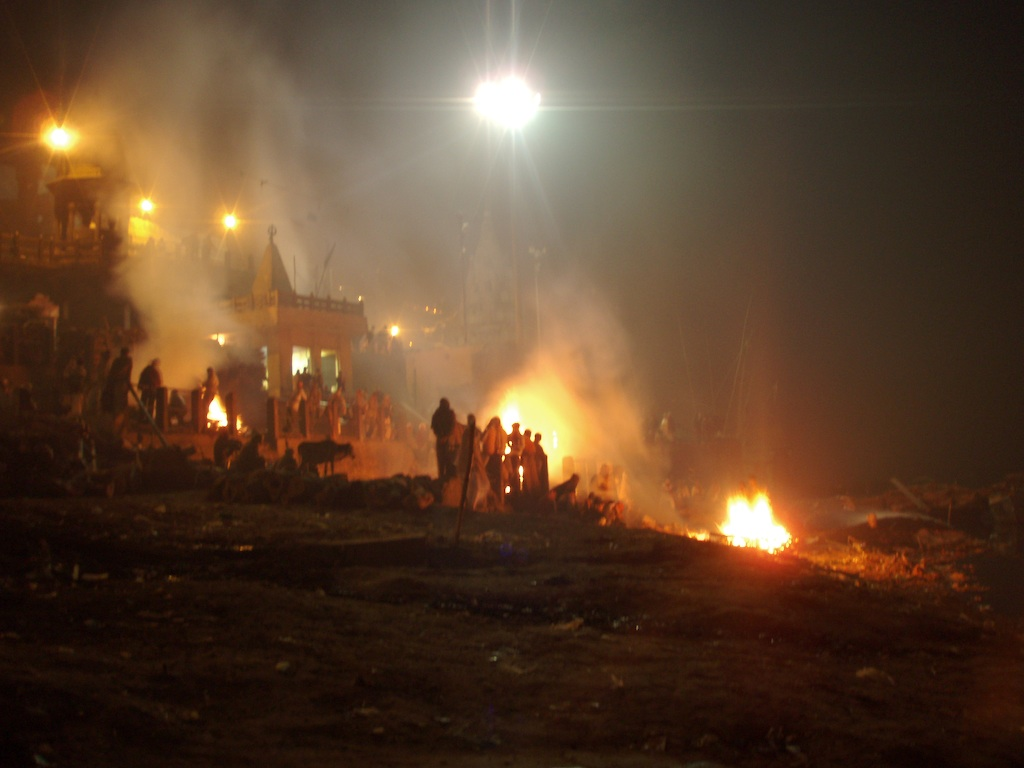
Cremations in progress at Manikarnika Ghat, Varanasi.

In the Hindu tradition, cremation is one of the rites of passage, and the Ghats of Varanasi are considered one of the auspicious locations for this ritual. At the time of the cremation or "last rites", a puja (prayer) is performed by one or more Hindu priests. Sacred hymns and mantras are recited during cremation to mark the ritual. The Manikarnika and Harishchandra Ghats are dedicated to the cremation ritual. Annually, less than 2 in 1000 people who die in India, or 25,000 to 30,000 bodies are cremated on various Varanasi Ghats; about an average of 80 per day.

== Pollution of ghats ==
The practice of cremation in Varanasi has become controversial for the environmental pollution it causes to the River Ganges. In the 1980s, the Government of India funded a Clean Ganges initiative in order to address cremation and other sources of water pollution along the Ghats of Varanasi. In many cases, the cremation is done elsewhere and only the ashes are dispersed into the river near these Ghats. Furthermore, untreated sewage is a pervasive source of river pollution in India. City municipal waste and untreated sewage is the largest source of pollution of the River Ganges nearby the Ghats of Varanasi.

== See also ==
- Ghats in Bhagalpur
