= Ghat =

Steps leading to a body of water

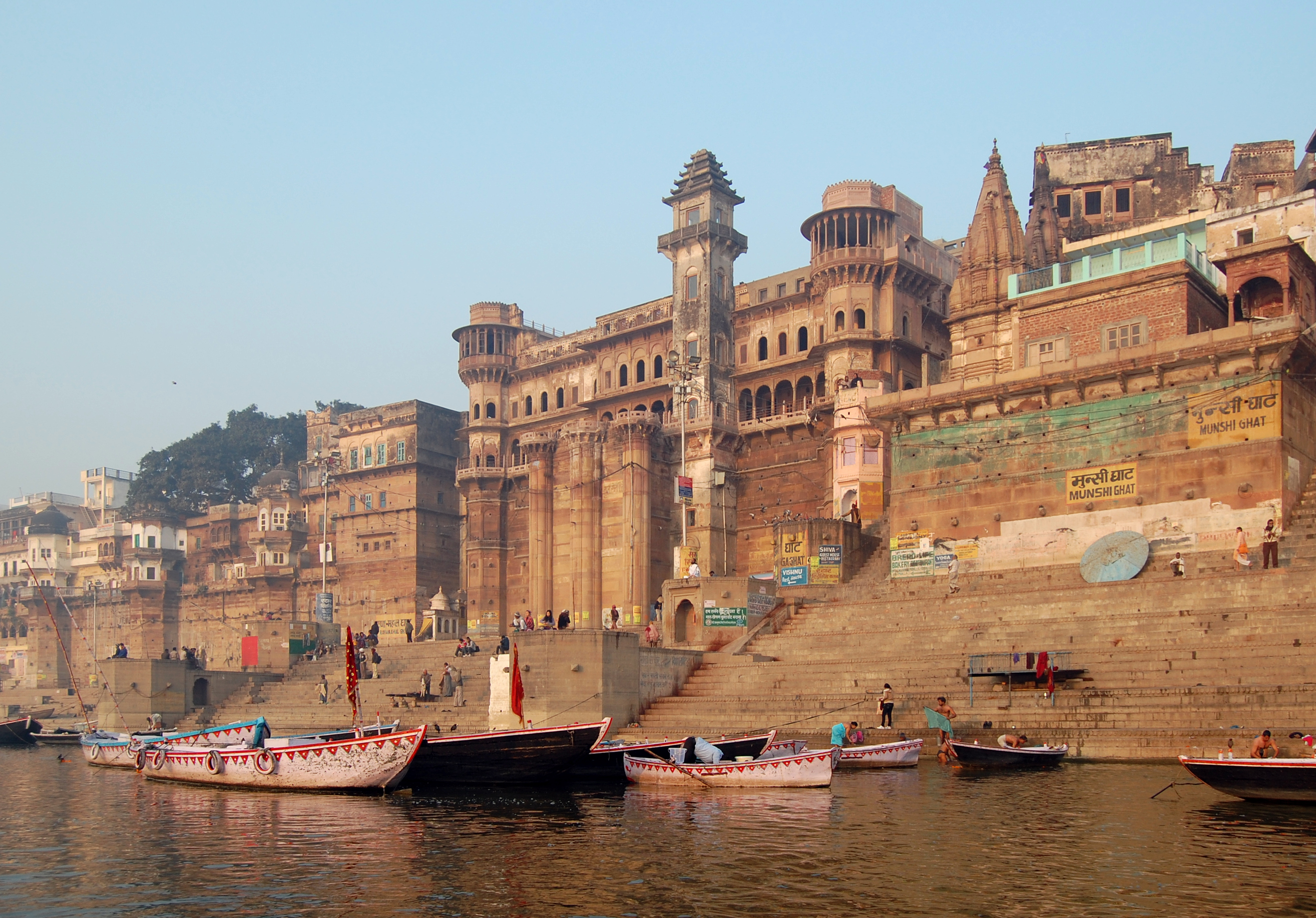
Munshi Ghat

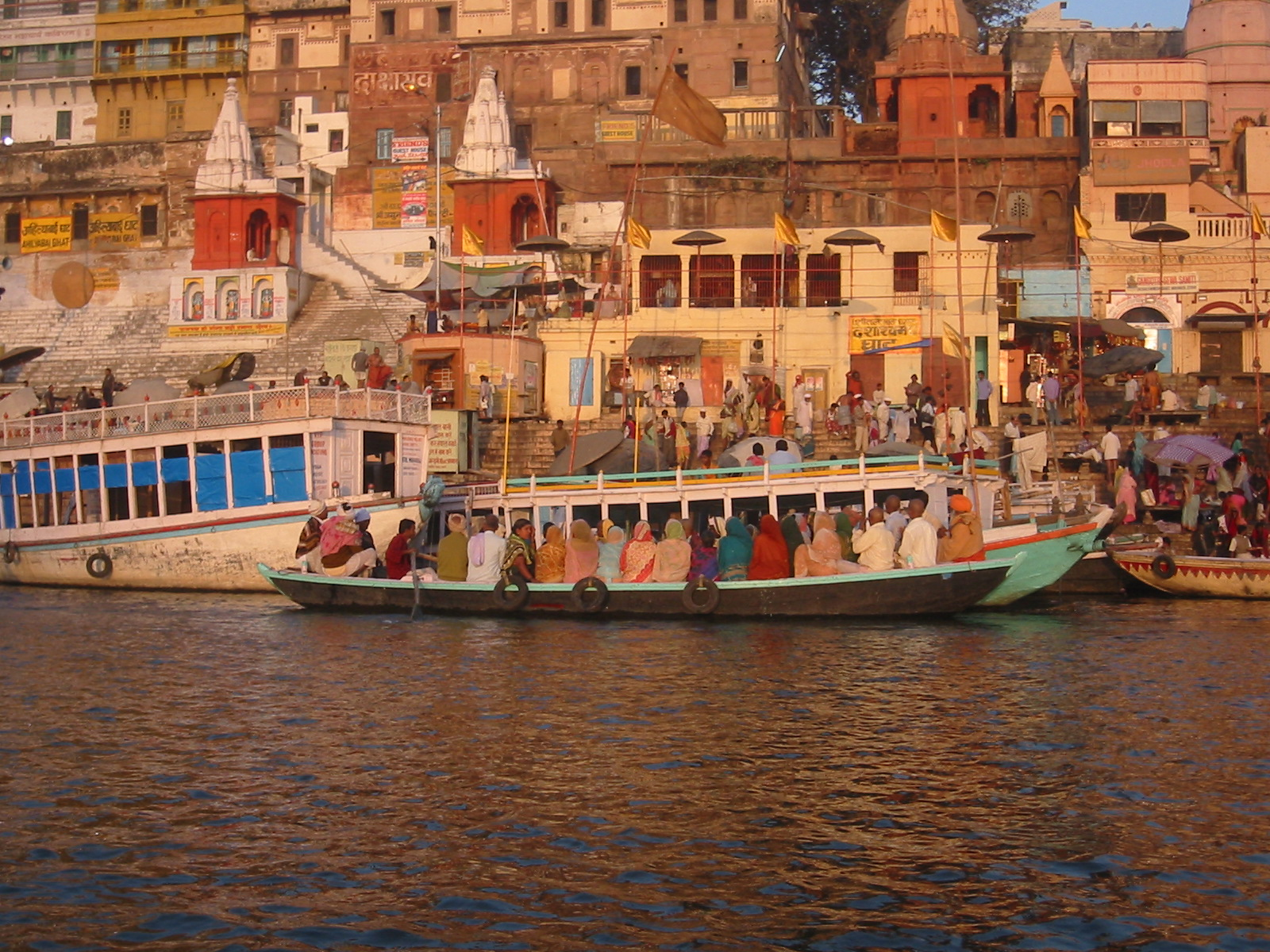
Dashashwamedh Ghat on the Ganges river, in Varanasi.

Ghat (Hindi: [ɡʱaːʈ]), a term used in the Indian subcontinent, to refer to the series of steps leading down to a body of water or wharf, such as a bathing or cremation place along the banks of a river or pond, the Ghats in Varanasi, Dhobi Ghat or the Aapravasi Ghat.

== Etymology ==
The origin of the Hindi 'ghat' is Sanskrit: घट्ट, ghaṭṭa and is normally translated as ghaṭ, quay, landing or bathing place, as well as steps by a river-side. The word 'ghat' has also been derived from Dravidian etymons such as Telugu kaṭṭa and gaṭṭu (dam and embankment) derived from kaṭṭu meaning "to tie".

== Types ==
=== River ghats ===
These are bathing wharves on a river. The numerous significant ghats along the Ganges are the Varanasi ghats (the city of Varanasi has 88 ghats) and generically the "ghats of the Ganges". Most of these were constructed under the patronage of various Maratha rulers such as Ahilyabai Holkar (Queen of the Malwa Kingdom from 1767 to 1795) in the 18th century.

In Madhya Pradesh in central India, there are further significant ghats along the Narmada River. People who live on the steps are also called ghats.

The Bhagalpur Ghats are another example.

=== Shmashana, the cremation ghats ===
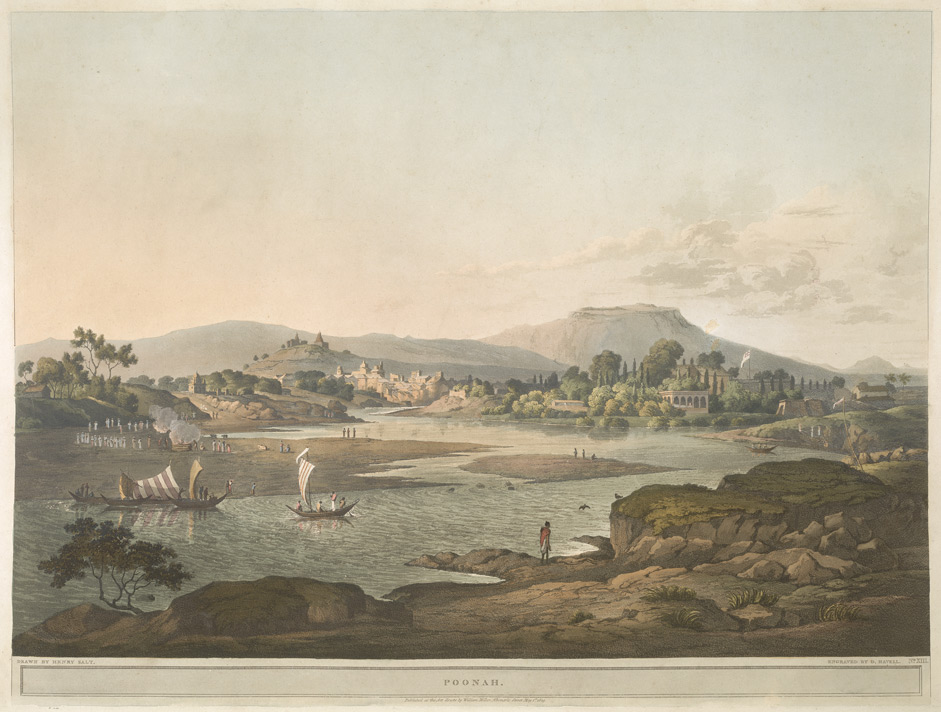
A late 18th-century painting of Pune with the Shmashana ghat at the confluence of Mula and Mutha rivers in the foreground

Ghats such as these are useful for both mundane purposes (such as cleaning) and religious rites (i.e. ritual bathing or ablutions); there are also specific "shmashana" or "cremation" ghats where bodies are cremated waterside, allowing ashes to be washed away by rivers. Notable examples include Nigambodh Ghat and Raj Ghat in Delhi, situated on the Yamuna River. Raj Ghat, in particular, was the cremation site for Mohandas Karamchand Gandhi and numerous political leaders after him, and the Manikarnika Ghat at Varanasi on the Ganges.

=== As place name suffix ===
"Ghat" and "Ghata" is also a suffix used in several place names across the subcontinent. This is an incomplete list:

- Balaghat, Madhya Pradesh, India
- Balurghat, West Bengal, India
- Batiaghata, Khulna, Bangladesh
- Charghat, Rajshahi, Bangladesh
- Chunarughat, Habiganj, Bangladesh
- Devghat, Nepal
- Gaighat, Nepal
- Ghatail, Tangail, Bangladesh
- Ghoraghat, Dinajpur, Bangladesh
- Goalandaghat, Rajbari, Bangladesh
- Golaghat, Assam, India
- Gowainghat, Sylhet, Bangladesh
- Haluaghat, Mymensingh, Bangladesh
- Kanaighat, Sylhet, Bangladesh
- Pasighat, Arunachal Pradesh, India
- Patharghata, Barguna, Bangladesh
- Saghata, Gaibandha, Bangladesh

== Functions and Uses ==
Ghats in South Asia are a hybrid of hydraulic, civic, economic and religious functions, turning natural shorelines into accessible public and sacred spaces.

The main function of a masonry Ghats is to protect the river banks and lake embankments from erosion and monsoon flooding thus protecting the towns and cities on either side. Given the very significant variation in water levels across the Indian subcontinent between the monsoon and the dry season, the Ghats are built with long flights of steps, broken up by flat landings. These landings provide continuous, safe access to the water's edge and to the moorings as the water level varies through the year.

In everyday life the Ghats are the central public space. Residents use the steps for various purposes such as drawing water, bathing, washing clothes etc. Gently sloping ramps provide easy access for livestock to the shallow water for drinking and washing.

In South Asian religious traditions a ghat is a tīrtha (a place of crossing, a threshold) between the world of the mundane and the divine. Snāna (bathing) is a very common practice as a form of ritual purification. People do their daily rituals from the steps of the ghat, including sūrya-namaskāra (sun salutations), the three immersions with mantras and the ceremonial sipping of water. Religious architecture is very often built right into the steps and platforms.

Ghats are the scene of major regional and national religious gatherings. The large mela such as the Kumbha Mela, the Ardha Kumbha Mela and the Magh Mela all see millions of pilgrims bathing in the sacred riverbanks. During the night festivals such as Diwali, Karttik Purnima and Durga Puja the Ghats are lined with thousands of oil lamps. On ordinary evenings there is an arti and people set little leaf boats with lamps and flowers afloat. The Ghats are also the final destination for the processions of the festivals, where the clay images of the deities are immersed (visarjana) and dissolved back into the water.

Water is linked in the Hinduism with both creation and dissolution and so the Ghats are central to end of life and ancestral rites. The designated cremation Ghats have raised stone platforms on which the bodies are cremated and the ashes are then scattered into the river to assist with moksha. The Ghats are also the place where the sraddha, an offering made to the ancestor, is performed.

== Outside Indian subcontinent ==
The word is also used in some places outside the Indian subcontinent. For example, in George Town, Penang, Malaysia, the label "Ghaut" is used to identify the extensions of those streets which formerly ended in ghats before the reclamation of the quayside (e.g., Church St Ghaut, in Malay Gat Lebuh Gereja, is the name of the extension of Church St beyond where the street used to descend to the water via a ghat). Both in Penang and Singapore, there are areas named Dhoby Ghaut (dhobi meaning "launderer" or "laundry", depending on whether it refers to a person or a business).

Aapravasi Ghat or The Immigration Depot is a building complex located in Port Louis on the Indian Ocean island of Mauritius, the first British colony to receive indentured, or contracted, labour workforce from India. From 1849 to 1923, half a million Indian indentured labourers passed through the Immigration Depot, to be transported to plantations throughout the British Empire. The large-scale migration of the laborers left an indelible mark on the societies of many former British colonies, with Indians constituting a substantial proportion of their national populations. In Mauritius alone, 68 percent of the current total population is of Indian ancestry. The Immigration Depot has thus become an important reference point in the history and cultural identity of Mauritius.

== See also ==
- Ghats in Varanasi
- Ghat Roads
- Surinaam Ghat
- Temple tank
- Stepwell
