= Dashashwamedh Ghat =

Ghat in Varanasi, India

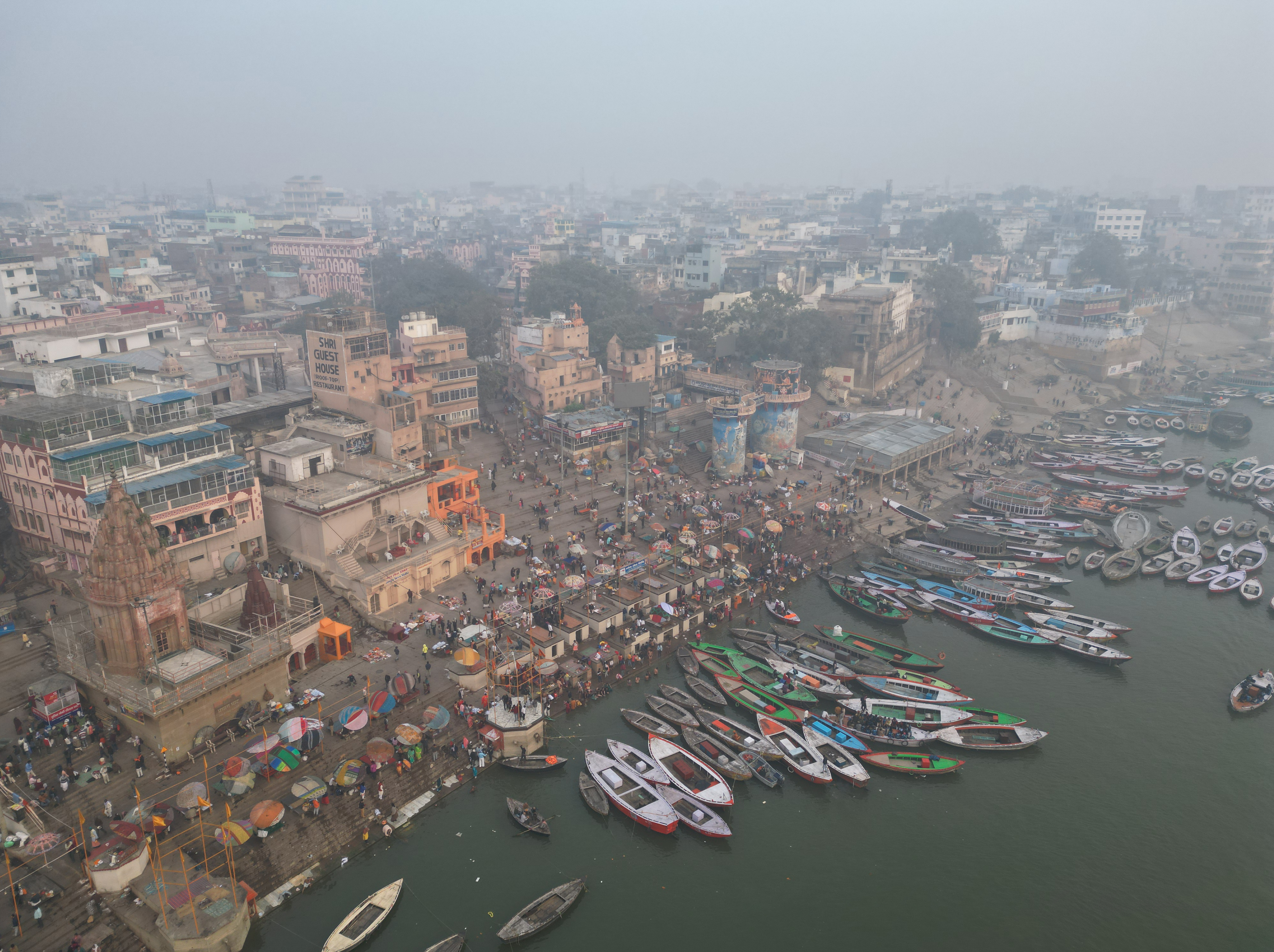

- Location within Varanasi district Location within Uttar Pradesh Location within India

Religion
- Affiliation: Hinduism
- District: Varanasi

Location
- State: Uttar Pradesh
- Country: India
- Coordinates: 25°18′25.808″N 83°0′37.211″E

Dashashwamedh Ghat is a main ghat in Varanasi located on the Ganges River in Uttar Pradesh, India. It is located close to Vishwanath Temple.

There are two Hindu legends associated with the ghat: according to one, Brahma performed ten Ashwamedha yajna here, and in another, ten Ashwamedha sacrifices were done by Bhāra Shiva Nāgas.

Initially construction started by the Raja Dushasan Shah, ''Raja of Dhaudharh'' (Bihar) in 1569 and present ghat was built by Peshwa Balaji Baji Rao near 1735. Later towards the end of 18th century, Ahilyabahi Holkar did some construction on the ghat.

== History ==
According to Puranic texts, there are two legends. One is that it is here that Brahma performed the 'dash' (ten) 'ashwamedha' (horse sacrifice) on behalf of king Divodasa. While according to historian Jayaswal, the name is derived from the 'ten ashwamedha' sacrifices done in the second century by the revivalist Hindu dynasty, the Bhāra Shiva Nāgas..

The ghat was constructed soon after 1735 by Bajirao Peshwa. Later during the end of 18th century, Ahilyabai Holkar constructed a haveli by the name of Ahilyabai Wada and Bharmapuri near Dashashwamedh Ghat.

== Religious significance ==
Dashashwamedh Ghat is one of the major places of religious significance on the banks of the Ganges. It attracts pilgrims, who bathe here at dawn, especially during the month of Magha and the bright half of Jyeshtha. For Panchatrithi pilgrims, this ghat serves as their second dip in the Ganges. There are three Puranic lingas at this ghat that the Panchatrithi pilgrims visit - Shūlatankeshvara (Shiva of the Spear and Hatchet), Bharmeshvara, established by Bharma, and Dāshashwamedheshvara.

Bengalis immerse the images of Durga here during Dusshera and those of Kali during Diwali.

=== Ganga aarti ===
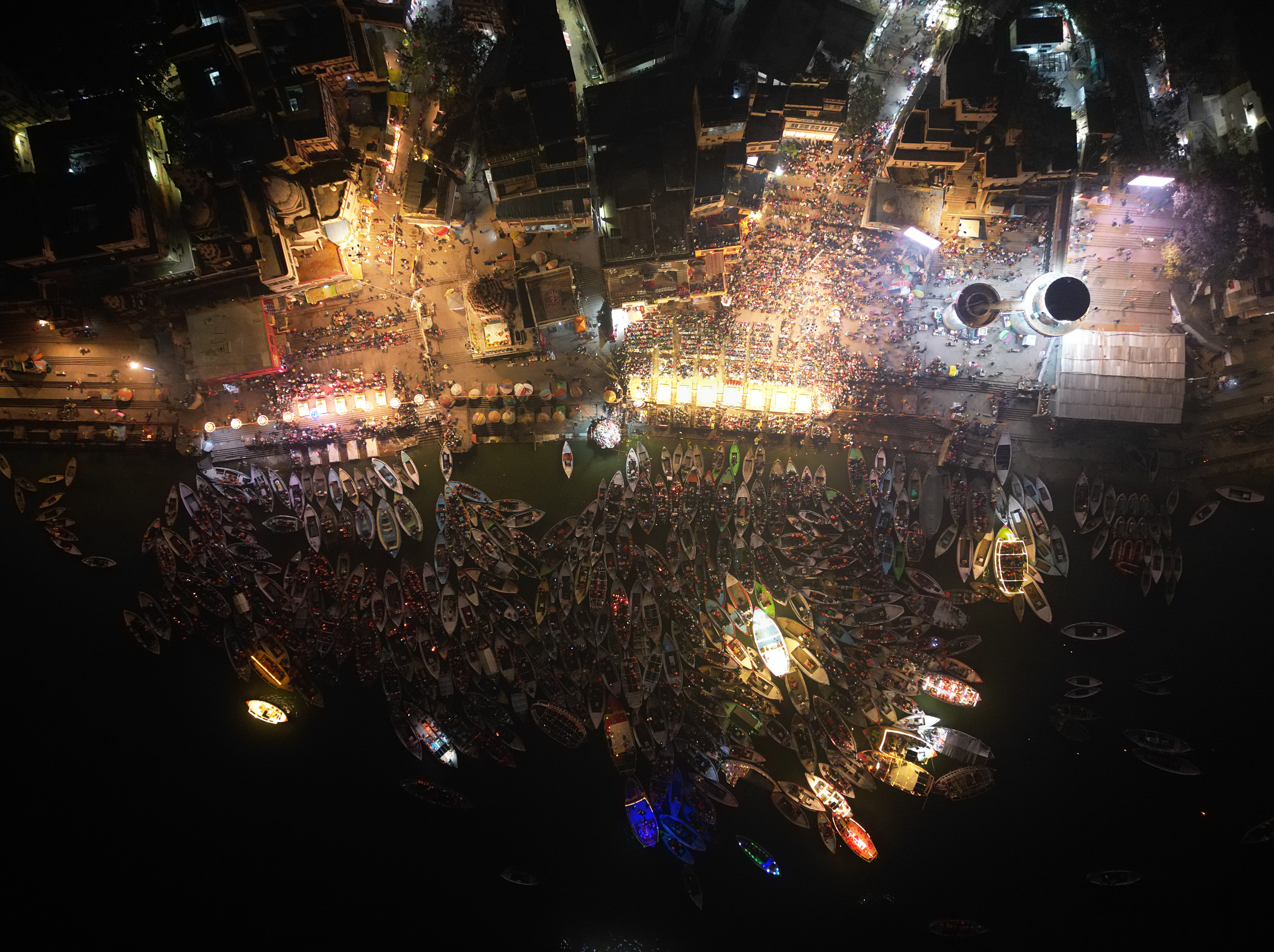
Drone shot of Ganga Aarti at Dashashwamedh Ghat.

The Ganga Aarti (ritual of offering prayer to the Ganges river) is held daily at dusk. Several priests perform this ritual by carrying deepam and moving it up and down in a rhythmic tune of bhajans. Special aartis are held on Tuesdays and on religious festivals.

The Ganga Aarti starts soon after sunset and lasts for about 45 minutes. In the summer, the Aarti begins at about 7pm due to late sunsets and in winter it starts at around 6pm. Hundreds of people gather at the ghat every evening to watch the event.

== 2010 terrorist bombing ==
On 7 December 2010, a low-intensity blast occurred near the southern end the Dashashwamedh Ghat, known as the Sitla Ghat during the evening aarti. The blast killed two people and injured 37 others, including six foreign tourists. The Indian Mujahideen claimed responsibility for the attack.
