= Blue Army (Aerosmith) =

Fandom of Aerosmith

Aerosmith's Blue Army is the American hard rock band's nickname for their loyal fanbase. The term was coined by the band around 1975. "Blue" referred to the blue denim jeans and jean jackets as well as the blue collar demographic of their fans. "Army" referred to their loyalty, youthfulness, and tough demeanor. Aerosmith guitarist Joe Perry describes the Blue Army: "We drove up to the gig and the line went around the building, long-haired teenage boys wearing blue denim jackets and jeans. An army of blue jeans. Our people." He also describes them as being predominantly male: "Aerosmith back then was definitely a guy thing. It used to be the only girls at Aerosmith shows were the ones hoping to blow us on the bus."

The "army" characteristic of Aerosmith fans (and hard rock fans in general) in the 1970s was also often alluded to in the press. A Rolling Stone magazine review described fans arriving at an Aerosmith concert in Pontiac, Michigan on May 8, 1976 as "a boozy army of hard hats coming to dismantle the place. They looked like hell. Nobody dresses up for concerts anymore." The band and fans still often use the term, more informally however, to describe Aerosmith's fan base. Aerosmith's official fan club is called Aero Force One.

Aerosmith named their 2015 concert tour, "The Blue Army Tour", in honor of their fanbase.

== See also ==
- Kiss Army
- Deadheads
