= Classic Hall =

Indoor arena in Olinda, Brazil

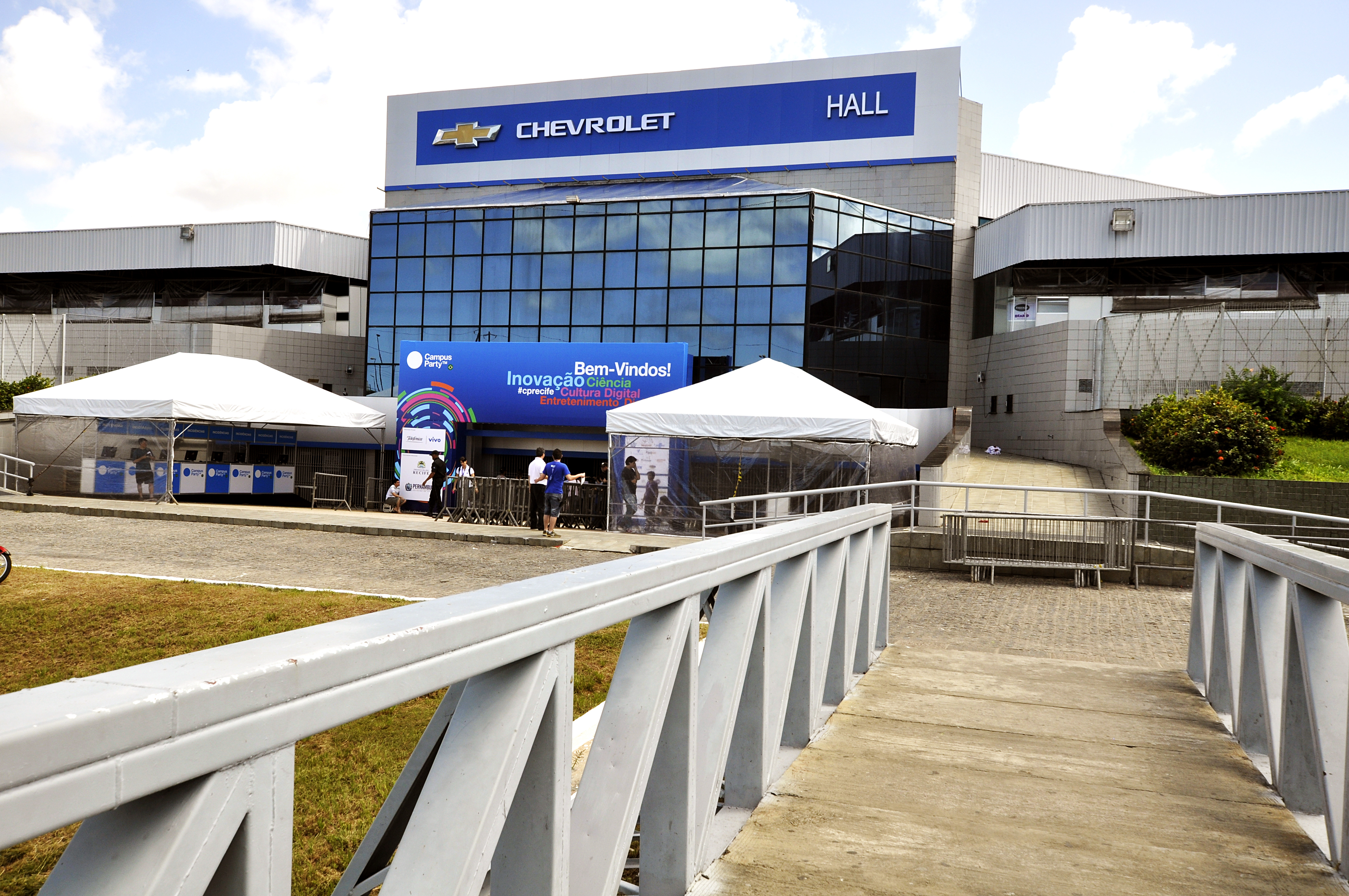
- Former names: Chevrolet Hall (2004–2015)
- Location: Av. Agamenon Magalhães, Complexo de Salgadinho, Olinda, Pernambuco, Brazil
- Capacity: 18,000

Construction
- Opened: August 8, 2001

Classic Hall is a multi-purpose indoor arena located in Olinda, Brazil.

The arena was opened on August 8, 2001, and is considered as one of the largest concert halls in Latin America, with a stage of 1,000 square meters, and in a total area of 2.7 hectares.

In July 2004, American automobile company Chevrolet announced that it would be acquiring the naming rights for the arena, which became Chevrolet Hall. In 2015, the arena was renamed Classic Hall.

== Concerts ==
The following is a list of concerts, showing date, artist or band, tour, opening acts, attendance and revenue held at Classic Hall.

Year	Date	Artist(s) (Opening act)	Tour	Attendance	Revenue	Ref.
2003	May 9	Silverchair	Across The Night Tour	—N/a		
2003	September 13	Deep Purple	Bananas World Tour	—N/a		
2004	October 24	The Offspring	Splinter Tour	—N/a		
2006	April 1	Banda Calypso	—N/a			
2007	August 11	Scorpions	Humanity World Tour	—N/a		
2008	September 7	Scorpions	Humanity World Tour	—N/a		
2009	January 30	Alanis Morissette	Flavors of Entanglement Tour	10,850 / 10,850	$169,658	
2009	March 21	Simple Plan	Simple Plan Tour	—N/a		
2010	March 18	A-ha	Ending on a High Note Tour	10,726 / 12,886	$531,816	
2010	April 16	Simply Red	Farewell – The Final Tour	5,243 / 11,190	$371,666	
2010	October 22	The Cranberries	Reunion Tour	—N/a		
2011	February 18	Backstreet Boys	This Is Us Tour	—N/a		
2011	February 19	Cyndi Lauper	Memphis Blues Tour	—N/a		
2011	November 20	Ringo Starr & His All-Starr Band	Eleventh All-Starr Band	—N/a		
2012	May 18	Roxette	The Neverending World Tour	4,836 / 11,315	$254,542	
2012	September 12	Alanis Morissette	Guardian Angel Tour	2,151 / 11,506	$126,302	
2012	October 11	Evanescence (The Used)	Evanescence Tour	5,775 / 7,500	$318,897	
2013	March 10	Elton John	40th Anniversary of the Rocket Man	3,160 / 4,600	$1,110,400	
2013	April 13	Fireflight (Oficina G3)	Brazil Tour	—N/a		
2014	April 15	Guns N' Roses	Appetite for Democracy	10,630 / 12,000	$1,180,640	
2014	October 10	Dream Theater	Along for the Ride	3,589 / 7,000	$198,449	
2015	March 15	Joss Stone	Total World Tour	—N/a		
2015	June 6	Backstreet Boys	In a World Like This Tour	—N/a		
2015	October 8	A-ha	Cast in Steel Tour	—N/a		
2016	October 21	Aerosmith	Rock 'N' Roll Rumble Tour	—N/a		
2018	August 25	Laura Pausini	World Wide Tour 2018	—N/a		
2022	July 13	A-ha	Hunting High and Low Tour 2018-2022	—N/a		

== See also ==
- List of indoor arenas in Brazil
