= Aero Force One =

Fan club for the band Aerosmith

Aero Force One

Aero Force One is the fan club for American hard rock band Aerosmith.

== Background ==
The origins of the fan club were rooted in the mid-1970s, when the band first broke through with their album Toys in the Attic. The band became a popular act with a loyal following of fans, often referred to as the "Blue Army". Former Aerosmith guitarist and band friend Ray Tabano got the idea of printing simple T-shirts with the classic Aerosmith "wings" logo. 100 of these T-shirts were printed and sold out within a matter of minutes at an Aerosmith concert. As a result, the band decided to form an official fan club with member dues. Its main source of revenue was T-shirt sales, and Ray Tabano would also write up newsletters and send them to members. The fan club was run by Tabano out of the band's headquarters, the Wherehouse, in Waltham, Massachusetts.

As the band's popularity grew and things within the band began to change, Tabano was fired by band managers Steve Leber and David Krebs with little severance. When the band resurrected in the mid-late 1980s and band management changed, the fan club adopted a more professional look and its headquarters was moved out to San Francisco.

Sometime in the late 1990s, the fan club moved back to Boston and has since been operated by a variety of outside agencies. The fan club is currently operated by BubbleUp in The Woodlands, Texas.

== Functions ==
Aero Force One is a significant part of Aerosmith. Being over 25 years old, some fan club members have seniority of 10 years or more. The associated website, AeroForceOne.com, is the primary source of news, information, and media relating to the band, and is the most frequently updated of the band's three official websites. The fan club is also the point-of-purchase for official Aerosmith merchandise. The band's merchandise collection, which offers new items all the time, includes everything from T-shirts and sweatshirts, to coffee mugs and hats, to doormats and blankets, as well as jewelry designed by a fan and worn by Steven Tyler. The fan club offers premium concert ticket seating and a variety of special packages to members, based on seniority and the price levels members are willing to pay. The club's Premium tickets are the same price as public onsale tickets and include a collectible tour pin. The Aero Force One VIP packages cost as much as $1300 each; these typically include a seat in the first five rows, gift bag, pre-show party, and meet and greet with Steven Tyler and Joe Perry.

The new All-Access Level 2015 membership package includes Access to Aerosmith Presale Tickets and VIP Packages (4 ticket limit), Official 2015 Aero Force One Membership T-shirt, Official 2015 Aero Force One Collectible Membership Pin, and Official 2015 Aero Force One Limited Edition Bandana. It also includes Contests, Prizes, Giveaways and 10% Off All Items in the AF1 Store. The price of All-Access Membership is $39.99 + shipping and handling ($12.99 US/$17.99 International).

== See also ==
- Blue Army
