= Tim Collins (band manager) =

American band manager

Tim Collins is a businessman and band manager, most noted for being the American hard rock band Aerosmith's manager from 1984 until 1996.

== Personal history ==
While students at St. Mary's High School in Waltham, Massachusetts, Collins, on guitar, formed the band Valley Decision with John Voymus on keyboard, Kevin Wormsley on drums, and Bill Walsh on bass guitar. The band was named after the Walt Whitman poem and competed in the Waltham Battle of the Bands.

At 14, Collins joined the band Tax Free. He played guitar but also had responsibility for managing booking and finances. While in the band and going to school, Collins worked full-time as a salesman at Anderson-Little, a men's clothing retailer, using his earnings to buy the band a sound system and a truck. In 1970, Tax Free replaced Collins as guitarist, telling him "you make a better manager than a guitarist”, and he became their manager.

Collins attended Bentley College in Waltham, graduating with a degree in Organizational Behavior and Marketing.

While continuing to manage Tax Free, Collins formed Bands Unlimited Productions to book local Boston talent playing area colleges and night clubs. In 1977, he signed the Fools, a young rock band.

In 1978, Collins moved to New York City to work for Castle Music Productions Inc., bringing the Fools as a client. Collins worked for artist manager Peter Casperson. The Fools, supported by Castle Music's greater resources, had charting singles, "Psycho Chicken" and "It's a Night for Beautiful Girls". Shortly after, EMI Records signed the band and put them on a U.S. tour with the Knack. After the tour, the band recorded their debut album, Sold Out, in Miami.

On April 1, 1979, Collins left Castle Music to start the Collins/Barrasso Agency, headquartered in Allston, Massachusetts. His partner was Steve Barrasso, whose tenure in a Boston band, Calamity Jane, was cut short by a lung condition. Barasso had convinced Collins to start their own business. The Collins/Barrasso Agency represented many New England–based regional recording artists, including Jonathan Edwards, whom Collins met while at Castle Music and was known for the song "Sunshine", Aztec Two-Step; the James Montgomery Blues Band, Duke and the Drivers; and Orleans. The agency also produced shows at colleges and larger concert venues throughout New England.

== History with Aerosmith ==
In the early 1980s, Collins was the manager for the Joe Perry Project, the solo project created by guitarist Joe Perry, who left Aerosmith in 1979.

Collins orchestrated the reformation of the original Aerosmith, engineering an intervention with Aerosmith members that led them to become clean and sober. Guitarists Joe Perry and Brad Whitford agreed to rejoin the band in April 1984, and it was officially reformed in May 1984 with Collins as their manager.

In mid-1984, after every major record label passed on signing them, Collins and music attorney Brian Rohan inspired John Kalodner to sign Aerosmith to Geffen Records. The band toured extensively and in 1985 recorded Done with Mirrors. The album, however, was not a success. The band did not attract mainstream publicity, and the band members were having addiction relapses.

Collins and his team, with the help of Dr. Louis Cox of New York City, orchestrated a drug and alcohol intervention with lead singer Steven Tyler. He successfully completed a drug rehabilitation program at the Caron Foundation in Pennsylvania. Shortly thereafter, the rest of the band followed suit.

During this time, Collins was instrumental in getting Aerosmith's agreement to have Tyler and Perry collaborate with Run-DMC on their cover of Aerosmith's "Walk This Way". The song and video brought Aerosmith renewed attention and publicity.

By 1987, all the Aerosmith members were clean and the band released Permanent Vacation. Kalodner and Collins also had forged a creative partnership, enlisting outside songwriters and producers to work and tour with the band, including Guns N' Roses. In the seven years between 1987 and 1994, the band released three albums and a compilation: Permanent Vacation, Pump, Get a Grip and Big Ones. Collectively, the albums sold 23 million copies in the United States, and Aerosmith won three Grammy awards and numerous Video Music Awards.

At the end of 1994, the 18-month Get a Grip Tour concluded, and the band wanted to take an extensive break before recording its next Columbia Records album, Nine Lives. Columbia, however, had a substantial investment in the band and did not want the record delayed. Executives pressured Collins and the band for a faster release. Collins and his team created structure for the band to more timely meet their contractual obligation, but the band members did not like it. Recording for Aerosmith was a long process, often causing contention among the bandmates. In the mid-1990s, Tyler and Perry were working with producer and songwriter Glen Ballard, writing, recording, and rehearsing songs, often in sessions in Miami, Florida. This, however, was not unusual, as the two often wrote together and brought songs back to the band.

Nonetheless, Columbia executives felt that, since Tyler and Perry were working independently with Ballard and the entire band would not be working together for months at a time, Aerosmith could break up. Drummer Joey Kramer also experienced health issues during pre-production. Columbia was afraid that Collins could not get the band to meet its commitments. The situation created significant tension, and Aerosmith fired Collins in July 1996.

== Life After Aerosmith ==
Collins has remained active in the music, recovery, and business communities. Through his company, Collins Management, he is often a "turn-around" consultant for artists, corporations, and non-profits around the globe. He frequently lectures or speaks at colleges. Now residing in Arizona, he is active in the design and implementation of 12-Step Recovery Programs. He also mentors students and is active with environmental issues, dog training (for disabilities and rescue), writing, and photography.

Collins is on or has served on the following boards:

- Board of Trustees, Berklee College of Music.
- Board of Advisors, Caron Foundation (Alcohol Recovery Treatment Center).
- Board of Advisors of Musicians Assistance Program (MAP) (now called MusiCares), a part of the National Academy of Recording Arts and Sciences.

In 2009, Tim Collins did an interview for the Biography Channel's show on Aerosmith that later aired on the A&E Network. The Boston Globe said the interview was a "real surprise" and was his first since being fired thirteen years before.

Collins told the Boston Herald, "I've never done an interview like this, but time heals all wounds. They said Steven (Tyler) wasn't going to participate and had squelched a lot of people. I just think they're America's greatest rock band, and I wanted to set the record straight. I was only supposed to do 30 minutes, but I let them keep me on tape for 4.5 hours." Collins said Aerosmith guitarists Joe Perry and Brad Whitford saw a raw cut of his interview, and it prompted them to speak. In answer to a question about whether he would consider managing the band again, Collins told the Herald, "I haven't spoken to them. I really couldn't imagine it. Life moves on."

In mid-2009, Collins and Tyler encountered each other in the lobby of the Ritz Carlton Hotel in Denver, Colorado. Regarding the incident, Collins said "It's always nice to have a situation come full circle and to be friends (once again) with someone who was so important in your earlier life."
