= Peace Out: The Farewell Tour =

2023 concert tour by Aerosmith

- Tour by Aerosmith
- Promotional poster for the tour
- Location: North America
- Start date: September 2, 2023
- End date: September 9, 2023
- Legs: 1
- No. of shows: 3
- Supporting act: The Black Crowes

Aerosmith concert chronology
- Deuces Are Wild (2019–22); Peace Out: The Farewell Tour (2023); California Dream On: Aerosmith & Friends (2026)

Peace Out: The Farewell Tour was the final concert tour by American rock band Aerosmith. The tour began on September 2, 2023, in Philadelphia and was set to conclude on February 26, 2025 in Buffalo, New York. However, it was postponed and suspended after three shows due to lead singer Steven Tyler suffering vocal cord damage. Unable to recover, on August 2, 2024, Aerosmith announced that would cease touring effective immediately, cancelling the remainder of the tour. The Black Crowes were the opening act for the tour.

== Background ==
On May 1, 2023, Aerosmith announced the farewell tour on Instagram stating, "PEACE OUT! After 50 years, 10 world tours, and playing for over 100 million fans… It's time for one last go!" A video announcement about the tour was also made featuring celebrities such as Terry Crews, Ringo Starr, Eminem, Kelly Clarkson, Slash, Bill Burr, Dolly Parton and others all in disbelief about the farewell tour. Joey Kramer will not be a part of this tour to "focus his full attention on his family and health." The band initially postponed several shows on their tour on September 11, 2023, after Tyler suffered vocal cord damage and received doctors' orders not to sing for at least 30 days, but further postponed their tour to 2024 after Tyler's vocal injury was found to be worse than initially thought.

On April 10, 2024, the band announced 39 all-new dates for the tour. The Black Crowes are set to return as the tour's opening act, and the tour was scheduled to begin in Pittsburgh on September 20, 2024. On August 2, 2024 the tour was canceled and the band announced their immediate retirement from touring due to Tyler being unable to recover from his vocal cord injury.

== Show synopsis ==
The stage is in the shape of an A with "flanked inflatable wings", and also features ramps and walkways. The show begins with "Back in the Saddle" and finishes with "Walk This Way". During, "Toys in the Attic", they recreated the Toys in the Attic album cover by releasing inflatable toys from the ceiling. The show is two hours long.

== Critical reception ==
Shaun Brady of The Philadelphia Inquirer attended the opening show in Philadelphia and said, "Aerosmith's major strength is their ability to make such a grand-scale performance feel like a raw and raucous club date. Even after however many thousands of performances, the boys from Boston never came off as jaundiced professionals, their chemistry forever loose and sleazy, the cracks and tatters showing in Tyler's voice adding to the alluringly rough edges." Writing for the Pittsburgh Tribune-Review, Mike Palm wrote, "If Wednesday night's concert was truly Aerosmith's last show in Pittsburgh, the veteran rockers from Boston went out with a blast — of music and confetti."

== Set list ==
This set list is from the September 2, 2023, show in Philadelphia, and is not intended to represent all dates throughout the tour.

1. "Back in the Saddle"
2. "Love in an Elevator"
3. "Cryin'"
4. "Janie's Got a Gun"
5. "Adam's Apple"
6. "Livin' on the Edge"
7. "No More No More"
8. "Rag Doll"
9. "Hangman Jury"
10. "Seasons of Wither"
11. "Movin' Out"
12. "Stop Messin' Round" (Fleetwood Mac cover)
13. "Rats in the Cellar"
14. "I Don't Want to Miss a Thing"
15. "Sweet Emotion"
16. "Toys in the Attic"
  Encore
17. "Dream On"
18. "Walk This Way"

== Tour dates ==
List of 2023 concerts
Date	City	Country	Venue	Opening act
September 2	Philadelphia	United States	Wells Fargo Center	The Black Crowes
September 6	Pittsburgh	United States	PPG Paints Arena	The Black Crowes
September 9	Elmont	United States	UBS Arena	The Black Crowes

=== Cancelled dates ===
List of cancelled concerts
Date	City	Country	Venue
September 20, 2024	Pittsburgh	United States	PPG Paints Arena
September 23, 2024	Philadelphia	United States	Wells Fargo Center
September 26, 2024	Louisville	United States	KFC Yum! Center
September 29, 2024	Cleveland	United States	Rocket Mortgage Fieldhouse
October 2, 2024	Charlotte	United States	Spectrum Center
October 5, 2024	Knoxville	United States	Thompson–Boling Arena
October 8, 2024	Washington, D.C.	United States	Capital One Arena
October 11, 2024	Atlanta	United States	State Farm Arena
October 14, 2024	St. Louis	United States	Enterprise Center
October 17, 2024	Cincinnati	United States	Heritage Bank Center
October 20, 2024	Nashville	United States	Bridgestone Arena
October 31, 2024	Phoenix	United States	Footprint Center
November 3, 2024	San Antonio	United States	Frost Bank Center
November 6, 2024	Austin	United States	Moody Center
November 9, 2024	Dallas	United States	American Airlines Center
November 12, 2024	Tulsa	United States	BOK Center
November 15, 2024	Omaha	United States	CHI Health Center
November 18, 2024	Denver	United States	Ball Arena
November 21, 2024	Portland	United States	Moda Center
November 24, 2024	Seattle	United States	Climate Pledge Arena
November 27, 2024	Salt Lake City	United States	Delta Center
November 30, 2024	San Francisco	United States	Chase Center
December 4, 2024	San Jose	United States	SAP Center
December 7, 2024	Inglewood	United States	Kia Forum
December 28, 2024	Newark	United States	Prudential Center
December 31, 2024	Boston	United States	TD Garden
January 4, 2025	Detroit	United States	Little Caesars Arena
January 7, 2025	Toronto	Canada	Scotiabank Arena
January 10, 2025	Montreal	Canada	Bell Centre
January 13, 2025	Columbus	United States	Schottenstein Center
January 16, 2025	Indianapolis	United States	Gainbridge Fieldhouse
January 19, 2025	Chicago	United States	United Center
January 22, 2025	Saint Paul	United States	Xcel Energy Center
January 25, 2025	Kansas City	United States	T-Mobile Center
February 11, 2025	Orlando	United States	Kia Center
February 14, 2025	Tampa	United States	Amalie Arena
February 17, 2025	Sunrise	United States	Amerant Bank Arena
February 20, 2025	Raleigh	United States	PNC Arena
February 23, 2025	New York City	United States	Madison Square Garden
February 26, 2025	Buffalo	United States	KeyBank Center

== Personnel ==
Aerosmith

- Steven Tyler – lead vocals, piano
- Joe Perry – guitar, backing vocals
- Tom Hamilton – bass
- Brad Whitford – guitar

Additional musicians

- Buck Johnson – keyboards, backing vocals
- John Douglas – drums
