= Deuces Are Wild (residency) =

Aerosmith's concert residency

- Residency by Aerosmith
- Location: Paradise, Nevada; Oxon Hill, Maryland; Atlantic City, New Jersey; Springfield, Massachusetts
- Venue: Park Theater; The Theater at MGM National Harbor; Borgata Event Center; MassMutual Center
- Start date: April 6, 2019
- End date: November 29, 2022
- Legs: 8
- No. of shows: 64 (residency only); 67 (including non-residency performances)

Aerosmith concert chronology
- Aero-Vederci Baby! Tour (2017–18); Deuces Are Wild (2019–22); Peace Out: The Farewell Tour (2023)

Deuces Are Wild was a concert residency by American hard rock band Aerosmith that lasted from April 2019 until November 2022, with 55 concerts at the Park Theater on the Las Vegas Strip in Paradise, Nevada, nine concerts at three MGM venues on the East Coast (three shows at the MGM National Harbor in Maryland, two shows at the Borgata in Atlantic City, New Jersey, and four shows at the MassMutual Center in Massachusetts), as well as a July 2019 festival performance in Minnesota, and two performances in New England in September 2022. This marked Aerosmith's first concert residency. The residency originally consisted of 18 Las Vegas concerts scheduled from April through July of 2019, but 17 additional Vegas concerts and the nine East Coast concerts were added due to high demand. An additional 15 shows in 2020 were added due to continued demand. The band announced a six-week European tour would take place during the summer of 2020 following the last of the residency dates. Due to the COVID-19 pandemic, the band announced on April 14, 2020 that the residency dates would be postponed; the European dates were subsequently cancelled. On March 23, 2022, the band announced new 2022 dates from September through December 2022. The December dates were cancelled as the result of lead singer Steven Tyler checking into rehab.

Aerosmith announced the residency at an appearance on NBC's Today show on August 15, 2018. The name of the residency, "Deuces are Wild", was a reference to both Las Vegas casino gambling and their 1994 single of the same name.

The show was rendered in Dolby Atmos.

== Shows ==
List of concerts, showing date, city, and venue
Date	City	Venue
Leg 1
April 6, 2019	Las Vegas	Park Theater
April 8, 2019	Las Vegas	Park Theater
April 11, 2019	Las Vegas	Park Theater
April 13, 2019	Las Vegas	Park Theater
April 16, 2019	Las Vegas	Park Theater
April 18, 2019	Las Vegas	Park Theater
April 21, 2019	Las Vegas	Park Theater
April 23, 2019	Las Vegas	Park Theater
April 26, 2019	Las Vegas	Park Theater
Leg 2
June 19, 2019	Las Vegas	Park Theater
June 22, 2019	Las Vegas	Park Theater
June 24, 2019	Las Vegas	Park Theater
June 27, 2019	Las Vegas	Park Theater
June 29, 2019	Las Vegas	Park Theater
July 2, 2019	Las Vegas	Park Theater
July 4, 2019	Las Vegas	Park Theater
July 7, 2019	Las Vegas	Park Theater
July 9, 2019	Las Vegas	Park Theater
Leg 3
August 8, 2019	Oxon Hill	The Theater at MGM National Harbor
August 10, 2019	Oxon Hill	The Theater at MGM National Harbor
August 13, 2019	Oxon Hill	The Theater at MGM National Harbor
August 16, 2019	Atlantic City	Borgata Event Center
August 18, 2019	Atlantic City	Borgata Event Center
August 21, 2019	Springfield	MassMutual Center
August 24, 2019	Springfield	MassMutual Center
August 26, 2019	Springfield	MassMutual Center
August 29, 2019	Springfield	MassMutual Center
Leg 4
September 21, 2019	Las Vegas	Park Theater
September 23, 2019	Las Vegas	Park Theater
September 26, 2019	Las Vegas	Park Theater
September 28, 2019	Las Vegas	Park Theater
October 1, 2019	Las Vegas	Park Theater
October 3, 2019	Las Vegas	Park Theater
October 6, 2019	Las Vegas	Park Theater
October 8, 2019	Las Vegas	Park Theater
Leg 5
November 14, 2019	Las Vegas	Park Theater
November 16, 2019	Las Vegas	Park Theater
November 19, 2019	Las Vegas	Park Theater
November 21, 2019	Las Vegas	Park Theater
November 24, 2019	Las Vegas	Park Theater
November 26, 2019	Las Vegas	Park Theater
November 29, 2019	Las Vegas	Park Theater
December 1, 2019	Las Vegas	Park Theater
December 4, 2019	Las Vegas	Park Theater
Leg 6
January 29, 2020	Las Vegas	Park Theater
January 31, 2020	Las Vegas	Park Theater
February 3, 2020	Las Vegas	Park Theater
February 5, 2020	Las Vegas	Park Theater
February 8, 2020	Las Vegas	Park Theater
February 10, 2020	Las Vegas	Park Theater
February 13, 2020	Las Vegas	Park Theater
February 15, 2020	Las Vegas	Park Theater
Leg 7
September 14, 2022	Las Vegas	Dolby Live
September 17, 2022	Las Vegas	Dolby Live
September 20, 2022	Las Vegas	Dolby Live
September 23, 2022	Las Vegas	Dolby Live
September 26, 2022	Las Vegas	Dolby Live
September 29, 2022	Las Vegas	Dolby Live
October 2, 2022	Las Vegas	Dolby Live
October 5, 2022	Las Vegas	Dolby Live
November 19, 2022	Las Vegas	Dolby Live
November 23, 2022	Las Vegas	Dolby Live
November 26, 2022	Las Vegas	Dolby Live
November 29, 2022	Las Vegas	Dolby Live

=== Non-residency shows ===
List of concerts, showing date, city, and venue
Date	City	Venue
July 19, 2019	Shakopee	Canterbury Park (Twin Cities Summer Jam)
September 4, 2022	Bangor	Maine Savings Amphitheater
September 8, 2022	Boston	Fenway Park (50th Anniversary Show)

== Personnel ==
- Steven Tyler – lead vocals
- Joe Perry – guitar, backing vocals
- Tom Hamilton – bass
- Joey Kramer – drums (through mid-2019)
- Brad Whitford – guitar
- Buck Johnson – keyboards, backing vocals
- John Douglas – drums (mid-2019–2022)
