= Aero-Vederci Baby! Tour =

2017–18 concert tour by Aerosmith

- Tour by Aerosmith
- Location: Asia; Europe; North America; South America
- Start date: April 2, 2017
- End date: May 5, 2018
- Legs: 4
- No. of shows: 24

Aerosmith concert chronology
- Rock 'N' Roll Rumble Tour (2016); Aero-Vederci Baby! Tour (2017–18); Deuces Are Wild (2019–22)

The Aero-Vederci Baby! Tour was a concert tour by American hard rock band Aerosmith. Road manager Tommy Higgins came up with the tour's title.

The tour started with a free show in Phoenix, Arizona, and took the band through Europe and South America. The band performed in the country of Georgia for the first time in their career. The final four shows of the tour were cancelled after lead singer Steven Tyler had health problems.

The band resumed performances a year later on April 6, 2019, with their Deuces Are Wild residency in Las Vegas.

== Tour dates ==
List of 2017 concerts
| Date | City | Country | Venue | Attendance | Revenue |
|---|---|---|---|---|---|
| April 2, 2017 | Phoenix | United States | March Madness Music Festival | —N/a | —N/a |
| May 17, 2017 | Tel Aviv | Israel | Yarkon Park | —N/a | —N/a |
| May 20, 2017 | Batumi | Georgia | Black Sea Arena | —N/a | —N/a |
| May 23, 2017 | Moscow | Russia | Olimpiyskiy Arena | —N/a | —N/a |
| May 26, 2017 | Munich | Germany | Königsplatz, Munich | —N/a | —N/a |
| May 30, 2017 | Berlin | Germany | Waldbühne | —N/a | —N/a |
| June 2, 2017 | Kraków | Poland | Tauron Arena | —N/a | —N/a |
| June 5, 2017 | Copenhagen | Denmark | Royal Arena | —N/a | —N/a |
| June 8, 2017 | Sölvesborg | Sweden | Sweden Rock Festival | —N/a | —N/a |
| June 11, 2017 | Donington | England | Download Festival | —N/a | —N/a |
| June 14, 2017 | Dublin | Ireland | 3Arena | —N/a | —N/a |
| June 17, 2017 | Clisson | France | Hellfest | —N/a | —N/a |
| June 20, 2017 | Cologne | Germany | Lanxess Arena | —N/a | —N/a |
| June 23, 2017 | Florence | Italy | Firenze Rocks Festival | —N/a | —N/a |
| June 26, 2017 | Lisbon | Portugal | MEO Arena | —N/a | —N/a |
| June 29, 2017 | Madrid | Spain | Auditorio Miguel Ríos | —N/a | —N/a |
| July 2, 2017 | Barcelona | Spain | Rock Fest BCN | —N/a | —N/a |
| July 5, 2017 | Zürich | Switzerland | Hallenstadion | 13,000 / 13,000 | $1,978,310 |
| July 8, 2017 | Santa Cruz de Tenerife | Spain | Estadio Heliodoro Rodríguez López | —N/a | —N/a |
| September 15, 2017 | Quito | Ecuador | Estadio Olimpico Atahualpa | 15,194 / 30,000 | $1,083,075 |
| September 18, 2017 | Belo Horizonte | Brazil | Esplanada do Mineirão | 15,754 / 18,000 | $1,196,660 |
| September 21, 2017 | Rio de Janeiro | Brazil | Rock in Rio | 100,000 / 100,000 | —N/a |
| September 24, 2017 | São Paulo | Brazil | São Paulo Trip Festival | 39,328 / 45,000 | —N/a |
| November 1, 2017 | Arlington | United States | AT&T Stadium (private AT&T show) | —N/a | —N/a |

List of 2018 concerts
| Date | City | Country | Venue | Attendance | Revenue |
|---|---|---|---|---|---|
| May 5, 2018 | New Orleans | United States | New Orleans Jazz & Heritage Festival | —N/a | —N/a |
| Total | | | | — | — |

== Cancelled dates ==
| Date | City | Country | Venue | Reasoning |
|---|---|---|---|---|
| September 27, 2017 | Curitiba | Brazil | Pedreira Paulo Leminski | Steven Tyler's health problems. |
| September 30, 2017 | Santiago | Chile | Stgo Rock City Festival | Steven Tyler's health problems. |
| October 3, 2017 | Rosario | Argentina | Estadio Gigante de Arroyito | Steven Tyler's health problems. |
| October 7, 2017 | Monterrey | Mexico | Mother of All Rock Festival | Steven Tyler's health problems. |
