= Rock 'N' Roll Rumble Tour =

2016 concert tour by Aerosmith

- Tour by Aerosmith
- Location: North America; South America
- Start date: September 17, 2016
- End date: October 27, 2016
- Legs: 1
- No. of shows: 10

Aerosmith concert chronology
- Blue Army Tour (2015); Rock 'N' Roll Rumble Tour (2016); Aero-Vederci Baby! Tour (2017–18)

The Rock 'N' Roll Rumble Tour was a concert tour by American hard rock band Aerosmith. The tour sent the band to 9 locations across Latin America from late September to October 2016, preceded by a one-off festival performance in San Diego on September 17. The band performed at a mix of large outdoor festivals, stadiums, and arenas.

== Tour dates ==
Date	City	Country	Venue	Attendance	Box Office
North America
September 17, 2016 (Note: The September 17, 2016 concert in Del Mar was part of KAABOO Festival.)	Del Mar	United States	Del Mar Fairgrounds	—N/a	—N/a
South America
September 29, 2016	Bogotá	Colombia	Simón Bolívar Park	21,091 / 25,200	$2,470,640
October 2, 2016	Santiago	Chile	Movistar Arena	15,046 / 15,046	$1,621,400
October 5, 2016	Córdoba	Argentina	Estadio Presidente Juan Domingo Perón	—N/a	—N/a
October 8, 2016	La Plata	Argentina	Estadio Ciudad de La Plata	31,097 / 31,097	$2,949,370
October 11, 2016	Porto Alegre	Brazil	Estádio Beira-Rio	19,476 / 19,476	$1,948,600
October 15, 2016	São Paulo	Brazil	Allianz Parque	45,800 / 45,800	$4,297,140
October 21, 2016	Olinda	Brazil	Classic Hall	—N/a	—N/a
October 21, 2016	Lima	Peru	Estadio Nacional del Perú	—N/a	—N/a
North America
October 27, 2016	Mexico City	Mexico	Mexico City Arena	17,417 / 19,004	$1,297,540
Total				149,927 / 155,623 (96%)	$14,584,690

== Cancelled dates ==
Date	City	Country	Venue	Reasoning
October 18, 2016	Santa Cruz de la Sierra	Bolivia	Estadio Tahuichi Aguilera	Due to stage collapse. (Note: @AEROSMITH. SHOW TOMORROW NIGHT HAS BEEN CANCELLED AND WILL BE RESCHEDULED FOR A LATER DATE.)

== Personnel ==
Aerosmith

- Steven Tyler – lead vocals, harmonica, percussion
- Joe Perry – guitar, backing vocals, lap pedal steel, talkbox, lead vocals on "Stop Messin' Around"
- Brad Whitford – guitar
- Tom Hamilton – bass
- Joey Kramer – drums, percussion

Additional musicians

- Buck Johnson – keyboards, backing vocals
