= Blue Army Tour =

2015 concert tour by Aerosmith

- Tour by Aerosmith
- Location: North America
- Start date: June 10, 2015
- End date: September 5, 2015
- Legs: 1
- No. of shows: 17 in North America; 1 in Europe; 18 in total

Aerosmith concert chronology
- Let Rock Rule Tour (2014); Blue Army Tour (2015); Rock 'N' Roll Rumble Tour (2016)

The Blue Army Tour was a concert tour by American hard rock band Aerosmith. The tour sent the band to 17 locations across North America from June to August 2015, followed by a one-off performance in Moscow on September 5. The band started the tour in Glendale, Arizona on June 13, 2015. The band performed at a mix of large venues, small venues, and festivals. The tour saw the band perform in several locations they had never previously performed in, as well as locations the band had not performed in several years. The band played some lesser-known deep cuts on the tour.

== Tour dates ==
Date	City	Country	Venue	Attendance	Gross
North America
June 10, 2015	San Diego	United States	Petco Park (private Cisco event)		
June 13, 2015	Glendale	United States	Gila River Arena		
June 24, 2015	Evansville	United States	Ford Center		
June 27, 2015	Durant	United States	Choctaw Events Center		
June 30, 2015	Hidalgo	United States	State Farm Arena		
July 3, 2015	Stateline	United States	Harveys Outdoor Arena	7,093 / 7,093	$982,092
July 7, 2015	Santa Barbara	United States	Santa Barbara Bowl	4,563 / 4,563	$854,961
July 10, 2015	Salinas	United States	Salinas Sports Complex		
July 13, 2015	Kelowna	Canada	Prospera Place		
July 16, 2015	Victoria	Canada	Save on Foods Memorial Centre		
July 19, 2015	Fort McMurray	Canada	Shell Place		
July 22, 2015	Cheyenne	United States	Cheyenne Frontier Days		
July 25, 2015	Minot	United States	North Dakota State Fair	16,666	—
July 28, 2015	Ridgefield	United States	Sleep Country Amphitheater		
August 1, 2015	Las Vegas	United States	MGM Grand Garden Arena		
August 4, 2015	Grand Rapids	United States	Van Andel Arena	9,864 / 10,175	$859,201
August 7, 2015	Canton	United States	Tom Benson Hall of Fame Stadium		
Europe
September 5, 2015	Moscow	Russia	Lubyanka Square		

== Personnel ==
Aerosmith

- Steven Tyler - lead vocals, harmonica, percussion
- Joe Perry - guitar, backing vocals, lap pedal steel, talkbox, lead vocals on "Stop Messin' Around"
- Brad Whitford - guitar
- Tom Hamilton - bass
- Joey Kramer - drums, percussion

Additional musicians

- Buck Johnson - keyboards, backing vocals
