= Aerosmith =

American rock band

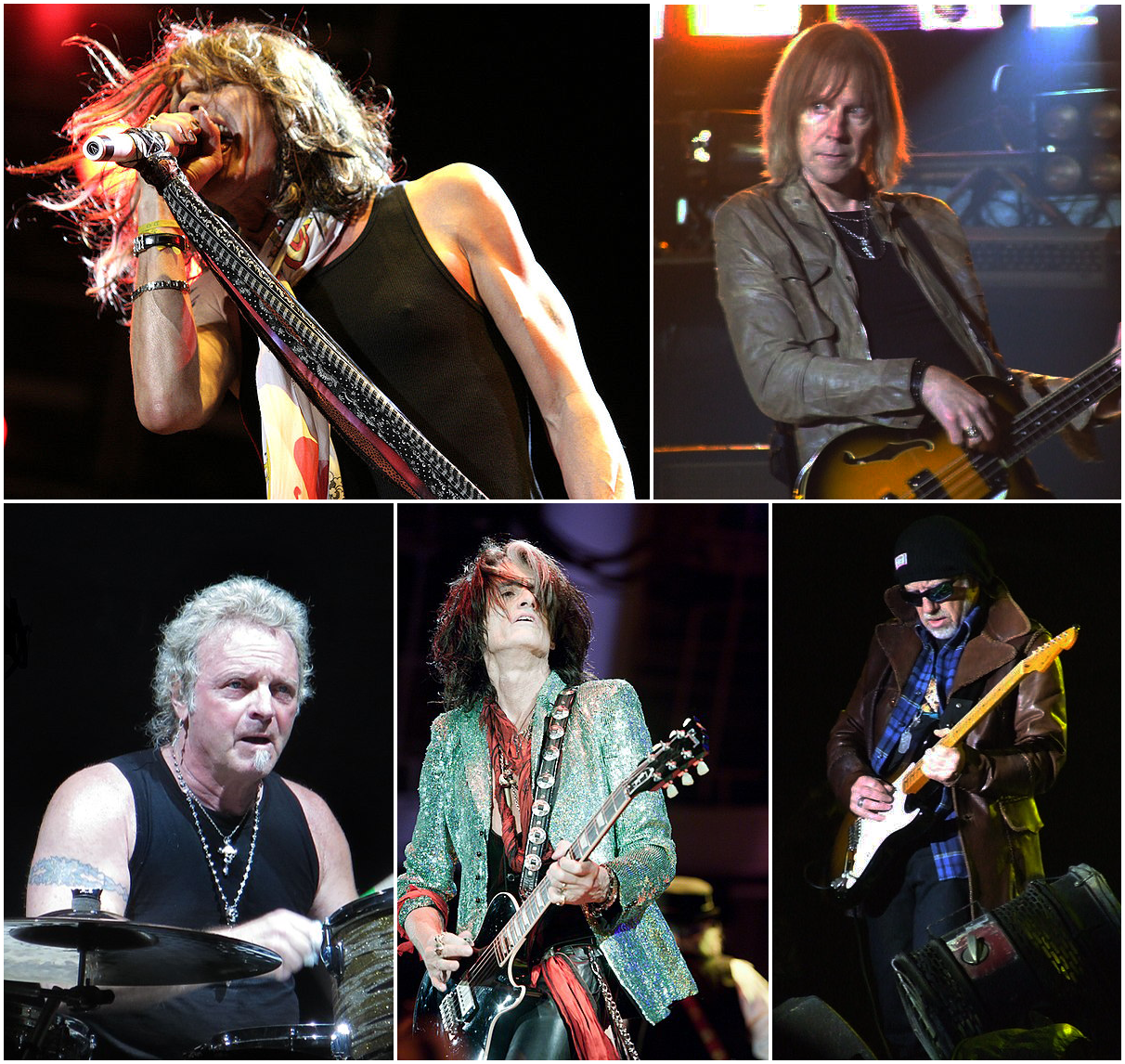
- Aerosmith members. Clockwise, from top left: Steven Tyler, Tom Hamilton, Brad Whitford, Joe Perry and Joey Kramer

Background information
- Origin: Boston, Massachusetts, U.S.
- Genres: Hard rock; blues rock; heavy metal
- Works: Discography; songs; videography; concert tours
- Years active: 1970–present
- Labels: Columbia; Geffen; Capitol
- Spinoffs: The Joe Perry Project; Whitford/St. Holmes
- Awards: Full list
- Members: Steven Tyler; Tom Hamilton; Joey Kramer; Joe Perry; Brad Whitford; (see § Band members for others)
- Website: aerosmith.com

Aerosmith is an American rock band formed in Boston in 1970. The group consists of lead vocalist Steven Tyler, bassist Tom Hamilton, drummer Joey Kramer, and guitarists Joe Perry and Brad Whitford. Their style, which is rooted in blues-based hard rock, has also incorporated elements of pop rock, heavy metal, glam metal, and rhythm and blues, and has inspired many subsequent rock artists. Aerosmith is sometimes referred to as "the Bad Boys from Boston" and "America's Greatest Rock and Roll Band". The primary songwriting team of Tyler and Perry is sometimes referred to as the "Toxic Twins".

Perry and Hamilton were originally in a band together, the Jam Band, where they met up with Tyler, Kramer, guitarist Ray Tabano, and formed Aerosmith; in 1971, Tabano was replaced by Whitford. They released a string of multi-platinum albums starting with their eponymous debut in 1973, followed a year later by Get Your Wings. The band broke into the mainstream with their next two albums, Toys in the Attic (1975) and Rocks (1976). Draw the Line and Night in the Ruts followed in 1977 and 1979, respectively. Throughout the 1970s, the band toured extensively and charted a dozen Hot 100 singles, including their first Top 40 hit "Sweet Emotion" and the Top 10 hits "Dream On" and "Walk This Way". By the end of the decade, they were among the most popular hard rock bands in the world and developed a following of fans, often referred to as the "Blue Army". Drug addiction and internal conflict led to the departures of Perry and Whitford in 1979 and 1981, respectively. The band did not fare well and the album Rock in a Hard Place (1982) failed to match previous successes.

Perry and Whitford returned to Aerosmith in 1984. After a comeback tour, they recorded Done with Mirrors (1985), which did not meet commercial expectations. It was not until a 1986 collaboration with rap group Run–D.M.C. on a remake of "Walk This Way", and the band's multi-platinum album, Permanent Vacation (1987), that they regained their previous level of popularity. In the late 1980s and 1990s, the band won numerous awards for music from the multi-platinum albums Pump (1989), Get a Grip (1993), and Nine Lives (1997), while they embarked on their most extensive concert tours to date. Their biggest hits during this period included "Dude (Looks Like a Lady)", "Angel", "Rag Doll", "Love in an Elevator", "Janie's Got a Gun", "What it Takes", "Livin' on the Edge", "Cryin'", and "Crazy". The band also filmed popular music videos and made notable appearances in television, film, and video games. In 1998, they achieved their first number-one hit with "I Don't Want to Miss a Thing" from the Armageddon soundtrack and the following year, their roller coaster attraction opened at Walt Disney World. Their comeback has been described as one of the most remarkable and spectacular in rock history. Additional albums Just Push Play (which included the hit "Jaded"), Honkin' on Bobo (a collection of blues covers), and Music from Another Dimension! followed in 2001, 2004, and 2012, respectively. In 2008, they released Guitar Hero: Aerosmith, which is considered to be the best-selling band-centric video game. From 2019 to 2022, the band had a concert residency in Las Vegas, which was interrupted from 2020 to 2021 due to the COVID-19 pandemic. After Tyler suffered and failed to recover from a vocal injury in 2023 during the third date of their farewell tour, Aerosmith retired from touring in 2024, though they still occasionally play one-off shows. The band released its first new music in thirteen years on the collaborative EP with Yungblud, One More Time, in 2025.

Aerosmith is the best-selling American hard rock band of all time, having sold more than 150 million records worldwide, including over 69.5 million records in the United States. With 25 gold, 18 platinum, and 12 multi-platinum albums, they hold the record for the most total certifications by an American group and are tied for the most multi-platinum albums by an American group. They have achieved twenty-one Top 40 hits on the US Hot 100, nine number-one Mainstream Rock hits, four Grammy Awards, six American Music Awards, and ten MTV Video Music Awards. They were inducted into the Rock and Roll Hall of Fame in 2001, and were ranked number 57 and 30, respectively, on Rolling Stone's and VH1's lists of the 100 Greatest Artists of All Time. In 2013, Tyler and Perry were inducted into the Songwriters Hall of Fame, and in 2020, the band received the MusiCares Person of the Year award.

== History ==
=== Formation (1964–1970) ===
In 1964, Steven Tyler, then a drummer, formed his own band, the Strangeurs—later renamed Chain Reaction—in Yonkers, New York. Meanwhile, Perry and Hamilton formed the Jam Band (commonly known as "Joe Perry's Jam Band"), which was based on free-form and blues. Hamilton and Perry moved to Boston, Massachusetts, in September 1969, where they met Joey Kramer, a drummer from Yonkers, New York, who was a student at the Berklee College of Music prior to going full-time with the Jam Band. Kramer also knew Tyler and had always hoped to play in a band with him.

In 1970, Chain Reaction and Jam Band played at the same gig in New Hampshire. Tyler immediately loved Jam Band's sound and wanted to combine the two bands. In October 1970, the bands met up again and considered the proposition. Tyler, who had been a drummer and backing vocalist in Chain Reaction, adamantly refused to play drums in this new band, insisting that he would take part only if he could be their frontman. The others agreed, and a new band was formed. The band moved into a home together at 1325 Commonwealth Avenue in Boston, where they wrote and rehearsed music together and relaxed in between shows.

The members of the band reportedly spent afternoons getting high and watching Three Stooges reruns. One day, they had a post-Stooges meeting to try to come up with a name. Kramer said that, when he was in school, he would write the word "aerosmith" all over his notebooks. The name had popped into his head after listening to Harry Nilsson's album Aerial Ballet, which featured jacket art of a circus performer jumping out of a biplane. Initially, Kramer's bandmates were unimpressed; they all thought he was referring to the Sinclair Lewis novel they were required to read in high school English class. "No, not Arrowsmith," Kramer explained. "A-E-R-O...Aerosmith." The band settled upon this name after also considering "the Hookers" and "Spike Jones". At some point prior to the weekend of December 25, 1971, they had also been known as "Fox Chase".

Soon, the band hired Ray Tabano, a childhood friend of Tyler, as rhythm guitarist and began playing local shows. Aerosmith played their first gig in Mendon, Massachusetts, at Nipmuc Regional High School (now Miscoe Hill Middle School) on November 6, 1970. In 1971, Tabano was replaced by Brad Whitford, who also attended the Berklee School of Music, and was formerly a member of the band Earth Inc. Whitford, from Reading, Massachusetts, had played at Reading's AW Coolidge Middle School. Other than a period from July 1979 to April 1984, the line-up of Tyler, Perry, Hamilton, Kramer, and Whitford has stayed the same.

=== Record deal, Aerosmith, Get Your Wings, and Toys in the Attic (1971–1975) ===
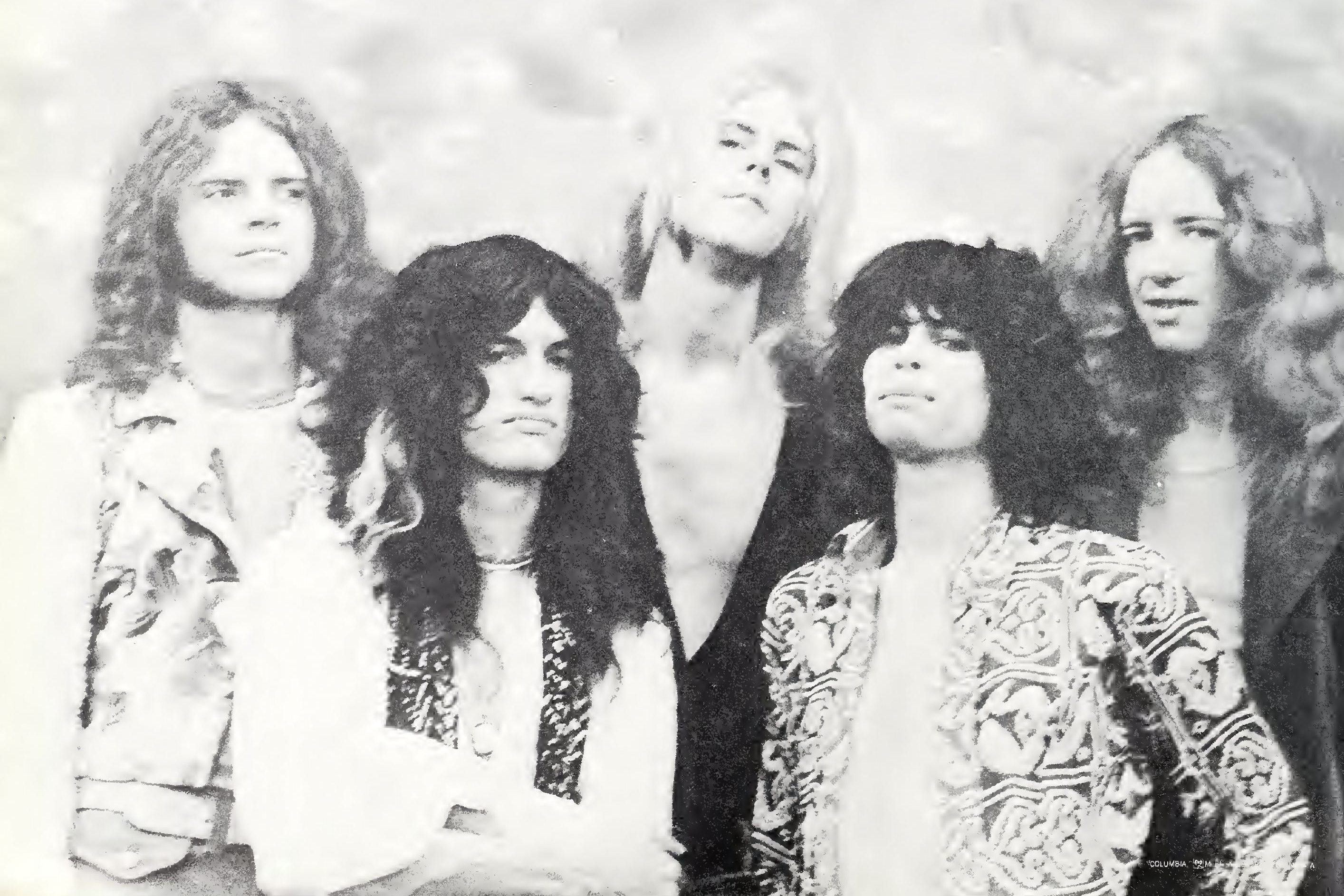
Aerosmith in 1972. This photo was the same one used for their debut album.

After forming the band and finalizing the lineup in 1971, the band started to garner some local success doing live shows. Originally booked through the Ed Malhoit Agency, the band signed a promotion deal with Frank Connelly, and eventually secured a management deal with David Krebs and Steve Leber in 1972. Krebs and Leber invited Columbia Records President Clive Davis to see the band at Max's Kansas City in New York City. Aerosmith was not originally scheduled to play that night at the club, but they paid out of their own pockets to secure a place on the bill, reportedly the only band ever to do so at Max's. "No Surprize" from their Night in the Ruts album celebrated the moment their fame rose.

Aerosmith signed with Columbia in mid-1972 for a reported $125,000, and recorded their debut album, Aerosmith. Released in January 1973, the album peaked at number 166. The album was straightforward rock and roll with well-defined blues influences, laying the groundwork for Aerosmith's signature blues rock sound. Although the highest-charting single from the album was "Dream On" at number 59, several tracks, such as "Mama Kin" and "Walkin' the Dog", would become staples of the band's live shows, and received airplay on rock radio. The album reached gold status initially, eventually went on to sell two million copies, and was certified double platinum after the band reached mainstream success over a decade later. After constant touring, the band released their second album, Get Your Wings in 1974, the first of a string of multi-platinum albums produced by Jack Douglas. This album included the rock radio hits "Same Old Song and Dance" and "Train Kept A-Rollin'", a cover done previously by the Yardbirds. The album also contained several fan favorites, including "Lord of the Thighs", "Seasons of Wither", and "S.O.S. (Too Bad)", darker songs that have become staples in the band's live shows. To date, Get Your Wings has sold three million copies.

In 1975, Aerosmith released their third album, Toys in the Attic, which established Aerosmith as international stars, competing with the likes of Led Zeppelin and the Rolling Stones. Originally derided as Rolling Stones knockoffs in part due to the physical resemblance between lead singers Steven Tyler and Mick Jagger, Toys in the Attic showed that Aerosmith was a unique and talented band in their own right. Toys in the Attic was an immediate success, starting with the single "Sweet Emotion", which became the band's first Top 40 hit. This was followed by a successful re-release of "Dream On" which hit No. 6, becoming their best charting single of the 1970s. "Walk This Way", re-released in 1976, reached the Top 10 in early 1977.

In addition, "Toys in the Attic" and "Big Ten Inch Record" (a song originally recorded by Bull Moose Jackson) became concert staples. As a result of this success, both of the band's previous albums re-charted. Toys in the Attic has gone on to become the band's bestselling studio album in the United States, with certified US sales of nine million copies. The band toured in support of Toys in the Attic, where they started to get more recognition. Also around this time, the band established their home base as "the wherehouse" in Waltham, Massachusetts, where they would record and rehearse music, as well as conduct business.

=== Rocks, Draw the Line, and Live! Bootleg (1976–1978) ===
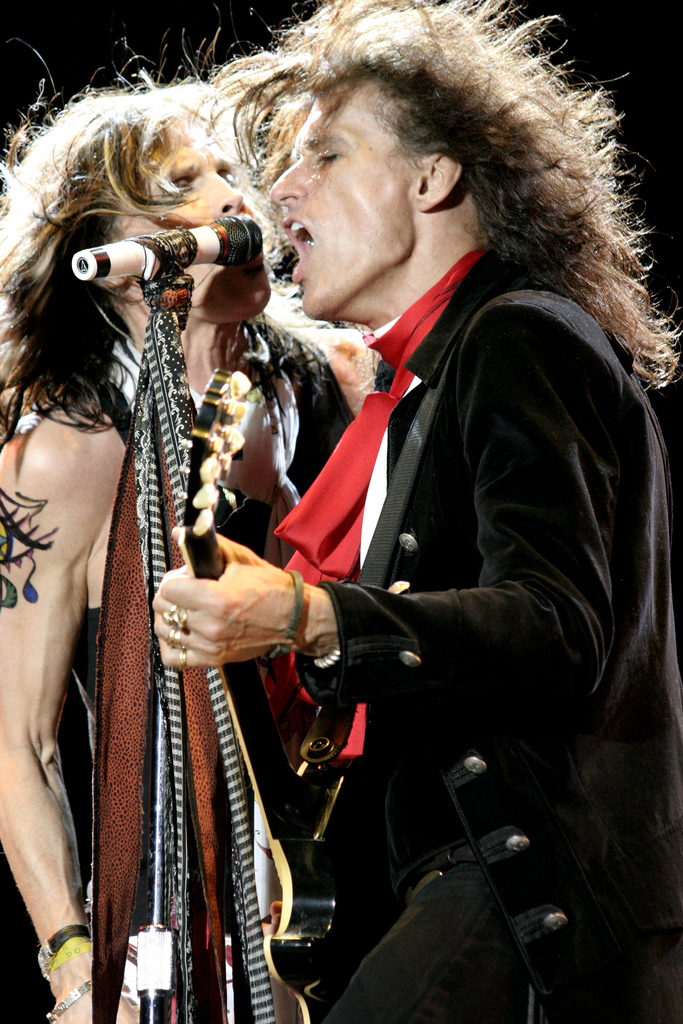
During the 1970s, Steven Tyler (left) and Joe Perry (right) became known as "the Toxic Twins" due to their extensive drug use

In 1976, Aerosmith's fourth album was Rocks, which music historian Greg Prato described as "captur[ing] Aerosmith at their most raw and rocking". It went platinum swiftly and featured two Top 40 hits, "Last Child" and "Back in the Saddle", as well as the ballad "Home Tonight", which also charted. Rocks would eventually go on to sell over four million copies. Both Toys in the Attic and Rocks are highly regarded, especially in the hard rock genre: they appear on such lists as Rolling Stone's 500 Greatest Albums of All Time and are cited as influential by members of Guns N' Roses, Metallica, and Mötley Crüe. Kurt Cobain also listed Rocks as one of the albums he thought were most influential to Nirvana's sound in his journal in 1993. Soon after Rocks was released, the band continued to tour heavily, this time headlining their own shows, including large stadiums and rock festivals.

In 1977, Aerosmith released their fifth album, Draw the Line. Its recording was affected by the band's excesses, but the record still had memorable moments. The title track charted just shy of the Top 40 and remains a live staple, and "Kings and Queens" also charted. The album went on to sell two million copies. The band toured extensively in support of the album, but drug abuse and the fast-paced life of touring and recording began affecting their performances. Tyler and Perry became known as "the Toxic Twins" due to their notorious abuse of drugs on and off the stage. Tyler later commented, "I've spent $64 million on drugs"; Perry scoffed later, "There's no fucking way in the world you could spend that much money on drugs and still be alive. It makes a good headline – but, practically speaking, that was probably a very small portion of where we spent our money."

While continuing to tour and record in the late 1970s, Aerosmith appeared in the Sgt. Pepper's Lonely Hearts Club Band movie. Their cover of The Beatles' "Come Together", from the soundtrack, was the band's last Top 40 hit for nearly 10 years. The double vinyl Live! Bootleg, issued in 1978, captured the band's rawness during the Draw the Line tour. The standalone single "Chip Away the Stone", also released in 1978, charted at number 77.

=== Departures of Joe Perry and Brad Whitford, Night in the Ruts, and Rock in a Hard Place (1979–1984) ===
In 1979, the band started work on their next album, Night in the Ruts, but Aerosmith decided to go on tour during a break in the recording schedule. As the decade was about to conclude, the band's drug use began taking its toll, and tensions were slowly coming to a head. The band's touring schedule brought them to Cleveland Stadium on July 28, 1979, where they headlined the World Series of Rock festival. Pandemonium erupted backstage when Joe Perry's wife, Elissa, threw a glass of milk at Tom Hamilton's wife, Terry. Following the show, Tyler and Perry got into a heated argument when Tyler confronted Perry about his wife's antics, and after the course of the argument, Perry left Aerosmith (while Tyler claims in his autobiography that he fired Perry from the band). Upon his departure, Perry took some of the music that he had written with him. Shortly after his departure, Perry formed his own side project known as The Joe Perry Project.

Since there was still work to be done on Night in the Ruts, Aerosmith needed fill-in musicians to take Perry's place on the songs that needed to be recorded to complete the album. Guitarist Brad Whitford took over some of the lead parts, and Richie Supa, the band's longtime writing partner, filled in where needed until the band was able to hire Jimmy Crespo to take over as the next full-time guitarist. Night in the Ruts was released in November 1979, but managed to sell only enough records to be certified gold at the time, although it would eventually sell enough copies to be certified platinum by 1994. The only single the album spawned, a cover of "Remember (Walking in the Sand)" by the Shangri-Las, peaked at number 67 on the Billboard Hot 100.

The tour for Night in the Ruts commenced shortly thereafter, but the band found themselves playing in smaller and smaller venues than before due to their popularity beginning to wane. Steven Tyler's drug issues were starting to affect his performance and songwriting, and he reached rock bottom in 1980, when he collapsed on stage during a show in Portland, Maine, and did not get up for the remainder of the set. Also in 1980, Aerosmith released their first compilation album, Greatest Hits. While the compilation did not chart very high initially, it gained popularity later, and went on to become the band's best selling album in the United States, with sales of 12 million copies. In the fall of 1980, Tyler was injured in a serious motorcycle accident, which left him hospitalized for two months, and unable to tour or record well into 1981.

In 1981, Aerosmith began work on their next album, Rock in a Hard Place, which saw them reunite with producer Jack Douglas. However, after the first song for the album, "Lightning Strikes", was recorded, Brad Whitford left the band and formed a duo with Derek St. Holmes, with whom he recorded a self-titled album, which failed to garner much interest. Whitford later joined up with the Joe Perry Project and played with them in 1984.

With Rick Dufay taking Whitford's place, Rock in a Hard Place was released on August 27, 1982. The album reached number 32 on the Billboard 200 album chart. Only one single charted, the aforementioned "Lightning Strikes", which peaked at number 21 on the Billboard Mainstream Rock chart. As with the tour for Night in the Ruts, Aerosmith was unable to book larger venues, and instead had to rely on filling clubs and theaters, which they struggled to do. At a homecoming arena show in Worcester, Massachusetts, Tyler and Perry reunited and got high backstage before the show. Tyler was so intoxicated that he collapsed on stage again and, like before, could not get up.

On February 14, 1984, Perry (by then divorced from his first wife Elissa) and Whitford saw Aerosmith perform at Boston's Orpheum Theater. Shortly thereafter, discussions began to reintegrate the two into the band and several months later, the original members of Aerosmith officially reunited. Steven Tyler recalls:

You should have felt the buzz the moment all five of us got together in the same room for the first time again. We all started laughin'—it was like the five years had never passed. We knew we'd made the right move.

— Steven Tyler

=== Back in the Saddle reunion tour, Done with Mirrors, and drug rehab (1984–1986) ===
In 1984, Aerosmith embarked on a reunion tour called the Back in the Saddle Tour, which led to the live album Classics Live II. While concerts on the tour were well-attended, it was plagued with several incidents, mostly attributed to drug abuse by band members. With their drug problems still not behind them, the group was signed to Geffen Records, and began working on a comeback. Despite the band signing on to a new record company, the band's old label Columbia continued to reap the benefits of Aerosmith's comeback, releasing the live companion albums Classics Live I and II and the collection Gems.

In 1985, the band released the album Done with Mirrors, their first studio album since reuniting. While the album did receive some positive reviews, it only went gold and failed to produce a hit single or generate any widespread interest. The album's most notable track, "Let the Music Do the Talking", was in fact a cover of a song originally recorded by the Joe Perry Project and released on that band's album of the same name. Nevertheless, the band became a popular concert attraction once again, touring in support of Done with Mirrors, well into 1986. In 1986, in an unprecedented crossover collaboration, Aerosmith (largely the additional contributions of leaders Tyler and Perry) appeared on Run–D.M.C.'s cover of "Walk This Way", a track blending rock and roll with hip hop. In reaching number 4 on the Billboard Hot 100, the song and its frequently-aired video resurrected Aerosmith's career by introducing the band's music to a new generation.

Despite their resurrecting performance, the band members' drug problems still stood in their way. In 1986, Tyler completed a successful drug rehabilitation program, after an intervention by his fellow band members, a doctor, and manager Tim Collins, who believed that the band's future would not be bright if Tyler did not get treated in time. The rest of the band members also completed drug rehab programs over the course of the next couple of years. According to the band's tell-all autobiography, Collins pledged in September 1986 that he could make Aerosmith the biggest band in the world by 1990 if they all completed drug rehab. Their next album was crucial because of the commercial disappointment of Done With Mirrors, and as the band members became clean, they worked hard to make their next album a success.

=== Permanent Vacation and Pump (1987–1991) ===
Permanent Vacation was released in August 1987, becoming a major hit and the band's bestselling album in over a decade (selling 5 million copies in the US), with all three of its singles ("Dude (Looks Like a Lady)", "Angel", and "Rag Doll") reaching the Top 20 of the Billboard Hot 100. Steven Tyler reveals in his autobiography that the album was "...the first one we ever did sober." Part of Permanent Vacation's commercial success involved producer Bruce Fairbairn whose production touches (such as sound effects and high-quality recording) added interest to the album and the use of outside songwriters such as Desmond Child, Jim Vallance, and Holly Knight who assisted the band with lyrics. While the group was initially hesitant to using outside songwriters, including Tyler being furious for Knight getting songwriting credits for changing one word ("Rag Time" became "Rag Doll"), the method paid off, as Permanent Vacation became the band's most successful album in a decade. The group went on a subsequent tour with labelmates Guns N' Roses (who have cited Aerosmith as a major influence), which was intense at times because of Aerosmith's new struggle to stay clean amidst Guns N' Roses' well-publicized, rampant drug use.

"Janie's Got a Gun"
Sample of "Janie's Got a Gun" by Aerosmith, from Pump (1989)

Aerosmith's next album was even more successful. Pump, released in September 1989, featured three top-ten singles: "Love in an Elevator", "Janie's Got a Gun", and "What It Takes", as well as the top 30 "The Other Side", re-establishing the band as a serious musical force. Pump was a critical and commercial success, eventually selling 7 million copies, spawning several music videos that were in regular rotation on MTV, and achieving four-star ratings from major music magazines. Pump ranked as the fourth-bestselling album of 1990. The band also won its first Grammy in the category of Best Rock Performance by a Duo or Group with Vocal, for "Janie's Got a Gun". In addition, the video for "Janie's Got a Gun" won two Video Music Awards and was ranked as one of the 100 greatest videos of all time by Rolling Stone, MTV, and VH1. Like Permanent Vacation, Pump was produced by Bruce Fairbairn, who added production touches such as instrumental interludes that provided transitions between songs to give the album a more complete sound, as well as the Margarita Horns, who added horns to tracks such as "Love in an Elevator" and "The Other Side". Rock critic Stephen Thomas Erlewine claimed that Pump "revels in [pop concessions] without ever losing sight of Aerosmith's dirty hard rock core", going on to say that, "such ambition and successful musical eclectism make Pump rank with Toys in the Attic and Rocks." The recording process for Pump was documented in the video The Making of Pump, which has since been re-released as a DVD. The music videos for the album's singles were featured on the release Things That Go Pump in the Night, which quickly went platinum.

Aerosmith appear in a "Wayne's World" sketch on Saturday Night Live in 1990

In support of Pump, the band embarked on the 12-month Pump Tour, which lasted for most of 1990. On February 21, 1990, the band appeared in a "Wayne's World" sketch on Saturday Night Live, debating the fall of communism and the Soviet Union, and performed their recent hits "Janie's Got a Gun" and "Monkey on My Back". The appearance of the band in the "Wayne's World" sketch was later ranked by E! as the number-one moment in the history of the program. On August 11, 1990, the band's performance on MTV's Unplugged aired. In October 1990, the Pump Tour ended, with the band's first ever performances in Australia. That same year, the band was also inducted to the Hollywood Rock Walk. In November 1991, the band appeared on The Simpsons episode "Flaming Moe's" and released a box set titled Pandora's Box. In coordination with the release of Pandora's Box, the band's 1975 hit "Sweet Emotion" was re-mixed and re-released as a single, and a music video was created to promote the single. Also in 1991, the band performed their 1973 single "Dream On" with Michael Kamen's orchestra for MTV's 10th Anniversary special; this performance was used as the official music video for the song. In 1992, Tyler and Perry appeared live as guests of Guns N' Roses during the latter's 1992 worldwide pay-per-view show in Paris, performing a medley of "Mama Kin" (which GN'R covered in 1986) and "Train Kept-A Rollin".

=== Get a Grip and Big Ones (1992–1995) ===
The band took a brief break before recording their follow-up to Pump in 1992. Despite significant shifts in mainstream music at the beginning of the 1990s, 1993's Get a Grip was just as successful commercially, becoming their first album to debut at number 1 and racking up sales of 7 million copies in a two-and-a-half-year timespan and over 20 million copies worldwide. The first singles were the hard rocking "Livin' on the Edge" and "Eat the Rich". Though many critics were unimpressed by the focus on the subsequent interchangeable power-ballads in promoting the album, all three ("Cryin'", "Amazing", and "Crazy") proved to be huge successes on radio and MTV. The music videos featured then up-and-coming actress Alicia Silverstone; her provocative performances earned her the title of "the Aerosmith chick" for the first half of the decade. Steven Tyler's daughter Liv Tyler was also featured in the "Crazy" video. The band won two Grammy Awards for songs from this album in the category of Best Rock Performance by a Duo or Group with Vocal: for "Livin' on the Edge" in 1994 and "Crazy" in 1995.

During the making of Get a Grip, the management and record company brought in a variety of professional songwriting collaborators to help give nearly all the songs on the album more commercial appeal, a trend which would continue until the early 2000s. However, this led to accusations of selling out that would continue throughout the 1990s. In addition to Aerosmith's grueling 18-month world tour in support of Get a Grip, the band also did a number of things to help promote themselves and their album and appeal to youth culture, including the appearance of the band in the movie Wayne's World 2 where they performed two songs, the appearance of the band and their music in the video games Revolution X and Quest for Fame, performing at Woodstock '94, using their song "Deuces Are Wild" in The Beavis and Butt-head Experience, and opening their own club, The Mama Kin Music Hall, in Boston in 1994. That same year saw the release of the band's compilation for Geffen Records, entitled Big Ones featuring their biggest hits from Permanent Vacation, Pump, and Get a Grip, "Deuces Are Wild" from the Beavis and Butt-head Experience, as well as two new songs, "Blind Man" and "Walk on Water", both of which experienced great success on the rock charts.

=== Nine Lives and "I Don't Want to Miss a Thing" (1996–2000) ===
"I Don't Want to Miss a Thing"
Sample of "I Don't Want to Miss a Thing" by Aerosmith, from Armageddon (1998)

Aerosmith had signed a $30 million contract for four records with Columbia Records/Sony Music in 1991, but had only recorded three of their six contractual albums with Geffen Records at that point (Done with Mirrors, Permanent Vacation, and Pump). Between 1991 and 1996, they released two more albums with Geffen (Get a Grip and Big Ones), which meant they now had five albums with Geffen under their belt (along with a planned live compilation), which meant they could now begin recording for their new contract with Columbia. The band took time off with their families before working on their next album, Nine Lives, which was plagued with personnel problems, including the firing of manager Tim Collins, who, according to band members, had nearly caused the band to break up. The album's producer was also changed from Glen Ballard to Kevin Shirley. Nine Lives was released in March 1997. Reviews were mixed, and Nine Lives initially fell down the charts, although it had a long chart life and sold double platinum in the United States alone, fueled by its singles, "Falling in Love (Is Hard on the Knees)", the ballad "Hole in My Soul", and the crossover-pop smash "Pink" (which won the band their fourth Grammy Award in 1999 in the Best Rock Performance by a Duo or Group with Vocal category). It was followed by the over two-year-long Nine Lives Tour, which was plagued by problems including lead singer Steven Tyler injuring his leg at a concert, and Joey Kramer suffering second degree burns when his car caught fire at a gas station.

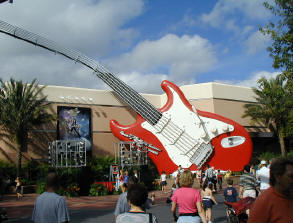
The Rock 'n' Roller Coaster Starring Aerosmith opened on July 29, 1999, in Disney's Hollywood Studios in Walt Disney World Resort

In 1998, in the midst of setbacks during the Nine Lives Tour, the band released the single "I Don't Want to Miss a Thing", the love theme, written by Diane Warren for the 1998 film Armageddon, starring Steven Tyler's daughter Liv. The song became Aerosmith's first and only number 1 single when it debuted at the top position on the Billboard Hot 100 and stayed on top of the charts for four weeks. The song was nominated for an Academy Award in 1999. The song helped open Aerosmith up to a new generation and remains a slow-dance staple. 1998 also saw the release of the double-live album, A Little South of Sanity, which was assembled from performances on the Get a Grip and Nine Lives tours. The album went platinum shortly after its release. The band continued with their seemingly neverending world tours promoting Nine Lives and the "I Don't Want to Miss a Thing" single well into 1999.

In 1999, Aerosmith was chosen to be featured in the Rock 'n' Roller Coaster Starring Aerosmith, providing the ride's soundtrack and theme at both Disney's Hollywood Studios at the Walt Disney World Resort and, formerly, at Disneyland Paris in the Walt Disney Studios Park, which opened in 2002 and closed in 2019, to be replaced by an Iron Man and the Avengers attraction in the upcoming Avengers Campus. On September 9, 1999, Steven Tyler and Joe Perry reunited with Run–D.M.C. and were also joined by Kid Rock for a collaborative live performance of "Walk This Way" at the MTV Video Music Awards, a precursor to the Girls of Summer Tour. The band celebrated the new millennium with a brief tour of Japan, and also contributed the song "Angel's Eye" to the 2000 film Charlie's Angels. In December 2000, they wrapped up work on their next album.

=== Just Push Play, O, Yeah! and Rocksimus Maximus (2001–2003) ===
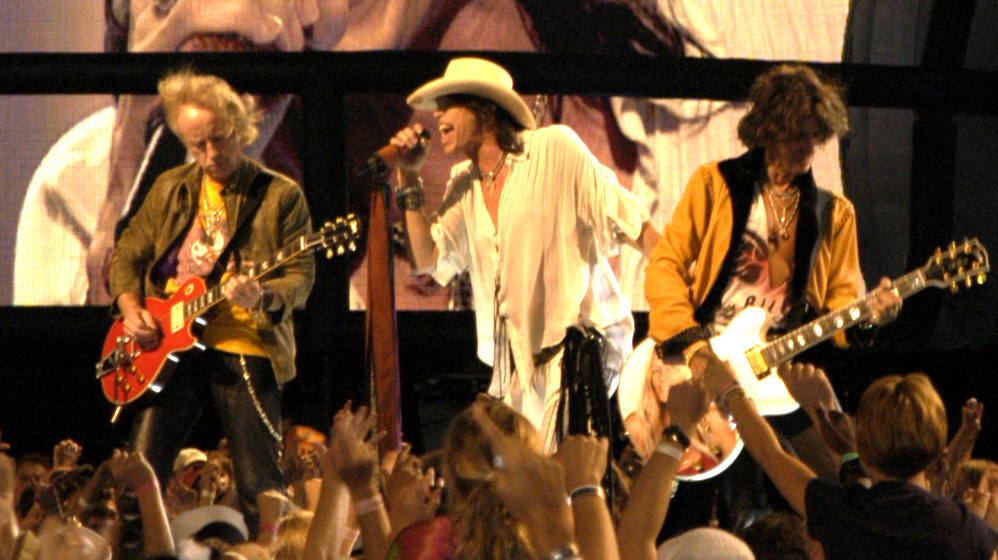
Brad Whitford, Steven Tyler, and Joe Perry of Aerosmith performing at the NFL Kickoff in Washington, D.C., on September 4, 2003

The band entered their next decade by co-headlining with NSYNC the Super Bowl XXXV halftime show, titled "The Kings of Rock and Pop", with appearances from Britney Spears, Mary J. Blige and Nelly. All of the stars collaborated with Aerosmith at the end for a performance of "Walk This Way".

In March 2001, the band released their 13th studio album Just Push Play, which quickly went platinum, fueled by the Top 10 single "Jaded" and the appearance of the title track in Dodge commercials. They were inducted to the Rock and Roll Hall of Fame soon after their album was released, in late March 2001. Aerosmith is the only band to be inducted to the Hall of Fame with a song active in the charts ("Jaded"). Later that year, the band performed as part of the United We Stand: What More Can I Give benefit concert in Washington D.C. for 9/11 victims and their families. The band flew back to Indianapolis for a show the same night, as part of their Just Push Play Tour.

The band started 2002 by ending the Just Push Play tour, and simultaneously recording segments for their Behind the Music special on VH1, which not only chronicled the band's history but also the band's current activities and touring. The special was one of the few Behind the Musics to run two hours in length. In May, Aerosmith covered the "Theme from Spider-Man" for the soundtrack of the 2002 film of the same name. On June 27, the band performed at the official FIFA World Cup concert at Tokyo Stadium which took place during the 2002 FIFA World Cup held in Korea/Japan. In July 2002, Aerosmith released a two-disc career-spanning compilation O, Yeah! Ultimate Aerosmith Hits, which featured the new single "Girls of Summer" and embarked on the Girls of Summer Tour with Kid Rock and Run–D.M.C. opening. O, Yeah! has since been certified double platinum. MTV honored Aerosmith with their mtvICON award in 2002. Performances included Pink covering "Janie's Got a Gun". Shakira performed "Dude (Looks Like a Lady)", Kid Rock played "Mama Kin" and "Last Child", Train performed "Dream On" and Papa Roach covered "Sweet Emotion". In addition, testimonials featured surprise guests Metallica, as well as Janet Jackson, Limp Bizkit singer Fred Durst, Alicia Silverstone and Mila Kunis.

In 2003, Aerosmith co-headlined with Kiss on the Rocksimus Maximus Tour, in preparation for release of their blues album. They also performed a song for Rugrats Go Wild, "Lizard Love".

=== Honkin' on Bobo, Rockin' the Joint and Devil's Got a New Disguise (2004–2006) ===
Aerosmith's long-promised blues album Honkin' on Bobo was released in 2004. This was a return to the band's roots, including recording the album in live sessions, working with former producer Jack Douglas, and laying down their blues rock grit. It was followed by a live DVD, You Gotta Move, in December 2004, culled from performances on the Honkin' on Bobo Tour. "Dream On" was also featured in an advertising campaign for Buick in 2004, targeting that marque's market which is now composed largely of people who were teenagers when the song first charted.

2005 saw Steven Tyler appear in the film Be Cool. Joe Perry released his self-titled solo album that same year. At the 2006 Grammy Awards, he was nominated for Best Rock Instrumental Performance for the track "Mercy", but lost to Les Paul. In October 2005, Aerosmith released a CD/DVD Rockin' the Joint. The band hit the road for the Rockin' the Joint Tour on October 30 with Lenny Kravitz for a fall/winter tour of arenas in the largest US markets. The band planned to tour with Cheap Trick in the spring, hitting secondary markets in the US. Almost all of this leg of the tour was canceled, however. Dates were initially canceled one by one until March 22, 2006, when it was announced that lead singer Steven Tyler needed throat surgery, and the remaining dates on the tour were subsequently canceled.

Tyler and Perry performed with the Boston Pops Orchestra for their annual concert of July 4 on the Esplanade in 2006, a milestone as it was the first major event or performance since Steven Tyler's throat surgery. Around this time, the band also announced that they would embark on the Route of All Evil Tour with Mötley Crüe in late 2006. On August 24, 2006, it was announced that Tom Hamilton was undergoing treatment for throat cancer. In order to make a full recovery, he sat out much of the Route of All Evil Tour until he was well again. Former Joe Perry Project bassist David Hull substituted for Hamilton until his return. On September 5, 2006, Aerosmith kicked off the Route of All Evil Tour with Mötley Crüe in Columbus, Ohio. The co-headlining tour took both bands to amphitheaters across North America through November 24, 2006. After that, a select few arena dates were added, some of which were with Mötley Crüe. The tour ended December 17, 2006.

On October 17, 2006, the compilation album Devil's Got a New Disguise: The Very Best of Aerosmith was released. The album contained previous hits with the addition of two new songs, "Devil's Got a New Disguise" and "Sedona Sunrise", which were older outtakes re-recorded for the album. "Devil's Got a New Disguise" peaked at number 15 on the Mainstream Rock Tracks chart. The album was intended to fulfill Aerosmith's contract with Sony and tide fans over until the band's new studio album was released.

=== Touring, Guitar Hero: Aerosmith and unfinished album (2007–2009) ===
In early 2007, the band announced a new World Tour, their first for nearly a decade to include dates outside North America or Japan. The band performed at London's Hard Rock Cafe in February 2007 to promote their European tour which included a night in Hyde Park as part of the Hyde Park Calling festival sponsored by Hard Rock Cafe. In the spring, the band toured Latin America to sold-out stadium crowds. In the summer, the band toured Europe, performing at several major rock festivals and visiting some countries they had never played before. Additionally, the band played in Middle East countries such as the United Arab Emirates and India for the first time. The band also played a few select dates in California and Canada in late July. The July 21, 2007 concert in Prince Edward Island, was the largest in that province's history. In September, the band performed eight dates in major markets in Northeastern North America. These shows were opened by Joan Jett. The band also played a private gig in Hawaii. A public show in Maui was canceled for logistical reasons, which spurred a class action lawsuit against the band. In April 2009, Aerosmith agreed to compensate all ticket buyers of the canceled show with a free ticket to a rescheduled Maui show to be held on October 20, 2009, along with reimbursements of all out-of-pocket expenses related to the show.

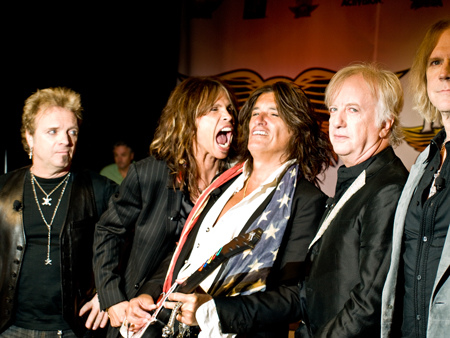
Aerosmith promoting Guitar Hero: Aerosmith in 2008

On November 1, 2007, the band entered the studio to work on the final studio album of their current contract with Sony. At the time, it was believed that the album would include both re-recorded tracks left off previous albums as well as brand new material. In an interview, guitarist Joe Perry revealed that in addition to creating a new album, the band was working closely with the makers of the Guitar Hero series to develop Guitar Hero: Aerosmith, a video game dedicated to the band's music. The game was released on June 29, 2008, and contains many of their most popular songs. Steven Tyler announced on VH1 Classic Radio on September 4, 2008, that Aerosmith intended to enter the studio at the end of September 2008 to complete the band's 15th studio album. Tyler also confirmed that the band planned to begin a new US tour in June 2009, in support of the as-yet-untitled album. This tour was supposed to be preceded by a concert in Venezuela on February 1, 2009. However, on January 15, 2009, Tyler said the band would be unable to play the gig because of a second knee injury of guitarist Joe Perry. In mid-February 2009, it was announced that the album would be produced by the famed Brendan O'Brien and that the album would likely be recorded live, like their earlier records. Although the band had hoped to finish the album before the tour started in June 2009, Perry said that the group "realized there wasn't any chance of getting [the album] finished before we hit the road for the summer." The tour featured ZZ Top as the opening act for most of the tour. The Aerosmith/ZZ Top Tour, presented by Guitar Hero: Aerosmith, was officially announced and the first dates released on April 8, 2009.

The tour was slated to take the band across North America from June to September 2009. The tour featured the band performing nearly all of the songs on their 1975 album Toys in the Attic during the first seven dates of the tour and also featured Joe Perry sing lead vocals on the 1976 "Combination". The tour was plagued with several health problems, however. Guitarist Brad Whitford had to sit out the first seven dates of the tour in order to recover from head surgery, after injuring his head getting out of his car. On June 28, 2009, at the band's seventh show of the tour at the Mohegan Sun Arena in Uncasville, Connecticut, lead singer Steven Tyler injured his leg, which required seven shows to be postponed. As soon as the band resumed the tour on July 15, Whitford returned to the fold. However, Tom Hamilton had to depart the tour in order to recover from non-invasive surgery. On August 5, 2009, Tyler was rushed to the hospital after falling from the stage at a concert in Sturgis, South Dakota. He was helped up by security staff and taken backstage, before guitarist Joe Perry told the audience the show was over. Tyler was airlifted to Rapid City Regional Hospital, where he received treatment for head and neck injuries and a broken shoulder. In the wake of Tyler's injuries, the band was forced to postpone five shows in Western Canada. On August 14, 2009, Aerosmith announced that they had decided to cancel the rest of their US tour dates with ZZ Top, due to Tyler's injuries.

In the midst of the tour, Perry completed work on his fifth solo album, Have Guitar, Will Travel and drummer Joey Kramer released his autobiography, Hit Hard. Perry's solo album was released on October 6, 2009.

After Tyler recovered from falling off stage, the band returned to the stage in mid-October for two shows in Hawaii, one in Maui which was rescheduled from 2007 and finally played as part of a legal settlement, and an additional show which was played in Honolulu. In early November, the band played a concert in Abu Dhabi at the Grand Prix.

=== Tyler-Perry feud and Cocked, Locked, and Ready to Rock Tour (2009–2010) ===
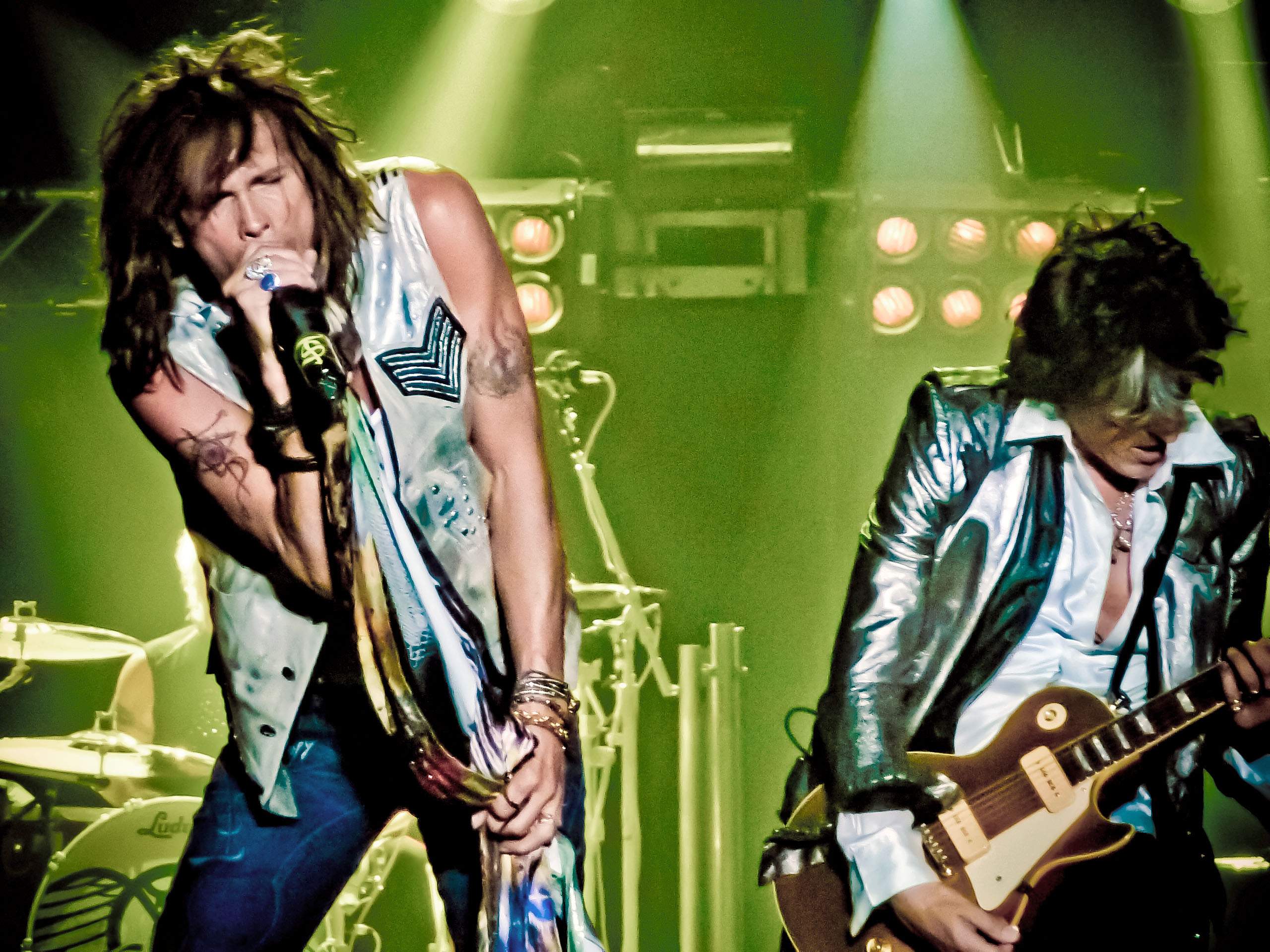
Aerosmith performing in Arnhem, Netherlands, on June 23, 2010

Tyler pulled out of a planned South American tour at the end of 2009 and seemed intent on pursuing solo projects, including his autobiography Does the Noise in My Head Bother You?. Tyler told Classic Rock magazine, "I don't know what I'm doing yet, but it's definitely going to be something Steven Tyler: working on the brand of myself – Brand Tyler." Meanwhile, guitarist Joe Perry toured the United States at the end of 2009, and Japan and the UK early in 2010.

In November 2009, Joe Perry stated that Tyler had not been in contact with the band and could be on the verge of quitting Aerosmith. Perry stated that the rest of the group was "looking for a new singer to work with". It was reported that singer Lenny Kravitz had been approached for Steven Tyler's position, which he then declined.

However, despite the rumors of him leaving the band, Tyler joined the Joe Perry Project onstage on November 10, 2009, at the Fillmore New York at Irving Plaza, and Tyler and Perry performed the Aerosmith single "Walk This Way" together. According to sources at the event, Tyler assured the crowd that he was "not quitting Aerosmith".

On December 22, 2009, People magazine reported that Tyler had entered a rehabilitation facility to manage his addiction to painkillers, brought on by injuries to his knees, legs, and feet, that resulted from years of performing. In his statement, Tyler said he is grateful for the support he is receiving, is committed to getting things taken care of, and is eager to get back on stage and in the recording studio with his bandmates.

On January 20, 2010, Perry confirmed the band were about to audition for a new singer to replace Tyler. Perry said Tyler's surgery to his legs would "take him out of the picture" for up to a year and a half, and in the meantime, the rest of the band wanted to continue performing. Perry also said that the band would be willing to continue working with Tyler in the future if the singer wanted to.

In response, Tyler's attorney sent the band and its manager a "cease and desist" letter and threatened further legal action against both if the band did not discontinue this effort to replace Tyler.

On February 15, 2010, it was announced that Aerosmith were to headline Download Festival at Donington Park, England in June 2010. Tyler was confirmed as the frontman for the show by festival promoter Andy Copping. It was announced that the band would precede the June 13, 2010 date with an appearance at the Sweden Rock Festival on June 10, 2010, in Sölvesborg. During the Donington show, Perry celebrated Tyler's position as frontman, dubbing him "the best lead singer on the planet". On February 24, the band announced the first batch of dates for their upcoming Cocked, Locked, Ready to Rock Tour. The tour saw the band play seven dates in South and Central America in May, followed by eleven dates in Europe, in June and early July. The band performed in Colombia, Peru and Greece for the first time in their career on this tour. The band performed 24 concerts in North America in late July, August, and September. Many of the concerts were in locations the band canceled on in 2009. As part of the tour, the band played Fenway Park in Boston with fellow Bostonians the J. Geils Band.

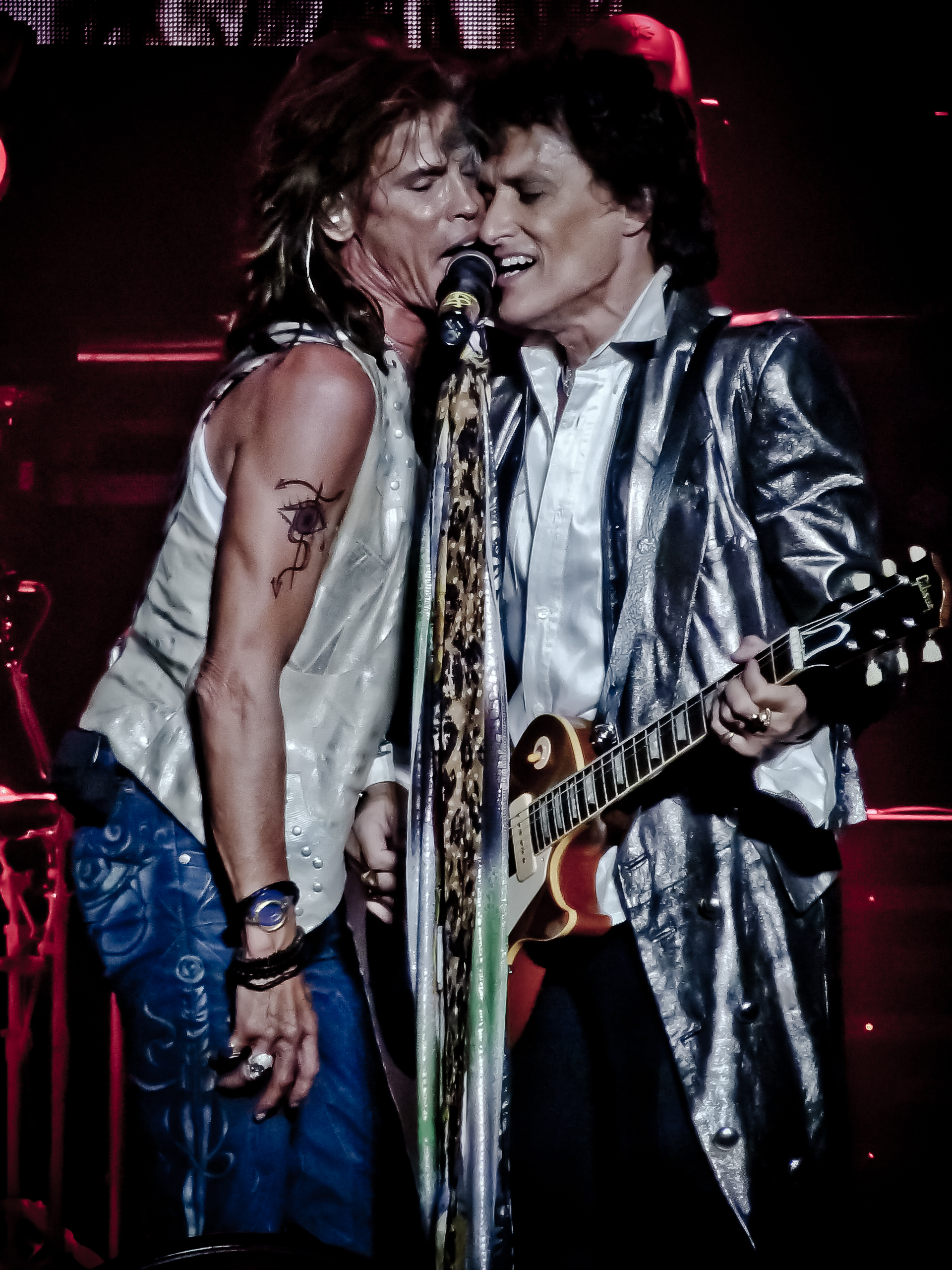
In 2010, tensions flared between Tyler (left) and Perry (right) after the former accepted an offer to be a judge on American Idol

Problems on the band's Cocked, Locked, and Ready to Rock Tour arose in August 2010, including Tyler accidentally hitting Joe Perry in the head with his microphone stand at a show in Wantagh, New York and Perry bumping into Tyler at the Toronto show, which caused Tyler to tumble off the stage. Perry suffered a minor head injury at the Wantagh show and Tyler was helped back up by fans and Perry at the Toronto show, and both shows went on. Around the same time as these incidents, tension flared again between Perry and Tyler due to Tyler's plans to become a talent judge on American Idol. Perry criticized Tyler for not consulting the rest of the band, saying that he "found out on the internet, like the rest of the world" and that nobody else in the band knew anything about it.

On August 18, 2010, it was reported that Tyler officially signed on with the show. When asked about this in October, Perry declared he understood Tyler's reasons and wished him luck, but stated that he would seek different projects – "I'm tired of waiting around, so I'm not passing up anything right now".

While announcing the Cocked, Locked, and Ready to Rock Tour in 2009, Tyler and Perry said that the next item on the agenda was a new Aerosmith album, the group's first since 2004's Honkin' on Bobo. The group did some recording with producer Brendan O'Brien in 2008 but halted because of Tyler's health problems. Aerosmith bassist Tom Hamilton told the Boston Herald in September 2010 that Tyler believes he has the time and energy to continue fronting the band while also being a judge on American Idol.

Hamilton explained, "Steven's been very emphatic in saying that the way his time is arranged on the show leaves room to work on a record. He's been taking great pains to remind everybody of that, so hopefully that's the way it will come out." On November 5, 2010, Brad Whitford said the recording sessions will probably be in Los Angeles, where American Idol is headquartered, and a world tour would follow.

=== Touring and Music from Another Dimension! (2010–2013) ===
In a November 2010 interview reported at NME.com, drummer Joey Kramer confirmed that the band had every intention to finish and release their long-delayed album in 2011, stating, "Really, at this point in time, the only thing that's going to stop us is if someone out-and-out dies. Other than that, we've already been through what we've been through and stood the test of time. What else is there?" On January 18, 2011, Tyler declared that "Joe (Perry) has got some licks and I've got a bunch of songs that I've written for solo and/or Aerosmith" and the band would start prepping the album that week. On March 20, 2011, Aerosmith announced a new greatest hits album, Tough Love: Best of the Ballads, which was released on May 10, 2011. On May 14, 2011, the band announced a tour of Latin America in the fall of 2011. In June, Joe Perry announced that the band is going to meet at the recording studio to produce the next album of the band in July. On August 30, 2011, it was announced that the new album will be released around May 2012. The album will be produced by Jack Douglas, who produced four albums for the band in the 1970s. Aerosmith began their fall tour of Latin America and Japan on October 22, 2011, in Lima, Peru. As part of the tour, the band performed in Paraguay, Panama, and Ecuador for the first time in their careers. Their show in Asunción, Paraguay was postponed a day, after lead singer Steven Tyler sustained facial injuries after falling in his hotel room shower, due to a bout of food poisoning that dehydrated him and caused him to faint.

Steven Tyler and Joey Kramer playing drums together at an Aerosmith concert in Chicago, Illinois, on June 22, 2012

On March 11, 2012, Aerosmith was featured on an episode of 60 Minutes. The show included very candid interviews with the band members, interspersed with live performances from the band's 2011 tour. Some of the comments the band members said about each other seemed to re-ignite past tensions in the band. However, on March 22, 2012, Joe Perry surprised Steven Tyler by performing "Happy Birthday" for him on American Idol, as an early birthday present for Tyler. On March 26, 2012, Aerosmith announced a summer tour with Cheap Trick entitled the "Global Warming Tour". On May 23, 2012, Aerosmith debuted their new single, "Legendary Child", on the season finale of American Idol. Shortly after, it was announced that their fifteenth studio album, Music from Another Dimension!, would be released on November 6, 2012. On May 30, 2012, Aerosmith and Cheap Trick performed for Walmart shareholders. Aerosmith's Global Warming Tour began June 16, 2012 in Minneapolis and took the band to 26 locations across North America through August 12, 2012. The band hinted that the tour would continue in October/November after the album release. On August 22, 2012, Aerosmith released two singles simultaneously, the rocker "Lover Alot" and the ballad "What Could Have Been Love". On September 22, 2012, Aerosmith performed at the iHeartRadio music festival in Las Vegas. In advance of the release of their new album, the band performed on The Late Show with David Letterman and Today, and Tyler and Perry were interviewed on The Late Show and The View. In addition, Tyler, Perry and Whitford performed "Dream On" for the telethon Hurricane Sandy: Coming Together to raise funds for the victims of the namesake storm that struck the Northeastern United States. On November 5, 2012, Aerosmith performed an outdoor concert in front of their old apartment at 1325 Commonwealth Avenue in Boston to celebrate the release of their album and their Boston roots. Music from Another Dimension! was released on November 6, 2012. Two days later, the band began the 2nd leg of their Global Warming Tour, which took the band to 14 North American locations through December 13, 2012.

On January 21, 2013, Aerosmith released "Can't Stop Lovin' You" (featuring Carrie Underwood) as the fourth single from Music from Another Dimension!. On February 20, 2013, it was announced that the band's principal songwriters Steven Tyler and Joe Perry would be recipients of the ASCAP Founders Award at the society's 30th Annual Pop Music Awards on April 17, 2013. Two days later, it was announced that the duo would be inducted into the Songwriters Hall of Fame at a ceremony to be held on June 13, 2013.

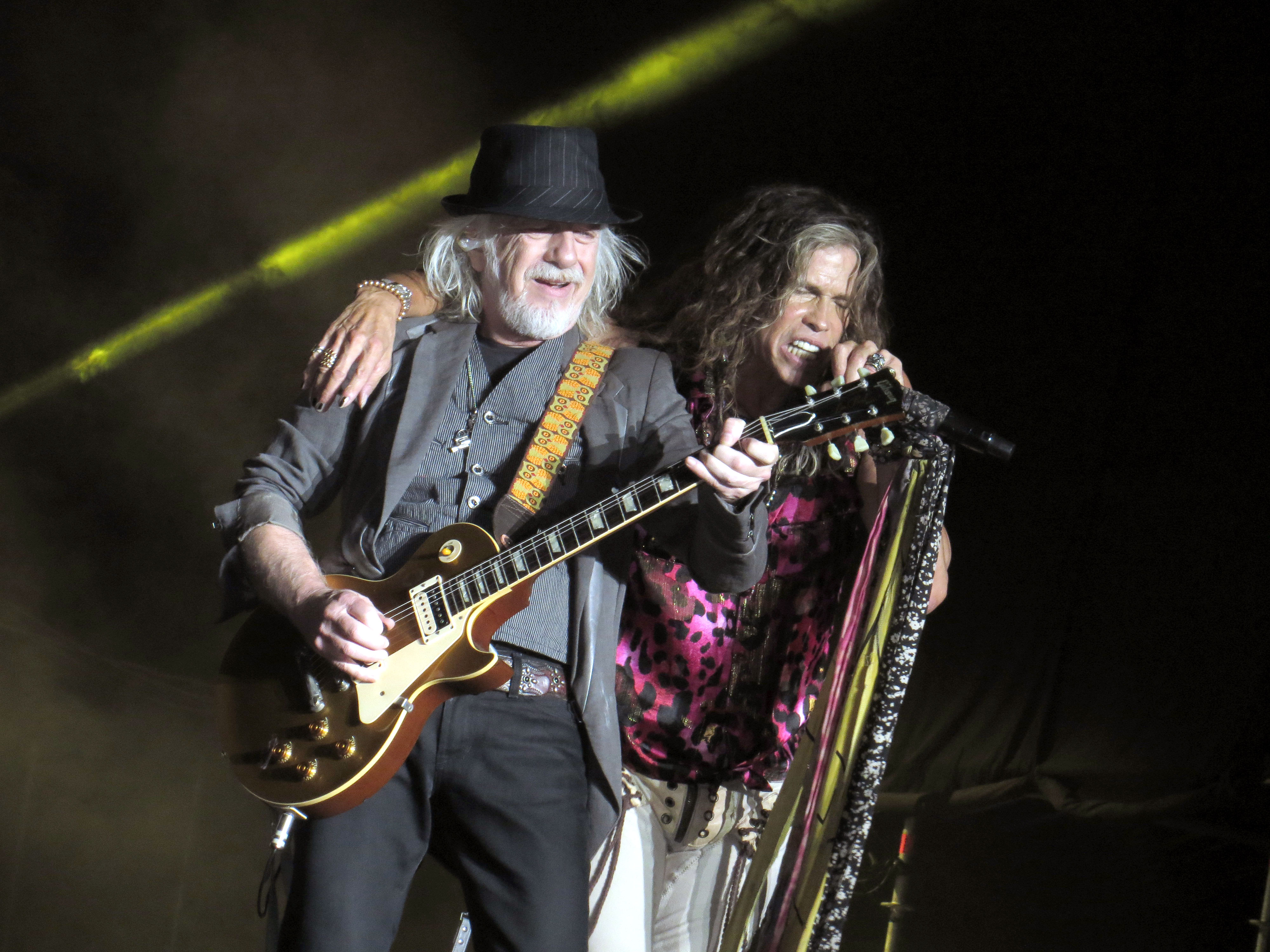
Brad Whitford (left) and Steven Tyler (right) performing with Aerosmith in Caracas, 2013

In late April 2013 and early May 2013, Aerosmith extended their Global Warming Tour to Australia, New Zealand, the Philippines, Indonesia, and Singapore. This marked the band's first performances in Australia in 23 years, and the band's first-ever performances in the latter four countries. Tom Hamilton had to miss the last three Australian shows due to illness, David Hull filled in for him. On May 5, 2013, Aerosmith cancelled their first-ever performance in Indonesia (scheduled for May 11, 2013) due to safety concerns, the actual threat was not released. On May 30, 2013, Aerosmith performed as part of the "Boston Strong" charity concert for victims of the Boston Marathon bombing. The band also performed at the Greenbrier Classic in West Virginia on July 6, 2013 at the Foxwoods Resort Casino in Connecticut on July 10, 2013, four concerts in Japan in mid-August, and as part of the Harley-Davidson 110th Anniversary Concert series in Milwaukee on August 30, 2013. In the fall of 2013, Aerosmith extended their tour to Central and South America, including their first-ever performances in Guatemala, El Salvador and Uruguay. Hamilton had to depart the Latin American tour due to illness.

In July 2013, the band released the live concert DVD Rock for the Rising Sun, which also documented the band's 2011 tour of Japan. The release was also screened in select theaters in October 2013.

=== Solo endeavors and continued touring (2014–2018) ===
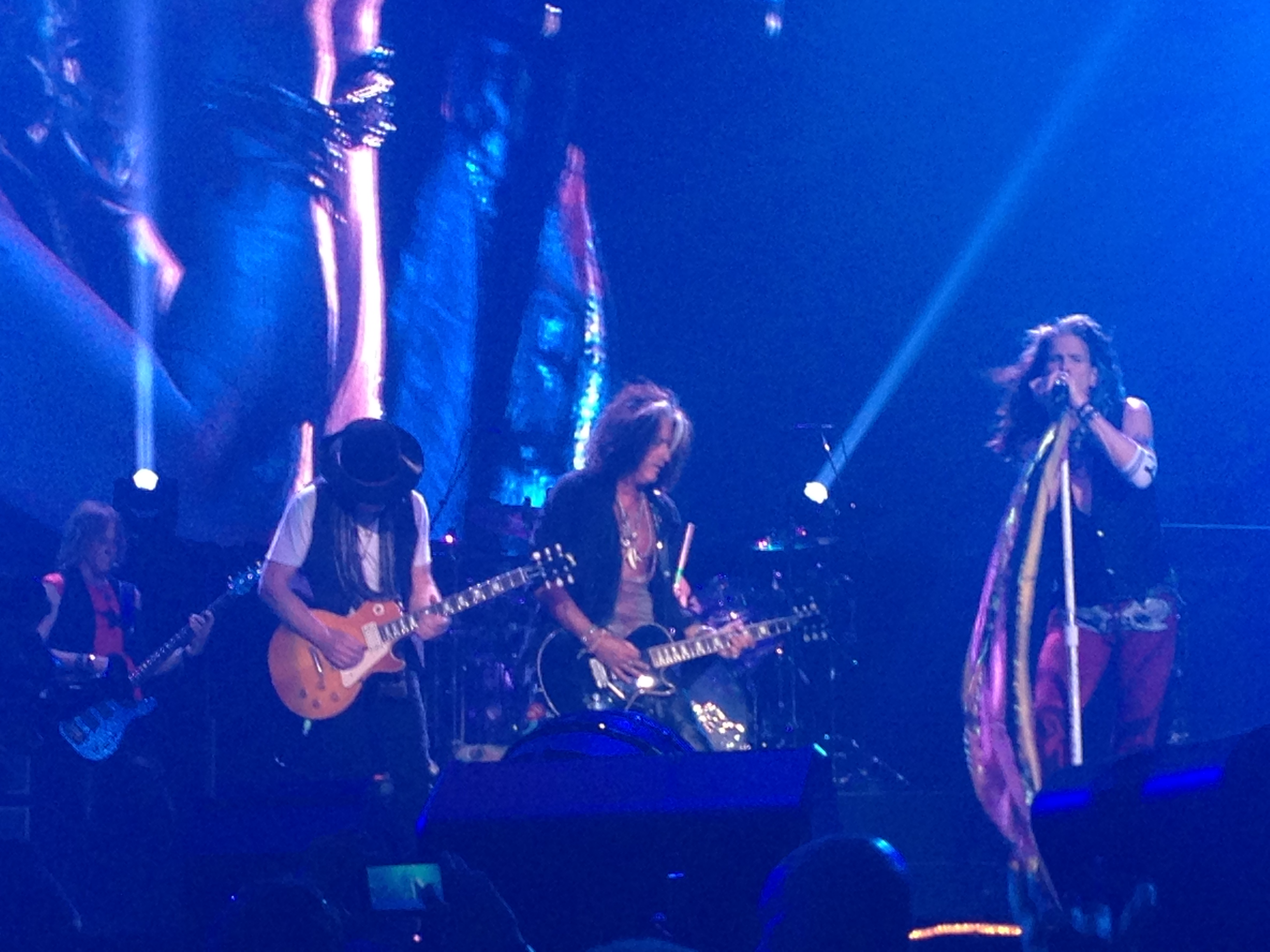
Aerosmith performing on the Blue Army Tour in Grand Rapids, Michigan, on August 4, 2015

On March 21, 2014, in tweets released by Joe Perry, Joey Kramer, and Slash, it was announced that Aerosmith would be touring North America with Slash (along with Myles Kennedy & the Conspirators) in the summer of 2014. This followed a 17-date European tour that Aerosmith took from May 14, 2014, to July 2, 2014. The North American tour, known as the Let Rock Rule Tour, sent Aerosmith to 21 locations from July 10, 2014, to September 12, 2014.

Asked in May 2014 if Aerosmith would release a sixteenth studio album anytime soon, bassist Tom Hamilton replied, "I hope soon. But I really don't know what we are doing because we no longer have a record contract. We are finished with Columbia. So, there is nothing written in stone. We'll see what the fans want." In an interview with Rolling Stone about what the future holds, Joe Perry admitted that, "I don't even know if making new albums makes sense anymore. Maybe we'll just release an EP every six months. I don't know what the future looks like."

On October 7, 2014, Perry released his autobiography Rocks: My Life in and Out of Aerosmith, co-written by David Ritz. Perry promoted the book with a book-signing tour that took him to 14 locations across the United States in the month of October. On February 26, 2015, Aerosmith premiered the film Aerosmith Rocks Donington in 300 movie theaters across North America; the concert video is from the band's 2014 performance at Download Festival at Donington Park in Leicestershire, England. The video was released on DVD/Blu-ray on September 4, 2015.

On March 31, 2015, lead singer Steven Tyler stated that he was working on his first solo country album. On April 6, 2015, it was announced that Tyler signed a record deal with Scott Borchetta's Dot Records (a division of the Big Machine Label Group). On May 13, 2015, Tyler released the lead single, "Love is Your Name", from his forthcoming solo debut album. He promoted the song on the Bobby Bones Show, iHeartMedia, CBS This Morning, Entertainment Tonight, and the American Idol season 14 finale.

On June 10, 2015, Aerosmith embarked on the Blue Army Tour, which sent the band to 17 North American locations through August 7, 2015, many of them in smaller venues in secondary markets that the band has either never performed in or hasn't performed in many years. The band also played a one-off show in Moscow on September 5, 2015. On the tour, the band played several lesser-known deep cuts.

After the tour, Tyler completed work on his solo album, We're All Somebody from Somewhere, which was released on July 15, 2016. Prior to the album's release, a second single, "Red, White & You", was released in January 2016, followed by the third single (the title track) in June 2016. Meanwhile, Joe Perry worked with Alice Cooper and Johnny Depp on the side project Hollywood Vampires, which released their eponymous debut album in September 2015 and performed at the 58th Grammy Awards on February 15, 2016. Brad Whitford re-joined Derek St. Holmes for a handful of tour dates in November 2015 and a new Whitford/St. Holmes album that was made available to fans at their live performances and was scheduled for wide release in 2016. Tom Hamilton performed with Thin Lizzy at a handful of concert dates in Europe in the summer of 2016 and also joined Pearl Jam for a performance of "Draw the Line" at Boston's Fenway Park on August 7, 2015. Meanwhile, Joey Kramer became actively involved in his "Rockin' & Roastin'" coffee business, which opened a location in Newry, Maine, in December 2015 and a second location in North Attleborough, Massachusetts, in July 2016.

Since December 2015, in various interviews, Whitford, Tyler, and Perry all discussed the possibility of a farewell tour or "wind-down tour" slated to start in 2017. Perry has suggested the tour could last for two years and Tyler said it could potentially last "forever", Whitford and Tyler also discussed the potential of doing one last studio album.

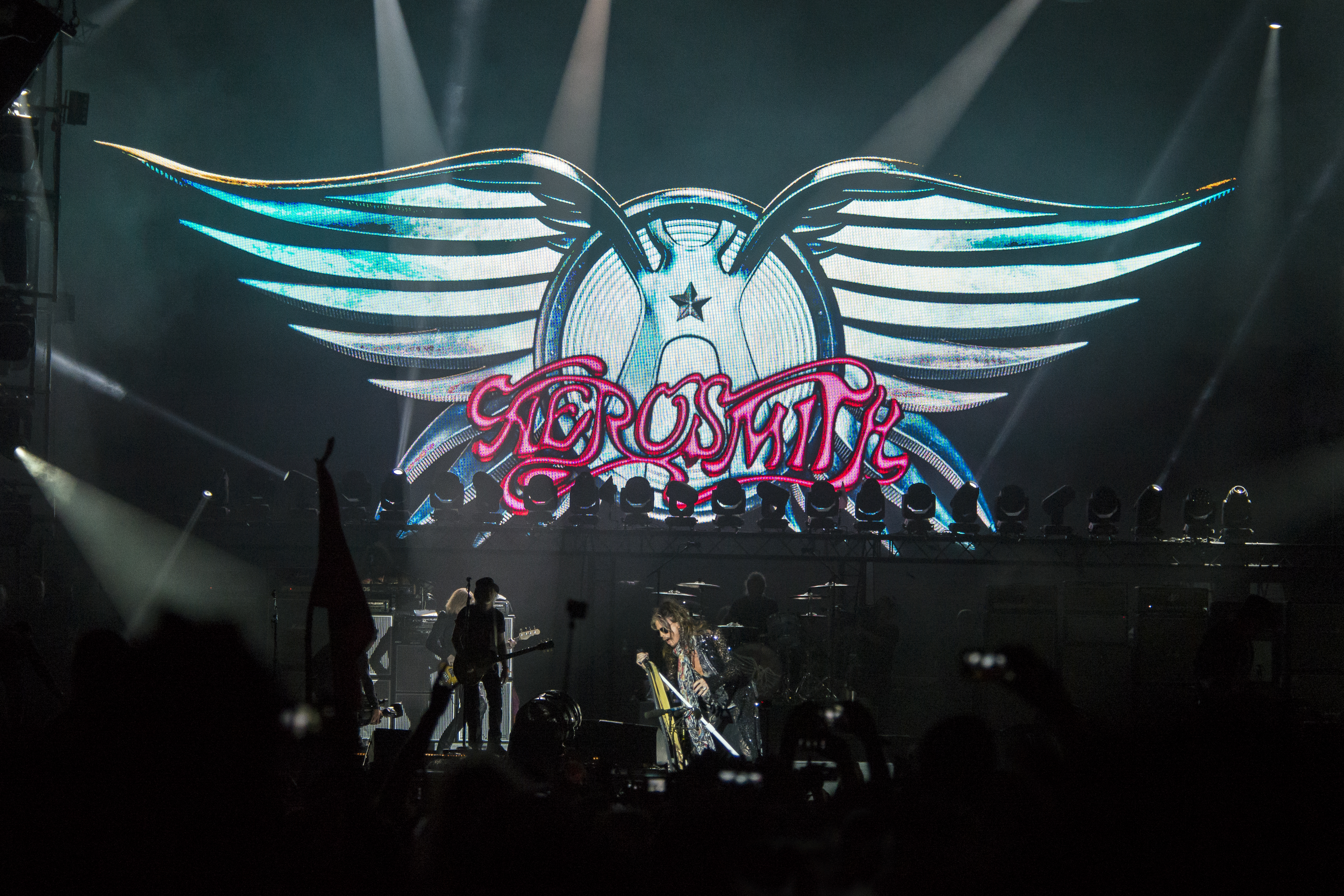
Aerosmith performing at Hellfest 2017

On July 10, 2016, Perry collapsed onstage at a concert he was performing with the Hollywood Vampires on Coney Island in Brooklyn, New York. It is believed he suffered cardiac arrest. He was revived and rushed to the hospital, where he was quickly upgraded to stable condition later that night. The Vampires continued the show without Perry that evening and continued the rest of their tour, but canceled an appearance on The Late Show with Stephen Colbert. After resting for a few days, Perry made a complete recovery and returned to the Hollywood Vampires tour.

From September through October 2016 Aerosmith embarked on a nine-date tour of Latin America, called the Rock 'N' Roll Rumble Tour, preceded by a performance at the Kaaboo Festival in San Diego, California, on September 17. In November 2016, Aerosmith announced that they would be going on a "farewell" tour in Europe in the spring and summer of 2017, titled the Aero-Vederci Baby! Tour. The tour launched in Tel Aviv, Israel, on May 17, 2017, where approximately 45,000 tickets were sold. In early July, the band completed the European leg of the tour; the band extended the tour to South America in September and October 2017, but the last few shows had to be canceled due to health issues. According to Brad Whitford, the tour could end anytime from 2017 to the next four years in 2021. On January 19, 2018, Perry released a solo disc titled Sweetzerland Manifesto. He also announced that the 2017 tour titled "Aero-Vederci Baby!" was not really a final tour and the band will be touring in 2019 to celebrate their 50th anniversary.

=== Deuces are Wild residency (2019–2022) ===
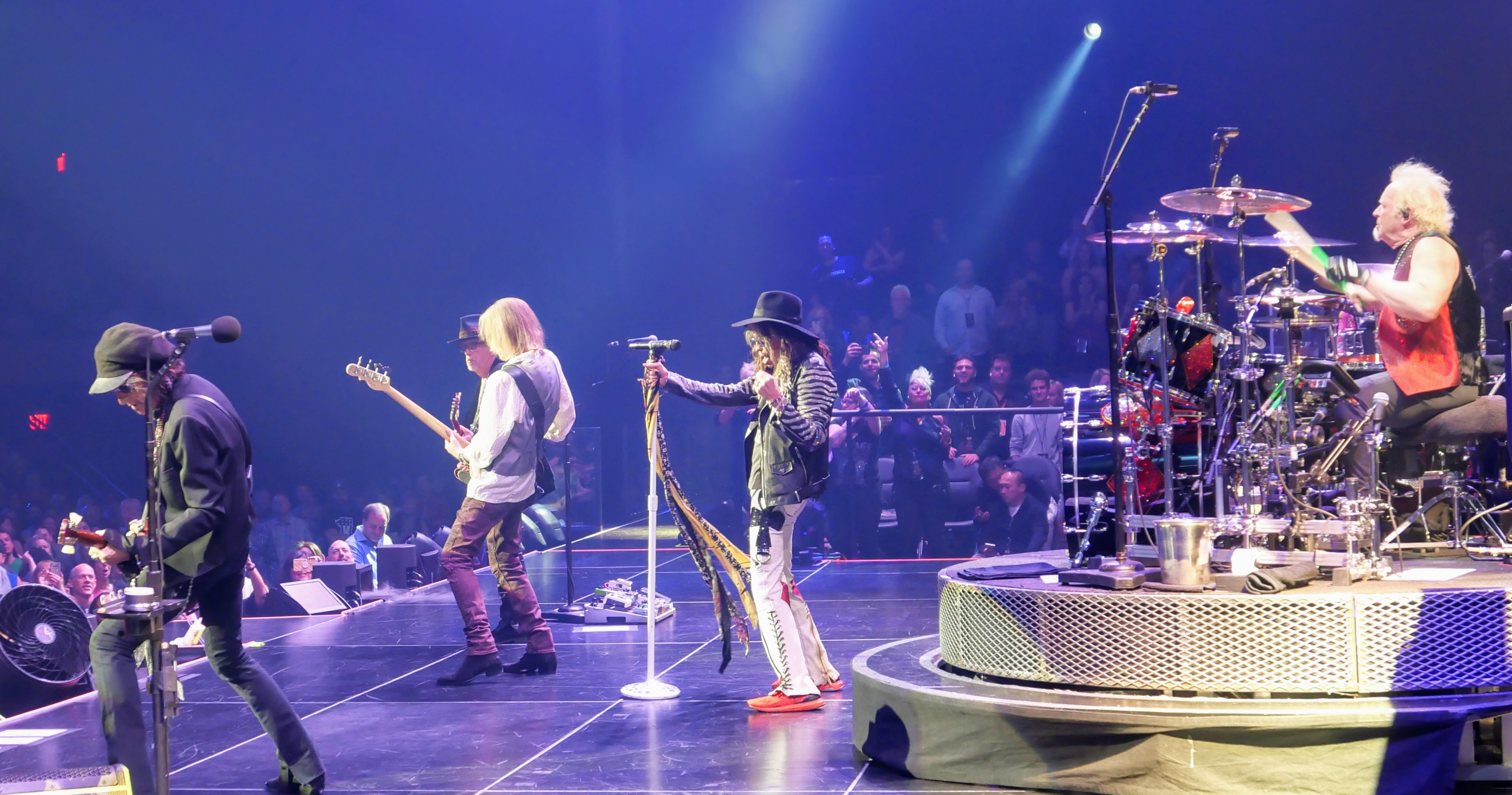
Aerosmith performing in Las Vegas during the band's 2019 Deuces Are Wild residency

Aerosmith appeared on NBC's Today show on August 15, 2018, to announce a residency in Las Vegas called Deuces are Wild, a reference to both Las Vegas casino gambling and their 1994 single of the same name. The band's Las Vegas residency took place in April, June, July, and September thru December 2019. It had been scheduled to be extended into January, February, May, and June 2020 at the Park Theater, but the 2020 dates were cut short due to the COVID-19 pandemic. In addition to the Las Vegas shows, in mid-July 2019, the band performed at a festival in Minnesota, and in August 2019, they played a total of nine shows spread across three MGM venues in Maryland, New Jersey, and Massachusetts.

In 2019, a European tour was announced, due to take place through the summer of 2020 following the completion of their Las Vegas dates. However, the shows were canceled in the wake of the COVID-19 pandemic, as was a 50th Anniversary show at Boston's Fenway Park, originally planned for September 2020. The European dates were initially rescheduled for the summer of 2021 but were later moved again to summer 2022 due to the ongoing pandemic.

In January 2019, Joe Perry stated that he and Steven Tyler were due to start recording new material together for a new Aerosmith album. The next month, on February 14, 2019, Aerosmith was scheduled to receive a star on the Hollywood Walk of Fame, but the ceremony and installation were postponed due to inclement weather with a new date to be determined later.

In April 2019, drummer Joey Kramer suffered minor injuries to his shoulder following an unspecified accident, and was forced to stand down from several concerts of the band's Las Vegas residency. His drum technician John Douglas substituted for him. In November of that same year, Kramer told several news sites that he was not allowed to rejoin the band despite his recovery, to which the band responded that his playing was "not up to Aerosmith standards". The disagreement culminated in a series of lawsuits in January 2020, after which Kramer was expected to be barred from performing with the band at the 2020 Grammy Awards. Kramer rejoined Aerosmith in February 2020 for their Las Vegas residency.

In an August 2020 interview with former The Black Crowes drummer Steve Gorman, on his radio show Steve Gorman Rocks, Brad Whitford was asked what the future of Aerosmith looked like. His response was "I don't really know what they want to do. And, I don't really care because, um, truthfully, I'm not interested anymore", citing ongoing dysfunction within the band. He expressed similar concerns in an interview with Joe Bonamassa on his "Live From Nerdville" podcast in June 2021. Whitford shared his thoughts about how the COVID-19 outbreak would affect touring plans for Aerosmith, and musicians in general, while acknowledging his and his bandmate's current ages. Stating, "I mean, I have my doubts about Aerosmith ever performing again at this stage because age is becoming a real factor. It is what it is."

On August 23, 2021, Aerosmith signed a distribution deal with Universal Music Group, covering the band's entire catalog – both Geffen (Universal's subsidiary) and Columbia titles.

In March 2022, following the cancellation of the rescheduled European tour, Aerosmith announced that the Deuces Are Wild residency would both continue and expand, beginning in June and running through December, along with the rescheduled Fenway Park show in September. Kramer was also confirmed to be sitting out all concerts, with the band claiming that he would be focusing "his full attention on his family during these uncertain times." Aerosmith announced on May 24, 2022, that the June and July dates of the Deuces Are Wild residency would be canceled as a result of Tyler checking himself into a rehab facility after he suffered a relapse following his pain management of a foot surgery. Following Tyler's 30+ day rehab treatment, the band went on to perform at Boston's Fenway Park for their 50th anniversary show and then resumed their Las Vegas residency, scheduled September through December 2022.

=== Peace Out: The Farewell Tour, retirement from touring and One More Time (2023–2025) ===
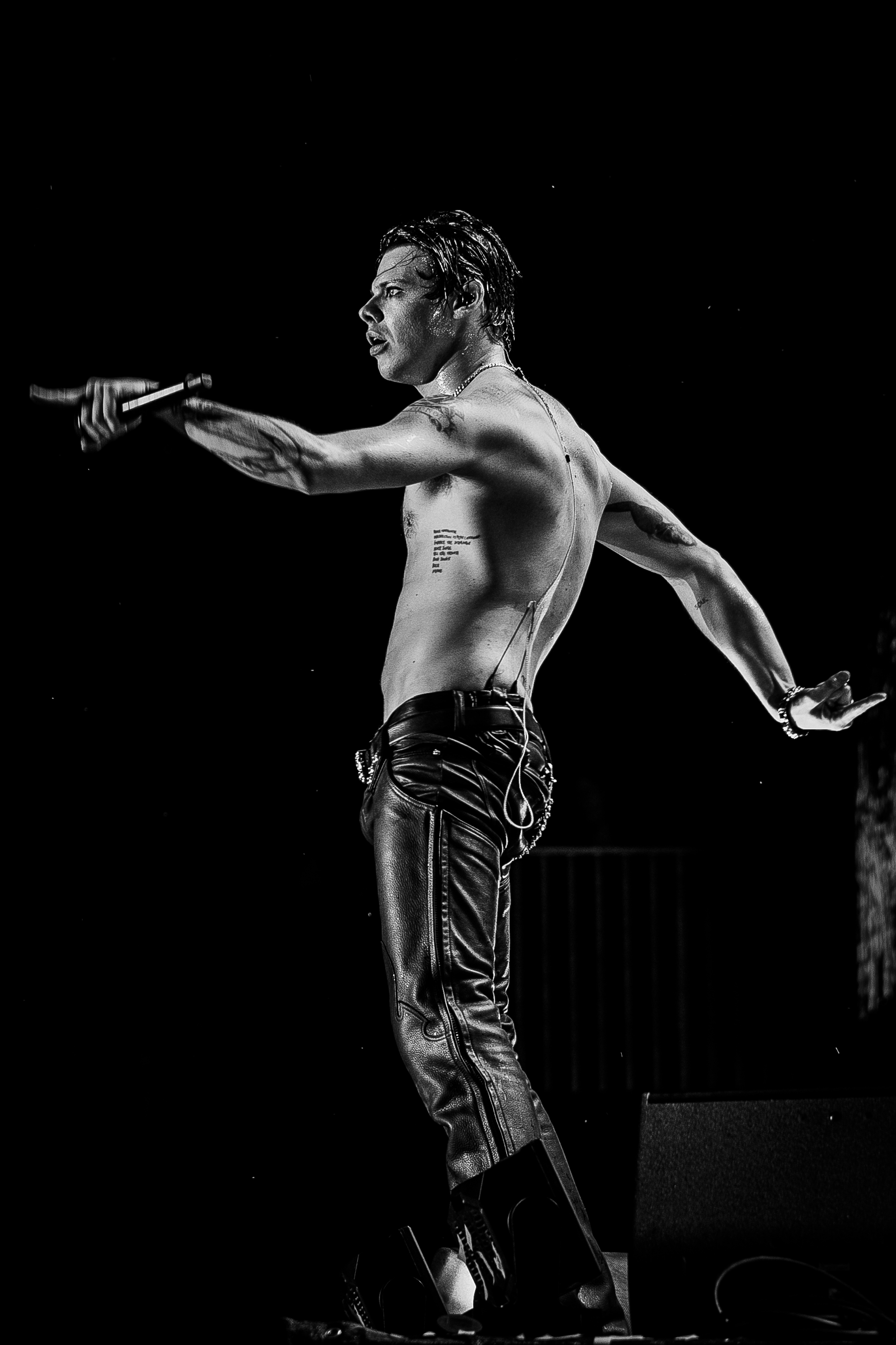
Yungblud, who collaborated with Aerosmith for their 2025 EP One More Time

In May 2023, the band announced a farewell tour called Peace Out: The Farewell Tour that would begin in September. The tour would send the band to 40 North American locations through January 2024, and would include The Black Crowes as the opening act. The tour would not include original drummer Joey Kramer. Shortly after the tour began, however, it was announced that it was being delayed until the following year due to Tyler badly injuring his vocal cords during a performance on September 9. The tour was rescheduled to begin in September 2024 and proceed through February 2025.

On August 2, 2024, the tour was canceled and the band announced their immediate retirement from touring, due to Tyler being unable to recover from his vocal cord injury. Perry has stated that he does not rule out new music from Aerosmith. In an August 29, 2024 interview with AARP: The Magazine, Tom Hamilton said "the band is still alive", and when asked about the future of the band, he said, "On the hope scale, I'm somewhere between 7 and 9. We won't be doing any tours from now on, but I'll always have hope that other types of opportunities will come along. This isn't the first time black clouds have been on our horizon – and somehow the sun managed to come out. Time and hope are all we have at the moment." Hamilton was asked about new music and his response was, "So far there hasn't been any talk about a new Aerosmith album." In January 2025, Hamilton discussed the possibility of recording with Tyler "in the future". On January 23, 2025, Aerosmith announced a reunion show with Tyler as a celebration for the 67th Annual Grammy Awards and a benefit concert for fire firefighters during the Southern California wildfires.

In August 2025, Perry told WZLX that he and the rest of the band had "actually talking quite a bit" about the possibility of Aerosmith returning to the stage. He said, "I would say, at some point...we will all be together on the same stage...If I was a betting man, which I am, I would say, at some point something's gonna happen. But we'll see." In an interview with WBUR that same month, Perry said that he "would bet that there's an Aerosmith show left" but expressed doubt that the band would ever tour again, stating, "I've been spending a lot of time with Steven and he just doesn't want to tour and he can't tour. It's tough. I'm not sure I would want to go out and book another 40-city tour."

Aerosmith and Yungblud released a collaborative EP, One More Time, on November 21, 2025, on Capitol Records, making it the band's first release outside of Columbia in more than three decades. It marked as Aerosmith's first number one in the UK.

=== Return to live performances (2026–present) ===
Aerosmith played their first shows in three years at the Hollywood Bowl in Los Angeles on October 29 and November 1, 2026. Dubbed "California, Dream On: Aerosmith & Friends", the shows included support from Guns N' Roses, the Black Crowes, Run-DMC and Heart, and also included participation from Sammy Hagar, Tom Morello, the Red Hot Chili Peppers' Chad Smith, Alice in Chains' Jerry Cantrell and Mike Inez, Extreme's Nuno Bettencourt, Godsmack's Sully Erna, Steve Stevens, Kenny Aronoff and Train's Pat Monahan. Kramer joined the band for the first time since 2020 to perform "Walk This Way" on both nights, while Dave Grohl and John Douglas filled in for the rest of the performances.

== Legacy ==
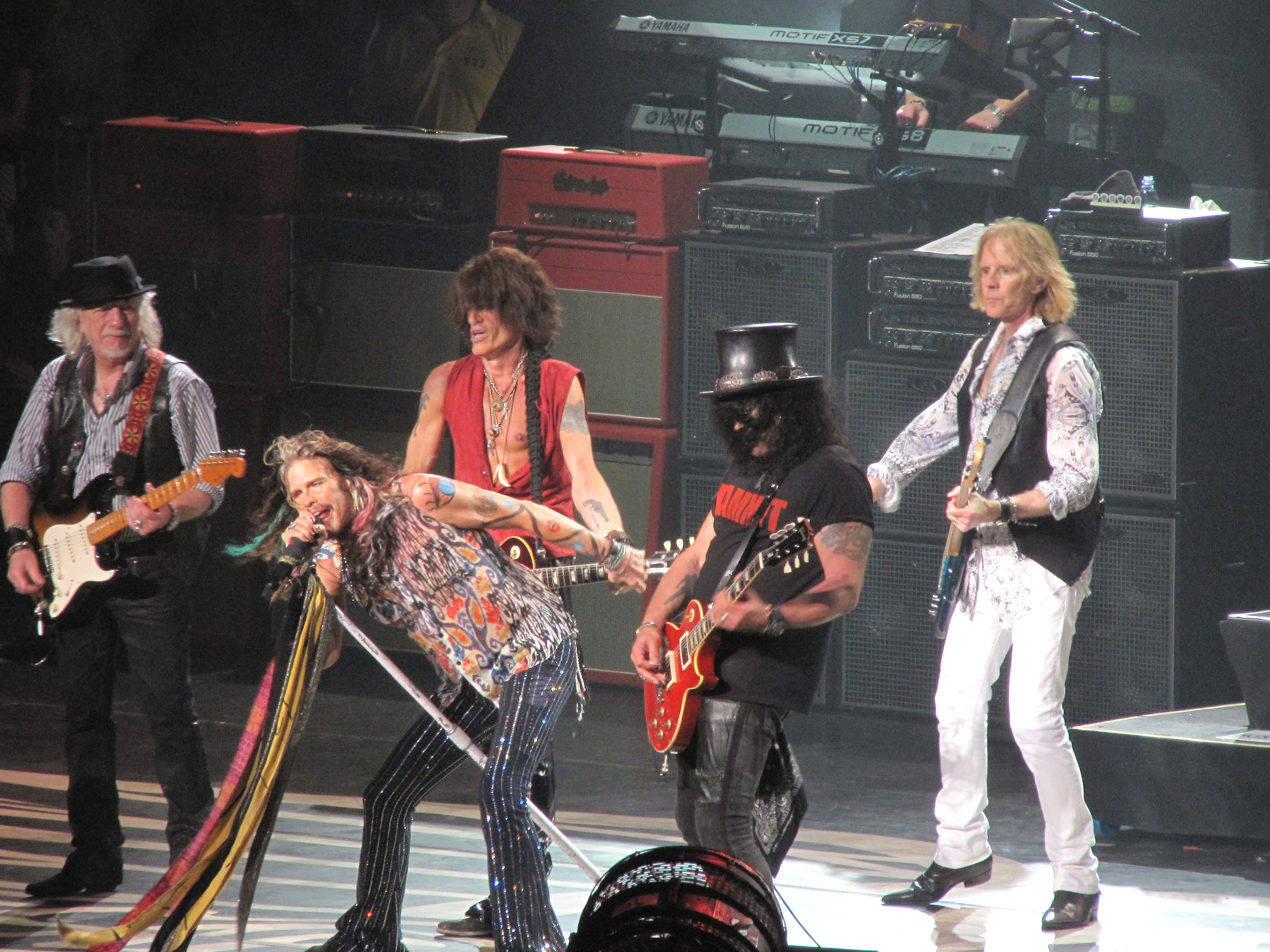
Slash performing with Aerosmith in 2014. He has cited the band as one of his biggest influences

Influenced by bands such as the Beatles, the Rolling Stones, the Yardbirds, Led Zeppelin, and the New York Dolls, Aerosmith proved to be a major influence themselves on subsequently massively successful bands and musicians; according to Perry, Eddie Van Halen once told him that his band Van Halen "started out on the suburban L.A. club circuit, playing Aerosmith songs". Aerosmith's influence was evident on the next generation of hard rock and heavy metal bands, namely Mötley Crüe, Ratt, Guns N' Roses, Tesla, L.A. Guns, Cinderella, Faster Pussycat, Skid Row, Extreme, Warrant, Inglorious, the Black Crowes, and the Quireboys, as well as Metallica, Metal Church, and Testament. The BulletBoys wrote a song for their first album called "Owed to Joe" about Aerosmith and the debt that next generation of guitarists owed to Joe Perry. Especially, Guns N' Roses and Velvet Revolver guitarist Slash has stated that Aerosmith is his favorite band, and Mötley Crüe's Nikki Sixx has expressed massive admiration for the band and its early records in both The Dirt and The Heroin Diaries. Members of alternative rock bands such as Nirvana, Mother Love Bone/Pearl Jam, Radiohead, Stone Temple Pilots, Staind and Godsmack are also self-professed early Aerosmith fans.

The interplay between Joe Perry and Brad Whitford has been inspiring to many bands, especially Guns N' Roses. Joe Perry has received wide recognition and praise as a lead guitarist, and has shared the stage many times with Jimmy Page and Jeff Beck, who Perry cites as primary influences. He and Tyler were asked by Page to induct Led Zeppelin into the Rock and Roll Hall of Fame; during the ceremony, which took place in 1995, Tyler and Perry delivered their speech and joined the band onstage for a brief set. During Beck's and Metallica's induction in 2009, they invited Perry and Page to play the Yardbirds/Zeppelin/Aerosmith classic "Train Kept A-Rollin'". Other collaborations, either by individual members of the band or by Aerosmith as a whole, have included Alice Cooper on his Trash album, Guns N' Roses (who opened for Aerosmith during their 1988 tour and had covered "Mama Kin" on their first release), and B'z. As a testimony to their importance in American popular culture as a whole, Aerosmith have also collaborated with popular non-rock artists, such as Run-DMC, Eminem ("Sing for the Moment"), and Carrie Underwood, and performed with 'N Sync, Britney Spears, Mary J. Blige, and Nelly for the Super Bowl XXXV halftime show. Country artists Garth Brooks and Mark Chesnutt both scored hit singles with covers of Aerosmith songs; Brooks in 1995 with "The Fever", a reworking of Aerosmith's 1993 song, and Chesnutt in 1999 with a cover of Aerosmith's 1998 song "I Don't Want to Miss a Thing".

Like many of their 1970s contemporaries including Led Zeppelin and Alice Cooper, the members of Aerosmith were prone to excess and debauchery. Drug consumption was rampant; the recording sessions for 1976's Rocks and 1977's Draw the Line were especially noted for their substance indulgence, including heroin. In the words of Bebe Buell, "They [Aerosmith] were like a gang of kids with their own planes, Porsches, millions of dollars, limitless resources. [...] Mick Jagger and Jimmy Page had control, but these boys did not care. They won the prize, hands down, for the rowdiest rock 'n' roll band in that era. No question."

In the mid to late 1970s, the band enjoyed tremendous popularity in the United States and in Japan, though they failed to make a big impression in Britain. Still, they were among the most popular hard rock acts in America in the mid to late 1970s, along with Heart, Kiss, Ted Nugent, ZZ Top, and Boston. Their massive popularity waned, however, following Perry and Whitford's departures. Following both guitarists' return to the band and its complete drug cleanup, Aerosmith made a prodigious return to success, once described as "the single most successful comeback in the history of heavy metal, if not all of popular music." During both the 1970s and the 1987–1995 era, Aerosmith undertook grueling world tours that numbered in the triple digits numbers of dates, headlining or co-headlining festivals along the way, such as the Texxas Jam in 1978 and 1987, the Monsters of Rock festival at Castle Donington, England in 1990 and 1994, and Woodstock '94.

Initially resistant to this medium, the band later became renowned and received numerous awards for pioneering expansive, conceptual music videos, such as those for "Janie's Got a Gun" (directed by future Fight Club director David Fincher), "Livin' on the Edge", "Cryin'", "Amazing", "Crazy", "Falling in Love (Is Hard on the Knees)", and "Pink".

Aerosmith was the first band to have its band-centered Guitar Hero title, Guitar Hero: Aerosmith, which is considered to be the best-selling band-centric video game across both the Guitar Hero and Rock Band platforms.

== Band members ==
Current members

- Steven Tyler – lead vocals, keyboards, harmonica, percussion (1970–present)
- Tom Hamilton – bass, backing vocals (1970–present)
- Joey Kramer – drums, percussion (1970–present)
- Joe Perry – guitar, backing and occasional lead vocals (1970–1979, 1984–present)
- Brad Whitford – guitar, backing vocals (1971–1981, 1984–present)

Early members

- Ray Tabano – rhythm guitar (1970–1971)
- Jimmy Crespo – lead and rhythm guitar, backing vocals (1979–1984)
- Rick Dufay – rhythm guitar (1982–1984)

== Awards and achievements ==
Despite Aerosmith's popularity and success in the 1970s, it wasn't until their comeback in the late-1980s and 1990s when they started winning awards and major recognition. In 1987, Aerosmith won the Soul Train Music Award for Best Rap Single for the re-mix of "Walk This Way" with Run-DMC In 1990, Aerosmith won their first Grammy award, for Best Rock Performance by a Duo or Group with Vocal, and went on to win a total of four such awards (all of them in the 1990s) for "Janie's Got a Gun", "Livin' on the Edge", "Crazy", and "Pink". Aerosmith is second only to U2 in the number of awards won in that category.

In addition, Aerosmith's music videos won numerous awards throughout the 1990s. Aerosmith ranks as the ninth most successful artist (and the third most successful group) of all-time at the MTV Video Music Awards (VMAs), with ten such awards to date. Aerosmith is also the all-time leader in the categories Best Rock Video (with four such awards) and Viewer's Choice (with three such awards). Aerosmith has also won once each in the categories Video of the Year, Best Group Video, and Best Video from a Film. The videos for which Aerosmith has won VMAs are "Janie's Got a Gun" (2 awards), "The Other Side", "Livin' on the Edge", "Cryin'" (3 awards), "Falling in Love (Is Hard on the Knees)", "Pink", and "I Don't Want to Miss a Thing".

Over the course of their career (primarily 1990 and after), Aerosmith has also collected six American Music Awards, four Billboard Music Awards, two People's Choice Awards, sixteen Boston Music Awards, and numerous other awards and honors. Some of the high accolades Aerosmith have achieved include induction into Hollywood's Rock Walk in 1990, a declaration of "Aerosmith Day" in the state of Massachusetts by then-Governor William Weld on April 13, 1993, induction into the Rock and Roll Hall of Fame in 2001, and being honored with the mtvICON award in 2002.

In the fields of technology and video games, Aerosmith has achieved several feats. In 1994, Aerosmith released the song "Head First" on the CompuServe online service, which is considered to be the first full-length commercial product available online. In 2008, Aerosmith became the first artist to have an entire Guitar Hero video game based around them with Guitar Hero: Aerosmith. Guitar Hero: Aerosmith is considered to be the best-selling band-centric video game across both the Guitar Hero and Rock Band platforms.

Aerosmith also holds several chart and album sales feats, including the second highest number of number-one singles on the Mainstream Rock Tracks chart for a group with nine, the only number one debut on the Billboard Hot 100 by a rock group with "I Don't Want to Miss a Thing", the second most gold albums by an American group behind Kiss who has 30, the most total certifications (including gold, platinum, and multi-platinum combined) by an American group, and are tied with Van Halen for the most multi-platinum albums by an American group. From the Recording Industry Association of America, Aerosmith has achieved 25 gold, 18 platinum, and 12 multi-platinum album certifications, in addition to one diamond album, four gold singles, and one platinum digital single. Media often refer to Aerosmith, who have sold more than 150 million albums worldwide and 69.5 million in the United States, as the best-selling American rock band.

Aerosmith were honored as MusiCares Person of the Year in 2020.

=== Rankings ===
- "Dream On", "Toys in the Attic", and "Walk This Way" (with Run-D.M.C.) are all listed in The Rock and Roll Hall of Fame's 500 Songs that Shaped Rock and Roll.
- In 1993, Rolling Stone's list of the "Top 100 Music Videos" included "Walk This Way" (with Run-D.M.C.) at number 11 and "Janie's Got a Gun" at number 95.
- In 1999, MTV's "100 Greatest Videos Ever Made" included "Walk This Way" (with Run-D.M.C.) at number 5 and "Janie's Got a Gun" at number 48.
- In 2000, VH1's "100 Greatest Rock Songs" included "Walk This Way" at number 35 and "Dream On" at number 47.
- In 2001, "VH1: 100 Greatest Videos" included "Walk This Way" (with Run-D.M.C.) at number 11, "Crazy" at number 23, and "Janie's Got a Gun" at number 48.
- In 2003, Rolling Stone's 500 Greatest Albums of All Time included Rocks at number 176 and Toys in the Attic at number 228.
- In 2004, Rolling Stone's The 500 Greatest Songs of All Time included "Dream On" at number 172, "Walk This Way" (with Run-D.M.C.) at number 287, "Walk This Way" (original) at number 336, and "Sweet Emotion" at number 408.
- In 2004, Rolling Stone ranked Aerosmith number 57 on their list of the "100 Greatest Artists of All Time".
- In 2008, Rolling Stone ranked the original version of "Walk This Way" at number 34 on their list of the 100 Greatest Guitar Songs of All Time.
- In 2010, Aerosmith were ranked number 30 on VH1's "100 Greatest Artists of All Time".
- In 2013, Ultimate Classic Rock website ranked "Sweet Emotion" number 1 in their Top 100 Classic Rock Songs chart.
- Pump, which reached number 1 on the Australian Recording Industry Association charts and yielded two top-10 hit singles. Pump sold more than 150,000 units on Warner Music (which distributed Geffen in Australia until 1990) and more than 60,000 units after Universal took over.

== Discography ==
Studio albums

- Aerosmith (1973)
- Get Your Wings (1974)
- Toys in the Attic (1975)
- Rocks (1976)
- Draw the Line (1977)
- Night in the Ruts (1979)
- Rock in a Hard Place (1982)
- Done with Mirrors (1985)
- Permanent Vacation (1987)
- Pump (1989)
- Get a Grip (1993)
- Nine Lives (1997)
- Just Push Play (2001)
- Honkin' on Bobo (2004)
- Music from Another Dimension! (2012)

== Media ==
In addition to recording and performing music, Aerosmith has also been involved with films, television, video games, pinball, and music videos. In 1978, the band starred as the "Future Villain Band" in the film Sgt. Pepper's Lonely Hearts Club Band. Later, when the band resurrected itself in the late 1980s and 1990s, Aerosmith made further appearances, including the "Wayne's World" sketch on Saturday Night Live in 1990, the "Flaming Moe's" episode of The Simpsons in 1991, and the film Wayne's World 2 in 1993. The band also appeared in the 2005 John Travolta/Uma Thurman comedy Be Cool, in which Steven Tyler and Thurman's characters help bring pop music star Linda Moon (Christina Milian) into the limelight. The band also opened for the 1993 movie "Dazed and Confused" with "Sweet Emotion" likely added as it was a very traditional rock number from the 1970s

The band has been the subject of several video games including Revolution X in 1994, Quest for Fame in 1995, and Guitar Hero: Aerosmith, in June 2008. The band has also made over 30 major music videos, and released seven home videos or DVDs.

In 2017, Stern released three versions of a pinball machine titled, Aerosmith, which featured original versions of nine of the band's iconic songs, as well as Elevator and Toy-Box multiballs.

== Tours ==
Concert tours

- Aerosmith Tour (1973)
- Get Your Wings Tour (1974)
- Toys in the Attic Tour (1975)
- Rocks Tour (1976–77)
- Aerosmith Express Tour (1977–1978)
- Live! Bootleg Tour (1978)
- Night in the Ruts Tour (1979–1980)
- Rock in a Hard Place Tour (1982–1983)
- Back in the Saddle Tour (1984)
- Done with Mirrors Tour (1985–86)
- Permanent Vacation Tour (1987–1988)
- Pump Tour (1989–1990)
- Get a Grip Tour (1993–1994)
- Nine Lives Tour (1997–1999)
- Roar of the Dragon Tour (1999–2000)
- Just Push Play Tour (2001–2002)
- Girls of Summer Tour (2002)
- Rocksimus Maximus Tour (2003)
- Honkin' on Bobo Tour (2004)
- Rockin' the Joint Tour (2005–2006)
- Route of All Evil Tour (2006)
- Aerosmith World Tour 2007 (2007)
- Aerosmith/ZZ Top Tour (2009)
- Cocked, Locked, Ready to Rock Tour (2010)
- Back on the Road Tour (2011)
- Global Warming Tour (2012–2014)
- Let Rock Rule Tour (2014)
- Blue Army Tour (2015)
- Rock 'N' Roll Rumble Tour (2016)
- Aero-Vederci Baby! Tour (2017–2018)
- Peace Out: The Farewell Tour (2023)

Concert residencies

- Aerosmith: Deuces are Wild (2019–2022)

== See also ==
- Aero Force One
- Honorific nicknames in popular music
- List of artists who reached number one on the Australian singles chart
- List of artists who reached number one in the United States
- List of artists who reached number one on the U.S. Mainstream Rock chart
- List of best-selling music artists
- List of blues rock musicians
- List of glam metal bands and artists
- List of hard rock musicians (A–M)
- List of heavy metal bands
- List of highest-certified music artists in the United States
