= Nine Lives Tour =

1997–99 concert tour by Aerosmith

- Tour by Aerosmith
- Associated album: Nine Lives; A Little South of Sanity
- Start date: May 8, 1997
- End date: July 17, 1999
- Legs: 11
- No. of shows: approx. 283 (scheduled); 204 (played); 43 (cancelled); 36 (rearranged)

Aerosmith concert chronology
- Get a Grip Tour (1993–1994); Nine Lives Tour (1997–1999); Roar of the Dragon Tour (1999–2000)

The Nine Lives Tour saw Aerosmith playing in North America, Japan, the United Kingdom, Germany, Spain, Czech Republic, Belgium, France, Switzerland, Holland, Italy, Austria, Finland, Sweden, Denmark and Portugal. It initially promoted their 1997 release Nine Lives and ran from May 1997 to July 1999.

The length of the tour was due to the chart-topping success of "I Don't Want to Miss a Thing". "We were just about to go off the road and that song came around," explained drummer Joey Kramer. "We continued to tour off that song for another year. That was welcomed by the band. At that time, that was what we did: we would be on the road for twelve or eighteen months, and the only time we came off the road was to make another record."

The tour included a range of support acts. Some opened on entire legs of the tour, others for only half. Some performers appeared at selected dates and others performed just once. They included Shed Seven, Kula Shaker, 3 Colours Red, Jonny Lang, Marry Me Jane, Talk Show, Days of the New, Kenny Wayne Shepherd, Spacehog, Monster Magnet, Fuel, Fighting Gravity, Seven Mary Three, Candlebox, The Afghan Whigs, The Black Crowes, Lenny Kravitz, Bryan Adams, Stereophonics, Skunk Anansie, Ministry and Guano Apes. For a run of European shows in the summer of 1998, their opening act was scheduled to be Faith No More (who had earlier performed alongside Aerosmith at the Monsters of Rock Festival in 1990) but this never came to be, since Faith No More would announce their breakup in late April 1998.

Several dates were cancelled, owing to Kramer and singer Steven Tyler recovering from serious injuries that occurred on separate occasions.

== Setlist ==
A standard show on the Nine Lives Tour consisted of 24 tracks, 2 and a half hour stage time. The minimum number of songs played at a show on this tour was 12, and the maximum number of songs played at a show on this tour was 28 songs, played at select shows.

"Cryin'", "Dream On", "Love in an Elevator", "Pink", "Sweet Emotion" and "Walk This Way" were the only songs which were played at every single show on the Nine Lives Tour. The title track from the new record, "Nine Lives", was the opening song at most shows.

1. "Nine Lives"
2. "Love in an Elevator"
3. "Falling in Love (Is Hard on the Knees)"
4. "Eat the Rich"
5. "Livin' on the Edge"
6. "Dream On"
7. "Taste of India"
8. "Janie's Got a Gun"
9. "What Kind of Love Are You On"
10. "Last Child"
11. "Rag Doll"
12. "Pink"
13. "Draw the Line"
14. "Stop Messin' Around"
15. "Mother Popcorn"
16. "intro"
17. "Walk This Way"
18. "I Don't Wanna Miss A Thing"
19. "Cryin'"
20. "Dude (Looks Like a Lady)"
21. "Come Together"
22. "What it Takes"
23. "Sweet Emotion"

== Tour dates ==
Date	City	Country	Venue
Europe I
May 8, 1997	Newcastle	England	Newcastle Arena
May 10, 1997	Manchester	England	NYNEX Arena
May 12, 1997	Hamburg	Germany	Alsterdorfer Sporthalle
May 15, 1997	Helsinki	Finland	Hartwall Arena
May 17, 1997	Nürburg	Germany	Rock am Ring
May 18, 1997	Nuremberg	Germany	Rock im Park
May 20, 1997	Prague	Czech Republic	Prague Sports Hall
May 23, 1997	Vienna	Austria	Wiener Stadthalle
May 25, 1997	Milan	Italy	Forum di Assago
May 27, 1997	Rotterdam	Netherlands	Rotterdam Ahoy
May 29, 1997	Ghent	Belgium	Flanders Expo
May 31, 1997	Birmingham	England	NEC Arena
June 2, 1997	Glasgow	Scotland	S.E.C.C. Arena
June 4, 1997	London	England	Wembley Arena
June 5, 1997	London	England	Wembley Arena
June 7, 1997	Lyon	France	Halle Tony Garnier
June 9, 1997	Zürich	Switzerland	Hallenstadion
June 11, 1997	Paris	France	Palais omnisports de Paris-Bercy
June 13, 1997	Barcelona	Spain	Palau Sant Jordi
June 15, 1997	Madrid	Spain	Palacio de los Deportes
North America I
June 30, 1997	Old Orchard Beach	United States	Seashore Performing Arts Center
July 2, 1997	Ottawa	Canada	Corel Centre
July 4, 1997	Montreal	Canada	Molson Centre
July 6, 1997	Toronto	Canada	Molson Amphitheatre
July 9, 1997	Darien Lake	United States	Darien Lake Performing Arts Center
July 11, 1997	Mansfield	United States	Great Woods Center for the Performing Arts
July 12, 1997	Mansfield	United States	Great Woods Center for the Performing Arts
July 14, 1997	Richmond	United States	Classic Amphitheatre at Strawberry Hill
July 16, 1997	Burgettstown	United States	Coca-Cola Star Lake Amphitheater
July 18, 1997	Camden	United States	Blockbuster-Sony Music Entertainment Centre
July 20, 1997	Saratoga Springs	United States	Saratoga Performing Arts Center
July 29, 1997	Virginia Beach	United States	GTE Virginia Beach Amphitheater
July 31, 1997	Hershey	United States	Hershey Park Stadium
August 2, 1997	Bristow	United States	Nissan Pavilion
August 4, 1997	Scranton	United States	Montage Mountain Performing Arts Center
August 6, 1997	New York City	United States	Madison Square Garden
August 9, 1997	Hartford	United States	Meadows Music Theater
August 10, 1997	Holmdel	United States	PNC Bank Arts Center
August 12, 1997	Cuyahoga Falls	United States	Blossom Music Center
August 14, 1997	Minneapolis	United States	Target Center
August 16, 1997	East Troy	United States	Alpine Valley Music Theatre
August 18, 1997	Cincinnati	United States	Riverbend Music Center
August 21, 1997	Auburn Hills	United States	The Palace of Auburn Hills
August 22, 1997	Auburn Hills	United States	The Palace of Auburn Hills
August 24, 1997	Maryland Heights	United States	Riverport Amphitheater
August 26, 1997	Bonner Springs	United States	Sandstone Amphitheater
August 28, 1997	Columbus	United States	Polaris Amphitheater
August 30, 1997	Tinley Park	United States	New World Music Theatre
August 31, 1997	Noblesville	United States	Deer Creek Music Center
North America II
September 23, 1997	Raleigh	United States	Hardee's Walnut Creek Amphitheatre
September 25, 1997	Charlotte	United States	Blockbuster Pavilion
September 27, 1997	Atlanta	United States	Lakewood Amphitheater
September 29, 1997	Lafayette	United States	Cajundome
October 1, 1997	Memphis	United States	Pyramid Arena
October 3, 1997	Orlando	United States	Orlando Arena
October 5, 1997	West Palm Beach	United States	Coral Sky Amphitheater
October 7, 1997	Antioch	United States	Starwood Amphitheater
October 9, 1997	Dallas	United States	Starplex Amphitheater
October 11, 1997	Houston	United States	The Summit
October 13, 1997	Phoenix	United States	Blockbuster Desert Sky Pavilion
October 16, 1997	Mountain View	United States	Shoreline Amphitheater
October 18, 1997	Devore	United States	Blockbuster Pavilion
October 20, 1997	Concord	United States	Concord Pavilion
October 22, 1997	Seattle	United States	KeyArena
October 24, 1997	Portland	United States	Rose Garden Arena
October 25, 1997	Vancouver	Canada	Pacific Coliseum
North America III
November 22, 1997	Jacksonville	United States	Jacksonville Coliseum
November 24, 1997	Tampa	United States	Ice Palace
November 26, 1997	Biloxi	United States	Mississippi Coast Coliseum
November 28, 1997	Tupelo	United States	Tupelo Coliseum
November 29, 1997	Birmingham	United States	Birmingham-Jefferson Civic Center
December 2, 1997	Little Rock	United States	Barton Coliseum
December 4, 1997	Austin	United States	Frank Erwin Center
December 8, 1997	El Paso	United States	Don Haskins Center
December 10, 1997	Albuquerque	United States	Tingley Coliseum
December 12, 1997	San Diego	United States	Cox Arena
December 14, 1997	Las Vegas	United States	MGM Grand Garden Arena
December 16, 1997	Anaheim	United States	Arrowhead Pond
December 18, 1997	San Antonio	United States	Alamodome
December 20, 1997	Oklahoma City	United States	Myriad Convention Center
December 21, 1997	Valley Center	United States	Kansas Coliseum
December 30, 1997	Boston	United States	Fleet Center
December 31, 1997	Boston	United States	Fleet Center
January 3, 1998	Landover	United States	US Air Arena
January 7, 1998	Portland	United States	Cumberland County Civic Center
January 9, 1998	Pittsburgh	United States	Pittsburgh Civic Arena
January 11, 1998	Rochester	United States	Rochester Community War Memorial
January 13, 1998	Albany	United States	Pepsi Arena
January 15, 1998	Philadelphia	United States	CoreStates Spectrum
January 16, 1998	Boston	United States	Mama Kins Music Hall
January 17, 1998	New Haven	United States	New Haven Coliseum
January 19, 1998	State College	United States	Bryce Jordan Center
January 21, 1998	Syracuse	United States	Onondaga County War Memorial
January 23, 1998	Charleston	United States	Charleston Civic Center
January 24, 1998	North Charleston	United States	North Charleston Coliseum
January 27, 1998	Roanoke	United States	Roanoke Civic Center
January 29, 1998	Columbia	United States	Carolina Coliseum
January 31, 1998	Greensboro	United States	Greensboro Coliseum
February 2, 1998	Lexington	United States	Rupp Arena
February 4, 1998	Grand Rapids	United States	Van Andel Arena
February 6, 1998	Ames	United States	Hilton Coliseum
February 8, 1998	Madison	United States	Kohl Center
February 10, 1998	Auburn Hills	United States	The Palace of Auburn Hills
Japan
March 1, 1998	Nagoya	Japan	Nagoya Dome
March 3, 1998	Osaka	Japan	Osaka Dome
March 5, 1998	Fukuoka	Japan	Fukuoka Dome
March 8, 1998	Tokyo	Japan	Tokyo Dome
March 9, 1998	Tokyo	Japan	Tokyo Dome
March 12, 1998	Yokohama	Japan	Yokohama Arena
March 14, 1998	Yokohama	Japan	Yokohama Arena
North America IV
April 18, 1998	Salt Lake City	United States	Delta Center
April 20, 1998	Denver	United States	McNichols Sports Arena
April 22, 1998	Colorado Springs	United States	World Arena
April 24, 1998	Spokane	United States	Spokane Arena
April 27, 1998	Anchorage	United States	Sullivan Arena
April 29, 1998	Anchorage	United States	Sullivan Arena
Europe II Dates were canceled after Steven Tyler suffered a cruciate knee ligament injury after dropping the microphone stand on his knee during "Mama Kin" on April 29, 1998.
June 26, 1998	Saint Petersburg	Russia	~~Kirov or Petrovsky Stadium~~
June 28, 1998	Moscow	Russia	~~Luzhniki Stadium~~
July 1, 1998	Oulu	Finland	~~Oulu Baseball Stadium~~
July 3, 1998	Ringe	Denmark	~~Midtfyns Festival~~
July 5, 1998	Belfort	France	~~Les Eurockéenes de Belfort~~
July 7, 1998	Paris	France	~~L'Olympia~~
July 9, 1998	Cologne	Germany	~~Sporthalle~~
July 10, 1998	Frauenfeld	Switzerland	~~Out in the Green Festival~~
July 12, 1998	Andorra-la-Vella	Andorra	~~Dr. Music Festival~~
July 14, 1998	Milan	Italy	~~Fila Forum~~
July 16, 1998	Pistoia	Italy	~~Pistoia Festival~~
July 18, 1998	Stuttgart	Germany	~~Blindman's Ball~~
July 19, 1998	Magdeburg	Germany	~~Blindman's Ball~~
July 21, 1998	Katowice	Poland	~~Stadion Slaski~~
July 24, 1998	Stockholm	Sweden	~~Lollipop Festival~~
July 26, 1998	Rotterdam	Netherlands	~~Ahoy~~
July 28, 1998	Sheffield	England	~~Sheffield Arena~~ with Run-D.M.C.
July 30, 1998	Dublin	Ireland	~~Point Theatre~~
August 1, 1998	London	England	~~Wembley Arena~~ with Run-D.M.C.
North America V
September 9, 1998	Scranton	United States	Montage Mountain Performing Arts Center
September 11, 1998	Camden	United States	Blockbuster-Sony Music Entertainment Centre
September 13, 1998	Clarkston	United States	Pine Knob Music Theatre
September 15, 1998	Clarkston	United States	Pine Knob Music Theatre
September 17, 1998	Cincinnati	United States	Riverbend Music Center
September 19, 1998	Tinley Park	United States	World Music Theatre
September 21, 1998	Noblesville	United States	Deer Creek Music Center
September 23, 1998	Columbus	United States	Polaris Amphitheater
September 25, 1998	Maryland Heights	United States	Riverport Amphitheater
September 27, 1998	Bonner Springs	United States	Sandstone Amphitheater
September 29, 1998	Antioch	United States	Starwood Amphitheater
October 1, 1998	Raleigh	United States	Walnut Creek Amphitheater
October 3, 1998	Atlanta	United States	Lakewood Amphitheater
October 5, 1998	Charlotte	United States	Blockbuster Pavilion
October 7, 1998	Virginia Beach	United States	GTE Virginia Beach Amphitheater
October 9, 1998	Bristow	United States	Nissan Pavilion
October 11, 1998	Hartford	United States	Meadows Music Theatre
October 13, 1998	Wantagh	United States	Jones Beach Amphitheater
October 15, 1998	Wantagh	United States	Jones Beach Amphitheater
October 17, 1998	Holmdel	United States	P.N.C. Bank Arts Center; Webcast
October 20, 1998	Montreal	Canada	Molson Centre
October 22, 1998	Quebec City	Canada	Colisee de Quebec
October 24, 1998	Hamilton	Canada	Copps Coliseum
October 26, 1998	Toledo	United States	Toledo Sports Arena
November 3, 1998	Milwaukee	United States	Bradley Center
November 5, 1998	Minneapolis	United States	Target Center
November 7, 1998	Mankato	United States	Mankato Civic Center
November 9, 1998	Omaha	United States	Civic Auditorium
November 11, 1998	Fargo	United States	Fargodome
November 13, 1998	Duluth	United States	Duluth Entertainment Convention Center
November 15, 1998	La Crosse	United States	La Crosse Center
November 17, 1998	Sioux Falls	United States	Sioux Falls Arena
November 19, 1998	Peoria	United States	Peoria Civic Center
November 21, 1998	Evansville	United States	Roberts Municipal Stadium
November 23, 1998	Fort Wayne	United States	Allen County War Memorial Coliseum
November 25, 1998	Moline, Illinois	United States	MARK of the Quad Cities
November 27, 1998	Rockford	United States	Rockford MetroCentre
November 29, 1998	Notre Dame	United States	Joyce Center
December 1, 1998	Grand Rapids	United States	Van Andel Arena
December 3, 1998	Dayton	United States	Ervin J. Nutter Center
December 5, 1998	Carbondale	United States	SIU Arena
December 7, 1998	Knoxville	United States	Thompson–Boling Arena
December 9, 1998	Lexington	United States	Freedom Hall
December 11, 1998	Champaign	United States	Assembly Hall
December 13, 1998	Huntington	United States	Huntington Civic Center
December 15, 1998	Cleveland	United States	Gund Arena
December 17, 1998	Philadelphia	United States	First Union Spectrum
December 19, 1998	Washington, D.C.	United States	MCI Center
December 27, 1998	East Rutherford	United States	Continental Airlines Arena
December 29, 1998	Albany	United States	Pepsi Arena
December 31, 1998	Boston	United States	FleetCenter
January 2, 1999	Worcester	United States	Worcester's Centrum Centre
January 4, 1999	Pittsburgh	United States	Pittsburgh Civic Arena
January 6, 1999	Chattanooga	United States	UTC Arena
North America VI
April 11, 1999	Columbus	United States	Schottenstein Center
April 13, 1999	Memphis	United States	Pyramid Arena
April 15, 1999	Greensboro	United States	Greensboro Coliseum
April 17, 1999	Greenville	United States	Bi-Lo Center
April 19, 1999	Birmingham	United States	Birmingham-Jefferson Civic Center
April 21, 1999	Biloxi	United States	Mississippi Coast Coliseum
April 23, 1999	Lafayette	United States	Cajundome
April 25, 1999	San Antonio	United States	Retama Park
April 27, 1999	The Woodlands	United States	Cynthia Woods Mitchell Pavilion
April 29, 1999	Dallas	United States	Coca-Cola Starplex Amphitheater
May 1, 1999	Greenwood Village	United States	Fiddler's Green Amphitheatre
May 3, 1999	Las Vegas	United States	Thomas & Mack Center
May 7, 1999	Los Angeles	United States	Hollywood Bowl
May 13, 1999	Sacramento	United States	ARCO Arena
May 15, 1999	George	United States	~~The Gorge Amphitheatre~~
May 17, 1999	Salt Lake City	United States	Delta Center
May 20, 1999	Auburn Hills	United States	Palace of Auburn Hills
May 22, 1999	East Troy	United States	Alpine Valley Music Center
May 23, 1999	Tinley Park	United States	World Music Theatre
Europe III
June 10, 1999	Stockholm	Sweden	Globen Arena
June 16, 1999	Munich	Germany	Olympiahalle
June 18, 1999	Linz	Austria	Steel City Festival
June 20, 1999	Zurich	Switzerland	Letzigrund
June 22, 1999	Stuttgart	Germany	Schleyerhalle
June 24, 1999	Cologne	Germany	Kölnarena
June 26, 1999	London	England	Wembley Stadium; Toxic Twin Towers Ball
June 28, 1999	Brussels	Belgium	Forest National
June 30, 1999	Frankfurt	Germany	Festhalle Frankfurt
July 2, 1999	Nijmegen	Netherlands	Veronica[fm] in Concert
July 4, 1999	Erfurt	Germany	Messehalle, Erfurt
July 6, 1999	Berlin	Germany	Waldbühne
July 8, 1999	Ringe	Denmark	Midtfyns Festival
July 11, 1999	Monza	Italy	Monza Rock Festival
July 12, 1999	Naples	Italy	Neapolis Festival
July 15, 1999	Barcelona	Spain	Palau Sant Jordi
July 17, 1999	Lisbon	Portugal	T99 Festival

== Notes ==
From late October 1998 onward, the tour was also called "The Little South of Sanity Tour" given the release of the Geffen live album of the same name.

== Problems ==
A total of 43 shows on the Nine Lives Tour were cancelled and a further 36 shows were rescheduled. The majority of the shows were cancelled/rescheduled due to injuries (Steven Tyler suffered cruciate ligament injury after dropping the microphone stand on his knee, and Joey Kramer suffered second degree burns from a freak accident at a gas station). A select few shows were cancelled/rearranged due to 'scheduling conflict' or the flu.
