= Religion in Varanasi =

Varanasi, also known as Kashi, is considered as the religious capital of Hinduism. In the Hindu faith, it is the holiest of all of its cities; the four dhams (abode of gods) in the four cardinal directions of the country – Badrinath in the north, Puri in the east, Dwarka in the west and Rameshwaram in the south – are all represented in the city in "archetypal forms" as the presiding deities at Badrinath Ghat, Assi's Jagannath Temple area, Shankudhara Pokhra, and Mir Ghat respectively. Other Hindu holy places, such as the Kedarnath at Kedar Ghat, Mathura at Bakaruia Kund or Nakhi Ghat, Prayagraj (Allahadbad) at Dashahvamedha Ghat, Kamakhya (Assam) at Kamachha, Kurukshetra at Kurkukshetra Kund near Asi, and Lake Manasarovar at Mansarovar near Shyameshvara are a part of the city's religious and cultural heritage.

In the sacred geography of India Varanasi is known as the "microcosm of India". In addition to its 3,300 Hindu religious places, Varanasi has 12 churches, three Jain mandirs, nine Buddhist shrines, three Gurdwaras (Sikh shrines), and 1,388 Muslim holy places.

== Hinduism ==
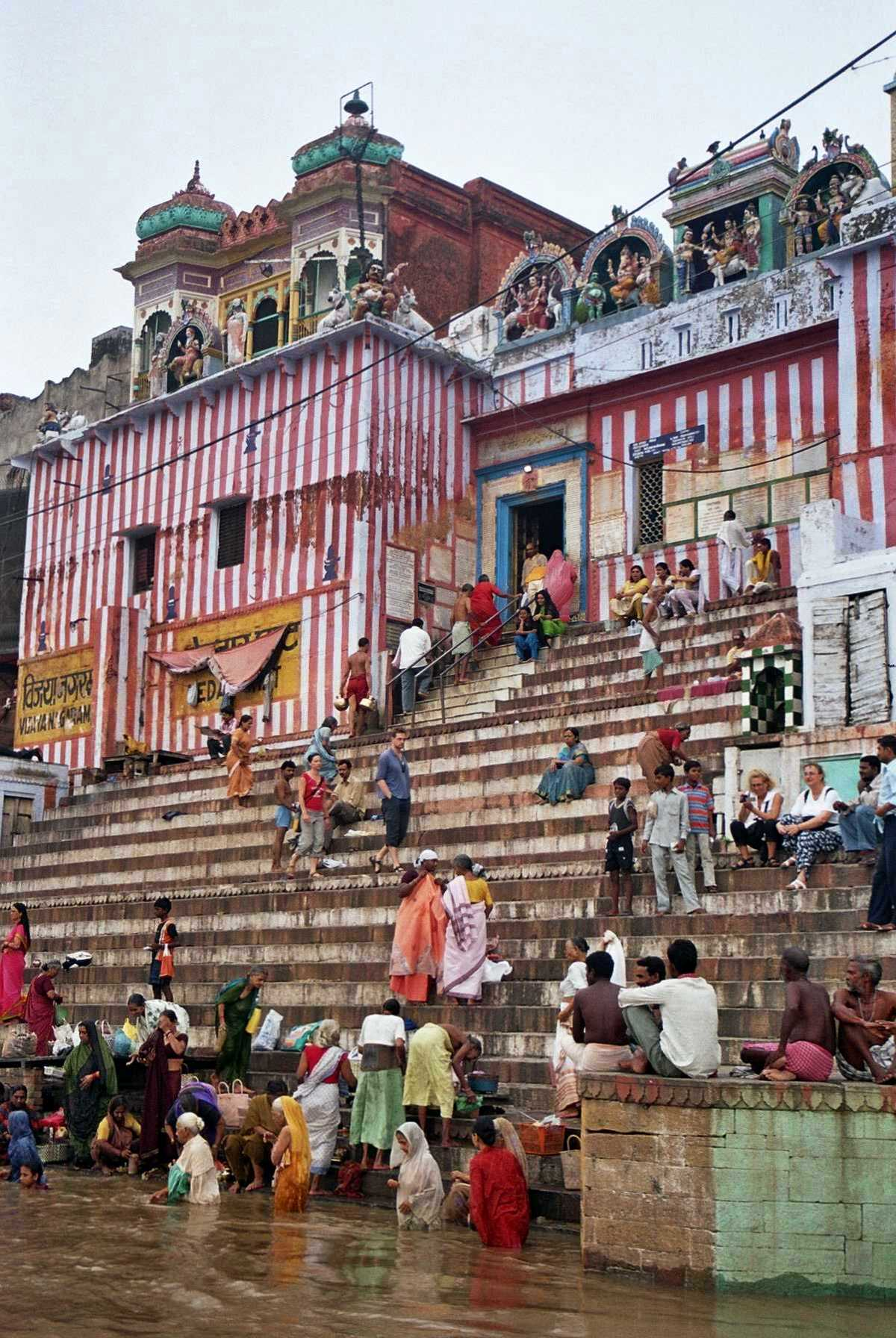
People performing Hindu ceremony at Kedar ghats of Varanasi

Kashi (a name popular with Hindu pilgrims for the city of Varanasi) is one of the holiest cities and centres of pilgrimage for Hindus of all denominations. It is one of the seven holiest cities (Sapta Puri) in Hinduism, and is considered by the faith as the giver of salvation (moksha). Over 50,0Brahmins live in Kashi, providing religious services to the masses. Hindus believe that bathing in the Ganges remits sins and that dying in Kashi ensures release of a person's soul from the cycle of its transmigration. Thus, many Hindus come here to die. In 2001, Hindus made up approximately 84% of the population of Varanasi district.

As the home to the Kashi Vishwanath Temple Jyotirlinga, the city is especially sacred for followers of Shaivism. Kashi is also a Shakta pitha, where the temple to goddess Vishalakshi stands, believed to be the location where the goddess Sati's earrings fell. Hindus of the Shakti sect make a pilgrimage to the city because they regard the Ganges itself to be the goddess Shakti. Adi Shankara wrote his commentaries on Hinduism here, and his efforts lead to the great Hindu revival as at that time Buddhism was widely practiced.

== Jainism ==
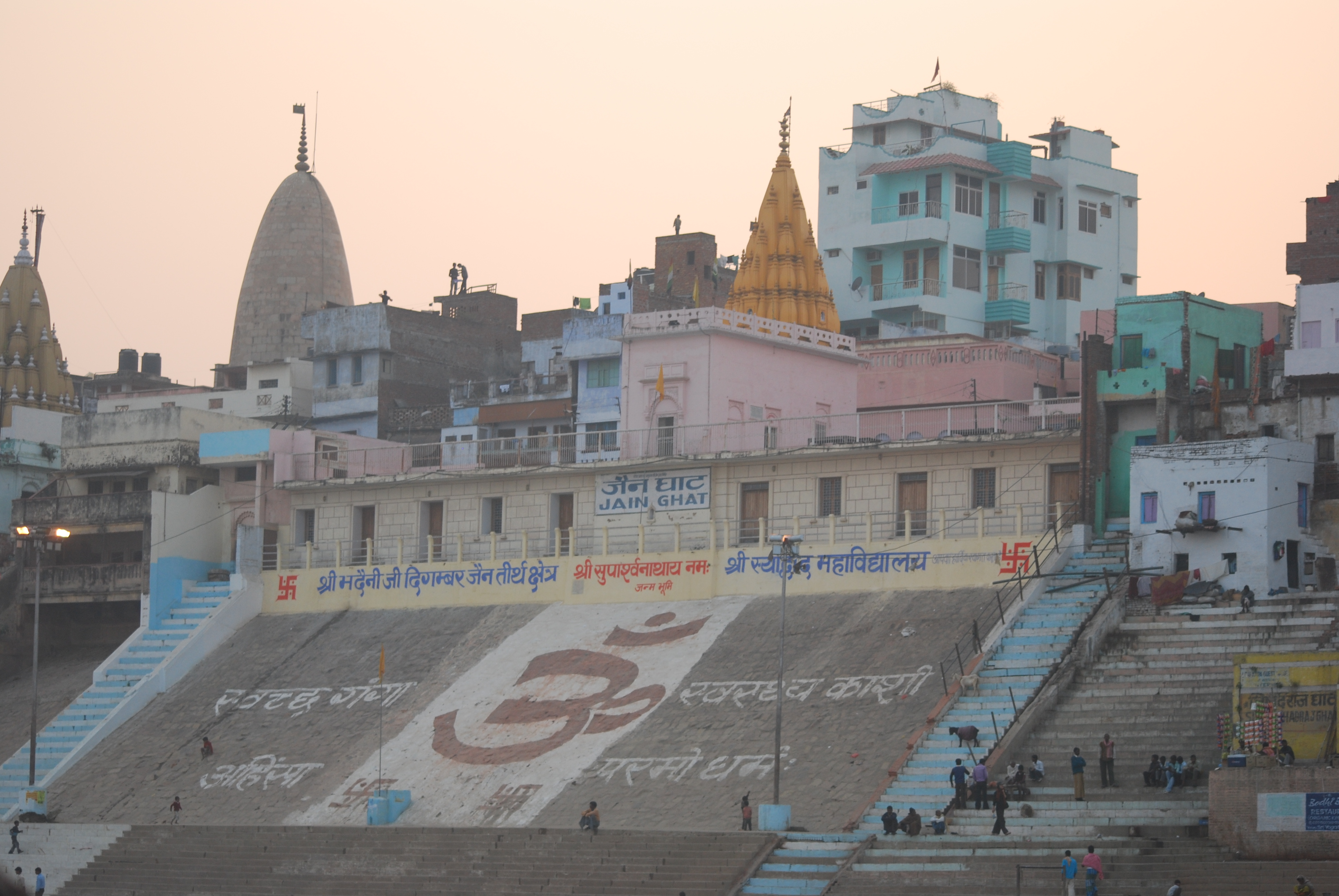
Jain Ghat

Varanasi is a pilgrimage site or tirtha (holy place) for Jains, as four of their Tirthankaras were born here during the 8th century BC. In the 8th century BC, Parsvanatha, the 23rd Tirthankara, was born near Bhelupur in Varanasi, now identified with the Parshvanatha Jain temple; he propounded the triad-principle of the Mahavratas (great vows) – ahimsa ("non-violence"), asteya ("non-stealing") and aparigraha ("non-accumulation"). During archaeological excavations at this site, many Jain images were excavated which dated to the 9th–11th centuries BC, while a few images date to the 5th century BC. After Parsvanatha, Mahavira came here in the 6th century BC. It is also said to be the birthplace of Suparshvanatha though the exact location of his birth is not known. It is believed that the present Jain temple in Sarnath, near the Dhamekh Stupa, commemorates the birthplace of Shreyansnatha, the 11th Thirthankara who was born in the village of Simhapur. At Simhapur, there are two Jain temples, one of Svetamabara and the other of Digambara.

== Islam ==
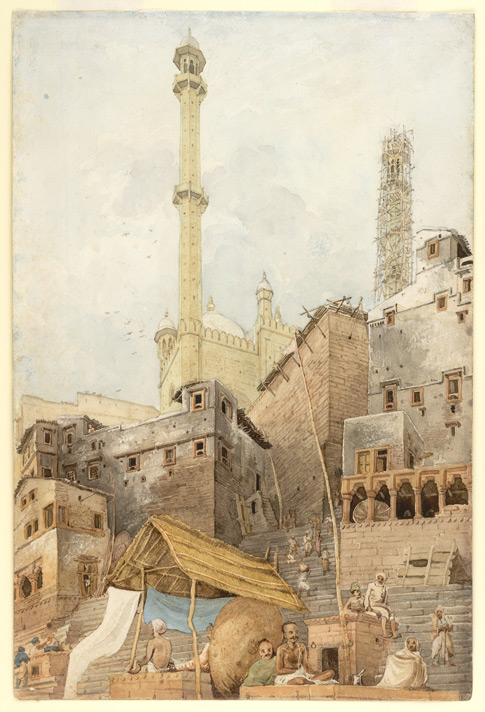
Construction of the Mosque of Aurangzeb near the bank of the Ganges at Varanasi.

Approximately 250,000 Muslims reside in Varanasi. In 2001, they made up approximately 18% of the population of Varanasi district, and 29.7% of the city's population. Muslim settlement and influence began here following the invasion by Mohammad Ghaznavi (1021–1030 AD). The Muslim sacred places in the city are of seven categories which comprise 415 mosques (masjid), 299 religious cultural sites called mazars, 197 crossings where the taziya procession crosses (known as imamchauks), 88 burial places called talaya, 11 special locations for prayer known as idgah, three sites for burying the taziyas, and 375 other religious sites.

== Christianity ==
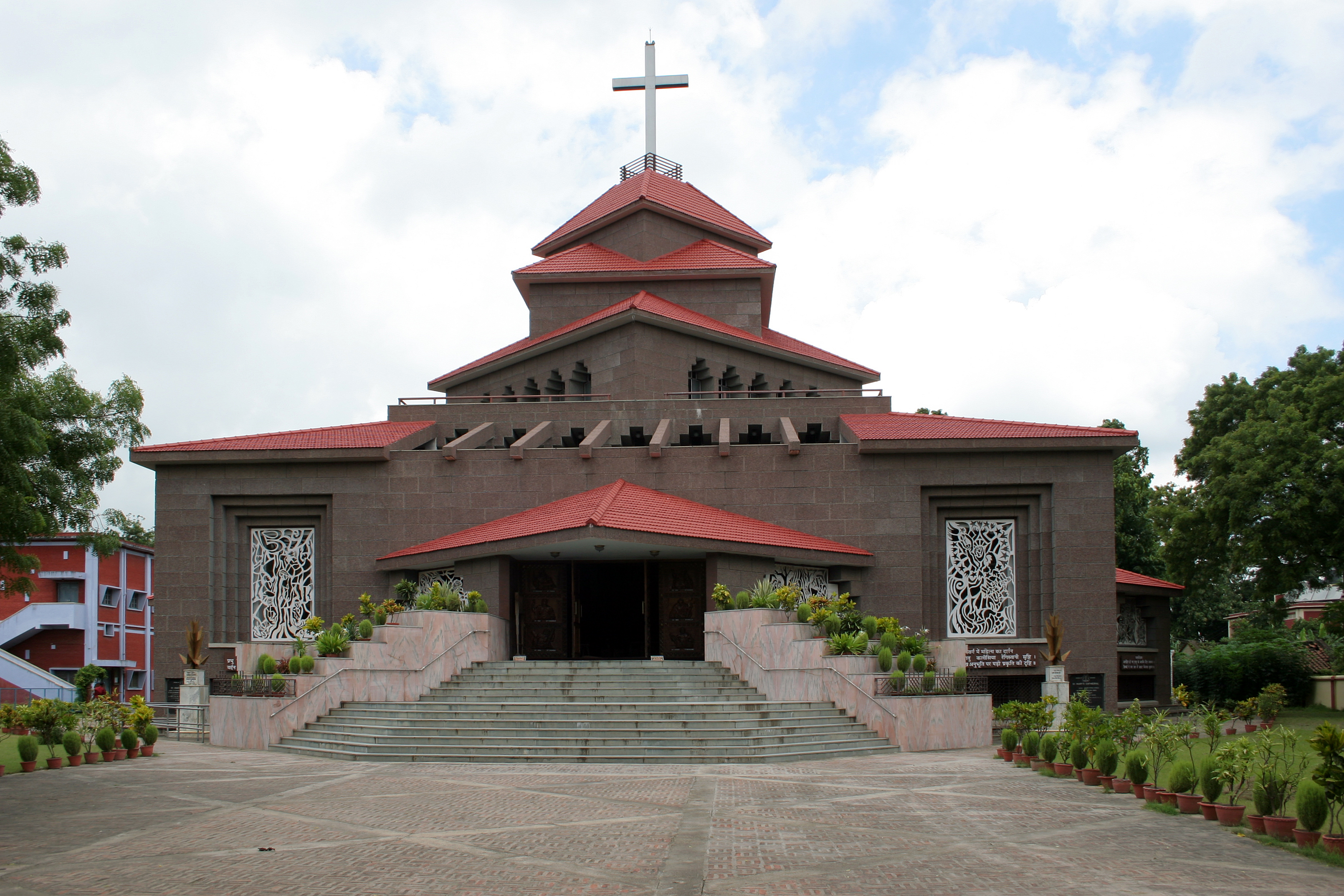
St. Mary's Cathedral, Varanasi

In the 18th century under Warren Hastings's British administration, the city was under the East India Company. During this time, the company purposely promoted learning of Sanskrit and Hindu theology by instituting the Sanskrit School in 1791 to create a conducive climate to establish Christianity in the city, propagating Christian dogmas. In 1830, the first English Seminary, named Anglo-Indian Seminary, was instituted and Christian missionaries came to preach but it had no impact on the upper caste Hindus. It was only the lower class of the society, that too the untouchables, who embraced Christianity. However, with the end of British rule, Christianity did not expand any further in Varanasi. The city has 22 churches. The Latin Catholic Diocese of Varanasi (Latin: Varanasien(sis)) is located in the city under the ecclesiastical province of Agra. St. Mary's Cathedral is notable.

Under the Church of North India, which is the dominant United Protestant denomination in northern India, the Diocese of Lucknow, with its headquarters at Allahabad, has territorial jurisdiction also over Varanasi. Under this diocese, the St Thomas Church in Godowlia, in the heart of the Hindu dominated area of the city, is an ancient Protestant church, the location of which is said to be the place where St. Thomas had visited to preach in 52 AD. Father Stevens of the church believes that the church's brick structure is dated to a period earlier than 1700 AD. The church rises to a height of 60 feet (18 m). The church has been repainted recently with the traditional colours of light yellow and white, typical of Protestant churches.

== Others ==
At the 2001 census, persons of other religions or no religion made up 0.4% of the population of Varanasi district.

=== Buddhism ===
Sarnath, a suburb of Varanasi, is a place of Buddhist pilgrimage. It is the site of the deer park where Gautama Buddha is said to have given his first sermon about the basic principles of Buddhism. The Dhamek Stupa is one of the few pre-Ashokan stupas still in existence, though only its foundation remains. Also remaining is the Chaukhandi Stupa commemorating the spot where Buddha met his first disciples in the 5th century.

=== Sikhism ===
Guru Nanak came to Varanasi on two occasions. He came in 1502 as a young man on a pilgrimage. In 1506, he came for religious interaction with the sages of Banaras when he preached his dogma of Sikhism on the Maha Shivaratri festival day. The 9th Guru Tegh Bahadur (1664–1675) came to Varanasi in 1666 and the place where he resided is called Asu Bhairava Sangar (Nichibagh), which was also the place where Guru Gobind Singh the 10th and the last Guru also stayed. Gobind Singh had deputed five of his disciples to a school in Varanasi to learn Sanskrit and this school is still continuing; this is named as Guru Nanak Sanskrit Vidyalaya in Bisheshvarganj. Other notable religious places of the community are three sacred sites known as Sangats, and a monastery at Ramnagar which is stated to possess an original copy of the Guru Granth Sahib. There is also a grand Gurudwara near Augharnath-ka-Takia. A majority of Sikhs here are migrants from West Punjab in Pakistan who settled here after India's partition in 1947. The population of Sikhs was reported to be around 5,000.

== Groups ==
Dalits encompass 13% of Varanasi's population. Most dalits are followers of Guru Ravidass. Shri Guru Ravidass Janam Asthan is an important place of pilgrimage for Ravidasis from all around India.

== Festivals ==
=== Hindu festivals ===
On Mahashivaratri (February), a Hindu festival, a procession of Shiva proceeds from the Mahamrityunjaya Temple to the Kashi Vishwanath Temple. Dhrupad Mela is a five-day musical festival devoted to dhrupad style held at Tulsi Ghat in February–March. The Sankat Mochan Hanuman Temple celebrates Hanuman Jayanti (March–April), the birthday of Hanuman. A special puja, aarti, and a public procession is organized. Starting in 1923, the temple organizes a five-day classical music and dance concert festival titled Sankat Mochan Sangeet Samaroh in this period, when iconic artists from all parts of India are invited to perform.

The Ramlila of Ramnagar is a dramatic enactment of Rama's legend, as told in Ramacharitamanasa. The plays, sponsored by Kashi Naresh, are performed in Ramnagar every evening for 31 days. On the last day, the festivities reach a crescendo as Rama vanquishes the demon king Ravana. Kashi Naresh Udit Narayan Singh started this tradition around 1830.

Chhath Puja is celebrated on the sixth day of the lunar month of Kartika (October–November). The rituals are observed over four days. They include holy bathing, fasting and abstaining from drinking water (vrata), standing in water, and offering prasad (prayer offerings) and arghya to the setting and rising sun. Some devotees also perform a prostration march as they head for the river banks. Chhath puja is dedicated to the sun god "Surya" and his sister "Chhathi Maiya". Chhath is considered as Mahaparva by the Bhojpuri people. It is said that the Chhath Mahaparva was started in Varanasi.

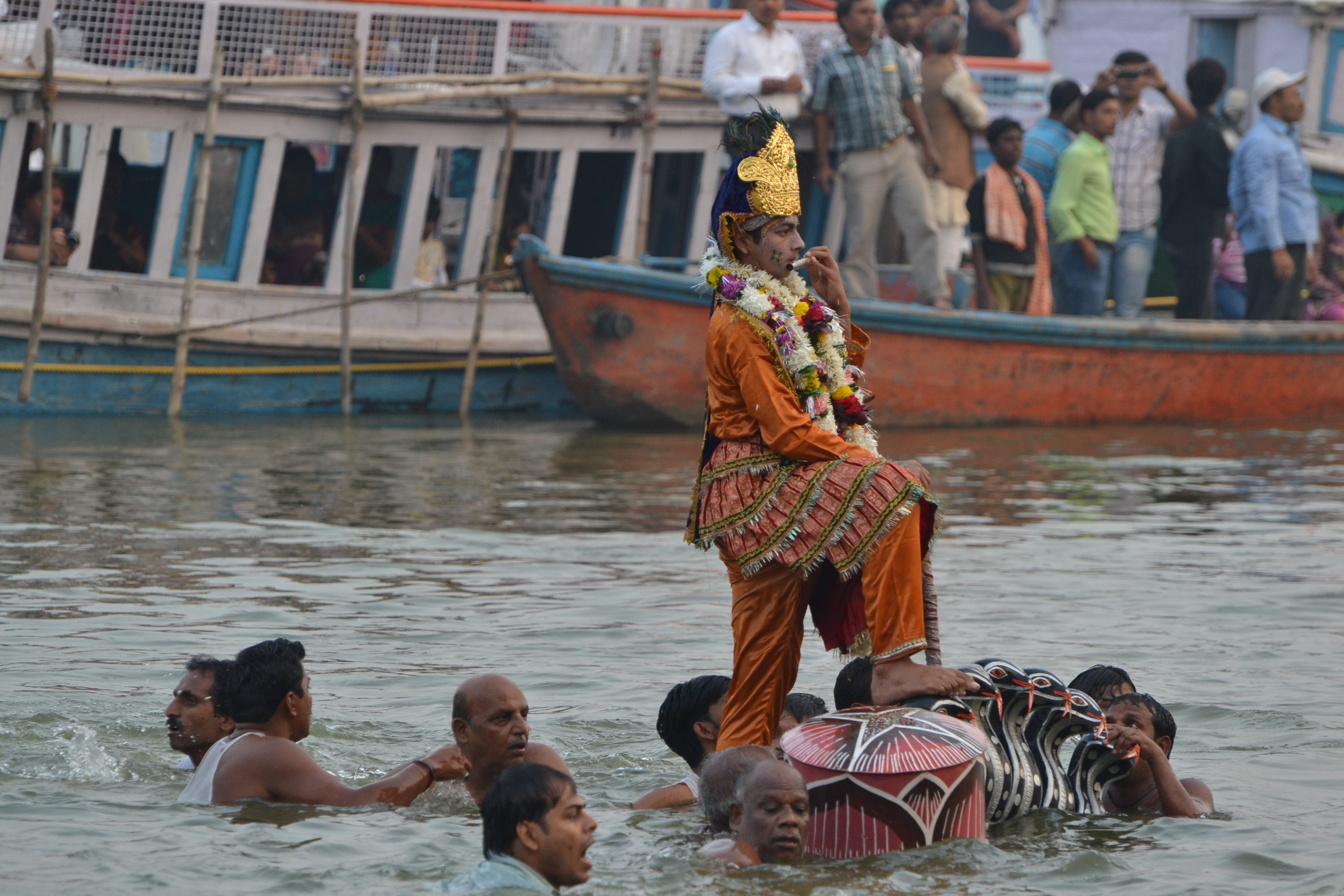
Krishna standing on serpent Kaliya during Nag Nathaiya festival in Varanasi

Nag Nathaiya, celebrated on the fourth lunar day of the dark fortnight of the Hindu month of Kartik (October–November), that commemorates the victory of Krishna over the serpent Kaliya. On this occasion, a large Kadamba tree (Neolamarckia cadamba) branch is planted on the banks of the Ganges so that a boy acting the role of Krishna can jump into the river on to the effigy representing Kaliya. He stands over the effigy in a dancing pose playing the flute; the effigy and the boy standing on it are given a swirl in front of the audience. People watch the display standing on the banks of the river or from boats. Bharat Milap celebrates the meeting of Rama and his younger brother Bharata after the return of the former after 14 years of exile. It is celebrated during October–November, a day after the festival of Vijayadashami. Kashi Naresh attends this festival in his regal attire. The festival attracts a large number of devotees.

Ganga Mahotsav is a five-day music festival organized by the Uttar Pradesh Tourism Department, held in November–December culminating a day before Kartik Poornima (Dev Deepawali). On Kartik Poornima, also called the Ganges festival, the Ganges is venerated by arti offered by thousands of pilgrims who release lighted lamps to float in the river from the ghats.

=== Muslim festivals ===
Every year, the primary Muslim festivals celebrated in the city are the ld-ul-fitr' (Ramzan), Bakrid, Shab-e-Barat, Bara Wafat and Muharram. Additional festivals include Alvida and Chehlum. A non-religious festival observed by Muslims is Ghazi-miyan-ka-byaha ("the marriage of Ghazi Miyan").

== Bibliography ==
- Gupta, Shobhna (2003). Monuments of India. Har-Anand Publications. p. 11. ISBN 978-81-241-0926-7.
- (India), Uttar Pradesh (1965). Uttar Pradesh district gazetteers. Govt. of Uttar Pradesh.
- Jacobsen, Knut A. (2013). Pilgrimage in the Hindu Tradition: Salvific Space. Routledge. ISBN 978-0-415-59038-9.
- Kramrisch, Stella (1946). The Hindu Temple. Motilal Banarsidass. ISBN 978-81-208-0223-0.
- Mellor, Ronald; Podany, Amanda H. (2005). The World in Ancient Times: Primary Sources and Reference Volume. Oxford University Press. ISBN 978-0-19-522220-3.
- Mitra, Swati (2002). Good Earth Varanasi City Guide. Eicher Goodearth Limited. ISBN 978-81-87780-04-5.
- Pintchman, Tracy (2005). Guests at God's Wedding: Celebrating Kartik among the Women of Benares. SUNY Press. ISBN 978-0-7914-8256-8.
- Shackley, Myra (2001). Managing Sacred Sites: Service Provision and Visitor Experience. Cengage Learning EMEA. ISBN 978-1-84480-107-7.
- Singh, Rana (2 October 2009). Banaras: Making of India's Heritage City. Cambridge Scholars Publishing. ISBN 978-1-4438-1579-6.
- Sukul, Kuber Nath (1974). Varanasi Down The Ages. Kameshwar Nath Sukul.
- Vera, Zak (2010). Invisible River: Sir Richard's Last Mission. AuthorHouse. ISBN 978-1-4389-0020-9.
- Wilder-Smith, Annelies; Shaw, Marc; Schwartz, Eli (2012). Travel Medicine: Tales Behind the Science. Routledge. ISBN 978-0-08-045359-0.
