= Hole in My Soul =

1997 single by Aerosmith

Single by Aerosmith

from the album Nine Lives
- B-side: "Falling Off"
- Released: May 11, 1997
- Length: 6:10
- Label: Columbia
- Songwriters: Steven Tyler; Joe Perry; Desmond Child
- Producer: Kevin Shirley

Aerosmith singles chronology
"Falling in Love (Is Hard on the Knees)" (1997)	"Hole in My Soul" (1997)	"Pink" (1997)

Music video
- "Hole in My Soul" on YouTube

"Hole in My Soul" is a song by American hard rock band Aerosmith. It was written by Steven Tyler, Joe Perry, and professional songwriter and longtime Aerosmith collaborator Desmond Child. It was released as the second single from Nine Lives in May 1997. The song reached number 51 on the US Billboard Hot 100, number four on the Billboard Mainstream Rock Tracks chart, and number 10 in Canada.

== Music video ==
Directed by Andy Morahan, the video featured a nerdy high school student (played by Branden Williams), often picked on, who is unsuccessful in finding the right girl. He uses his scientific genius to build a cloning machine and creates a beautiful girl (played by Eva Mendes), but she meets someone else at a party. He creates another who he also loses to a football player (played by Seann William Scott). A classmate (played by Alexandra Holden) discovers his machine and stops him from creating another girl for himself, and he realizes the girl for him had been there all along.

== Live performances ==
In concert, Steven Tyler has been known to substitute some lines with racier lyrics. On a live version of the song from the A Little South of Sanity album, Tyler sings "I fuck with my boots on cause you fuck with my head" instead of the studio version lyrics "I sleep with my boots on, but you're still in my head." The band played the song heavily on their Nine Lives Tour from 1997 to 1999, but they have rarely played it since.

== Track listings ==
UK CD1
No.	Title	Length
1.	"Hole in My Soul" (LP version)	6:10
2.	"Falling in Love (Is Hard on the Knees)" (Butcher mix)	4:37
3.	"Falling in Love (Is Hard on the Knees)" (Moby Flawed mix)	4:58
4.	"Nine Lives" (live)	4:07

UK CD2
No.	Title	Length
1.	"Hole in My Soul" (album version)	6:13
2.	"Falling in Love (Is Hard on the Knees)" (Moby Flawed mix)	5:58
3.	"Falling in Love (Is Hard on the Knees)" (live)	3:18
4.	"Walk This Way" (live)	4:04

== Charts ==
=== Weekly charts ===
Chart (1997)	Peak position
Australia (ARIA)	145
Canada Top Singles (RPM)	10
Europe (Eurochart Hot 100)	72
Germany (GfK)	75
Iceland (Íslenski Listinn Topp 40)	15
Scottish Singles Sales (Official Charts)	28
UK Singles (Official Charts)	29
UK Rock & Metal (Official Charts)	2
US Billboard Hot 100	51
US Mainstream Rock (Billboard)	4

=== Year-end charts ===
Chart (1997)	Position
US Mainstream Rock Tracks (Billboard)	33

== Release history ==
Region	Date	Format(s)	Label(s)	Ref.
United States	May 6, 1997	Contemporary hit radio	Columbia	
United Kingdom	June 9, 1997	7-inch vinyl; CD	Columbia	
Japan	June 11, 1997	CD	Sony	
