= Nine Lives (Aerosmith album) =

Studio album by Aerosmith
- Released: March 18, 1997
- Recorded: September–November 1996
- Studios: Avatar, New York City; The Boneyard; The Hit Factory (New York City)
- Genres: Hard rock; blues rock
- Length: 62:54
- Label: Columbia
- Producers: Kevin Shirley; Aerosmith

Aerosmith chronology
Get a Grip (1993)	Nine Lives (1997)	Just Push Play (2001)

Alternative cover
- Original album cover, replaced due to controversy

Singles from Nine Lives
- 1. "Falling in Love (Is Hard on the Knees)" Released: February 11, 1997; 2. "Hole in My Soul" Released: August 5, 1997; 3. "Pink" Released: November 18, 1997; 4. "Full Circle" Released: December 9, 1997 (EU/Japan)

Nine Lives is the twelfth studio album by American rock band Aerosmith, released on March 18, 1997. The album was produced by Aerosmith and Kevin Shirley, and was the band's first studio album released by Columbia Records since 1982's Rock in a Hard Place. In the United States, it peaked at number one on the Billboard 200 and sold over two million copies. One of the album's singles, "Pink", won a Grammy Award for Best Rock Performance by a Duo or Group with Vocal.

== Production ==
Early recordings took place at Criteria Studios in Miami, Florida, where the band worked with producer Glen Ballard. There, Steven Tyler and Ballard co-wrote the lyrics for "Falling in Love (Is Hard on the Knees)", "Taste of India" and "Pink". Other collaborators, including Desmond Child and Taylor Rhodes, joined Tyler and guitarist Joe Perry to write songs. Child previously collaborated with Aerosmith on such hits as "Angel", "Crazy" and "Dude (Looks like a Lady)".

Only a week before rehearsals, drummer Joey Kramer was suffering from depression, having grieved the loss of his father a few years prior. With Kramer unavailable, rumors began to circulate that the band would disband. Steve Ferrone was brought in to play drums until Kramer was able to return. "I came back with a nice perspective on what I bring to the table in Aerosmith," Kramer reflected. "That was healthy for me. We ended up rerecording because people were listening to the tracks and were saying some negative stuff about it and saying the band didn't sound the same."

Originally set for a summer release in 1996, the album was delayed, because Columbia Records felt dissatisfied with the nine tracks that Aerosmith and Ballard had produced. Further issues occurred in July that year, when the band asked their manager Tim Collins to step down after almost twelve years of partnership. In his 2014 autobiography Rocks: My Life In and Out of Aerosmith, Perry recounted that Aerosmith felt betrayed by Collins, as he would pit the members against one another. With their longtime manager gone, the band decided to hire in-house producer Kevin Shirley, and set up at Avatar Studios in New York City. Shirley, who had also worked with Journey, helped with the album's overtones and instruments, particularly the guitar sounds. In a 1997 MTV special promoting the making of Nine Lives, Tyler declared: "He's got it somewhere stuck between Toys in the Attic and Rocks."

The new sessions began in September 1996, and continued to November. Following the shift in production, Kramer recovered from his depression, and returned to the studio. Instead of playing his tracks over Ferrone's, the band rerecorded from scratch on all of the completed tracks with Kramer. John Kalodner, Columbia's A&R executive was brought back to supervise the project, after he had been pushed off the production in Florida by Collins. He helped trim the twenty-four songs that had been written to thirteen. Initially, the band called the album "Vindaloo" after adding in elements of Indian music throughout some of the songs, including a sarangi intro by Ramesh Mishra on the song, "Taste of India". But upon completing the track "Nine Lives", the band felt that would make the perfect title, serving as a metaphor for the album's troubled conception.

== Artwork ==
The booklet for Nine Lives contains 12 pieces of album art (including the cover). Each picture contains a smaller version of the previous picture within itself. The final picture is included in the first, creating an infinite loop. It was designed by Stefan Sagmeister.

The original cover art, inspired by a painting in a book by A. C. Bhaktivedanta Swami Prabhupada, features Lord Krishna (with a cat's head and female breasts) dancing on the head of the snake demon, Kāliyā. The Hindu community protested, feeling the artwork was offensive. The band had been unaware of the source of the artwork, and the record company apologized, leading to the next prints removing the art from the cover and booklet. The new cover features a cat tied to a circus knife-thrower's wheel.

== Tour ==
The Nine Lives tour was the band's longest tour in its history, it saw them perform in North America, Japan, and most of Europe on several legs. It was delayed numerous times due to injuries to Steven Tyler and Joey Kramer. The tour began in May 1997 and extended well into 1999, due to the success of the 1998 single "I Don't Want to Miss a Thing". The song was recorded for the 1998 film Armageddon, which starred Steven Tyler's actress daughter Liv Tyler, and became Aerosmith's first and only song to top the Billboard 100 chart. To fulfil an earlier contract with Geffen and capitalize on the momentum of "I Don't Want to Miss a Thing", the band released a live compilation album in October 1998 titled A Little South of Sanity. This album included live tracks from the tour that were recorded in 1997–98, along with a few earlier live tracks from the Get a Grip tour in 1994. For the Nine Lives tour, the band often performed alongside newer, more contemporary bands like Candlebox, Monster Magnet, Seven Mary Three, Skunk Anansie and Talk Show. For a run of summer European shows in 1998, their opening act was scheduled to be Faith No More (who they had earlier shared a bill with in 1990), but this never came to fruition, since Faith No More announced their split on April 20, 1998, a few months before the shows, which were set to begin on July 1, 1998.

== Reception ==
Professional ratings
Review scores
Source	Rating
AllMusic	2.5/5 stars
Christgau’s Consumer Guide	(neither)
Collector's Guide to Heavy Metal	8/10
The Encyclopedia of Popular Music	4/5 stars
Entertainment Weekly	B−
Now	3/5 stars
Q	4/5 stars
Rolling Stone	3/5 stars
Spin	5/10
The Sydney Morning Herald	3/5 stars

In his AllMusic review, Stephen Thomas Erlewine compared Nine Lives to previous Aerosmith albums stating, “Nine Lives, in contrast, is overlabored, with Aerosmith making a conscious effort to sound hip and vibrant, which ironically simply makes them sound tired." He also criticized the album's troubled production saying, "Not only are the performances perfunctory, but the songs aren't catchy -- no matter how hard it tries, 'Falling in Love (Is Hard on the Knees)' never develops a hook, and it is not an exception". Spin reviewer remarked that "Aerosmith doesn't really make albums anymore, they make soundtracks for videos" and called the album "conformable, energetic, generic." Elysa Gardner from Rolling Stone was more favorable in her 1997 review concluding, "For those who simply can't abide a collection of Aerosmith tunes without its share of power ballads, Nine Lives doesn't disappoint".

== Outtakes ==
Some releases of Nine Lives feature different track listings, most notably the two Japanese editions which both feature the song "Fall Together". The song was included as a B-side on the album's first single "Falling in Love (Is Hard on the Knees)". The track "What Kind of Love Are You On" was originally titled "What Kind of Lover You Want", and was one of many outtakes left from the recording sessions in Florida. The song was re-titled "What Kind of Love Are You On" and features in the 1998 movie Armageddon, as well as its associated soundtrack. The track was later featured on the European re-release of the album's third single "Pink". Unfinished tracks that were discarded during the recording sessions in Florida include, "Bacon Biscuit Blues", "Bridges Are Burning", "Heart of Passion", "Loretta", and "Trouble". Tyler also mentioned a song called "Where the Sun Never Shines" during an MTV interview shortly after the album's release.

== Track listing ==
Nine Lives track listing
No.	Title	Writer(s)	Length
1.	"Nine Lives"	Steven Tyler, Joe Perry, Marti Frederiksen	4:01
2.	"Falling in Love (Is Hard on the Knees)"	Tyler, Perry, Glen Ballard	3:26
3.	"Hole in My Soul"	Tyler, Perry, Desmond Child	6:10
4.	"Taste of India"	Tyler, Perry, Ballard	5:53
5.	"Full Circle"	Tyler, Taylor Rhodes	5:01
6.	"Something's Gotta Give"	Tyler, Perry, Frederiksen	3:37
7.	"Ain't That a Bitch"	Tyler, Perry, Child	5:25
8.	"The Farm"	Tyler, Perry, Mark Hudson, Steve Dudas	4:27
9.	"Crash"	Tyler, Perry, Hudson, Dominic Miller	4:26
10.	"Kiss Your Past Good-Bye"	Tyler, Hudson	4:32
11.	"Pink"	Tyler, Richard Supa, Ballard	3:55
12.	"Attitude Adjustment"	Tyler, Perry, Frederiksen	3:45
13.	"Fallen Angels"	Tyler, Perry, Supa	8:16
Total length:			62:54

International bonus tracks
No.	Title	Writer(s)	Length
12.	"Falling Off"	Tyler, Perry, Frederiksen	3:02
13.	"Attitude Adjustment"	Tyler, Perry, Frederiksen	3:45
14.	"Fallen Angels"	Tyler, Perry, Supa	8:18

Japanese bonus tracks
No.	Title	Writer(s)	Length
14.	"Falling Off"	Tyler, Perry, Frederiksen	3:02
15.	"Fall Together"	Tyler, Hudson, Greg Wells, Dean Grakal	4:38

Alternate Japanese bonus tracks
No.	Title	Writer(s)	Length
12.	"Falling Off"	Tyler, Perry, Frederiksen	3:02
13.	"Fall Together"	Tyler, Hudson, Greg Wells, Dean Grakal	4:38
14.	"Attitude Adjustment"	Tyler, Perry, Frederiksen	3:45
15.	"Fallen Angels"	Tyler, Perry, Supa	8:18

South American version and European re-release bonus tracks
No.	Title	Writer(s)	Length
12.	"Falling Off"	Tyler, Perry, Frederiksen	3:02
13.	"Attitude Adjustment"	Tyler, Perry, Frederiksen	3:45
14.	"Fallen Angels"	Tyler, Perry, Supa	8:18
15.	"I Don't Want to Miss a Thing"	Diane Warren	4:56
Total length:			70:49

== Personnel ==
Aerosmith

- Steven Tyler – lead vocals, keyboards, piano, hammer dulcimer, percussion, hand organ, harmonica
- Joe Perry – guitar, dulcimer, slide guitar, backing vocals, lead vocals on "Falling Off"
- Brad Whitford – guitar, acoustic guitar
- Tom Hamilton – bass guitar, Chapman Stick
- Joey Kramer – drums

Additional personnel

- David Campbell – arranger, conductor (track 2)
- Ramesh Mishra – sarangi
- John Webster – keyboards, backing vocals
- Suzie Katayama – strings, conductor

Production

- Producers – Kevin Shirley and Aerosmith
- Engineers – Mark Hudson, Joe Perry, Rory Romano, Elliot Scheiner, Kevin Shirley, Steven Tyler
- Second engineer – Rory Romano
- Mixing – Elliot Scheiner, Kevin Shirley
- Mastering – Leon Zervos
- Programming – Sander Selover
- Horn arrangements – David Campbell, Steven Tyler
- String arrangements – David Campbell
- Guitar technicians – Jim Survis
- Guitar technicians (Additional) – Lisa Sharken, Archie Avila
- Drum technician – Andy Gilman
- Production engineer – David Frangioni
- Art direction – Christopher Austopchuk, Gail Marowitz
- Photo art direction – Christopher Austopchuk, Gail Marowitz
- Photography – F. Scott Schafer
- Calligraphy – Jeanne Greco
- Stylist – Fiona Williams-Chappel

Credits verified from the album's liner notes.

== Charts ==
=== Weekly charts ===
Weekly chart performance for Nine Lives
Chart (1997–98)	Peak position
Australian Albums (ARIA)	13
Austrian Albums (Ö3 Austria)	2
Belgian Albums (Ultratop Flanders)	11
Belgian Albums (Ultratop Wallonia)	5
Canadian Albums (Billboard)	2
Danish Albums (Hitlisten)	4
Dutch Albums (Album Top 100)	17
Finnish Albums (Suomen virallinen lista)	1
French Albums (SNEP)	5
German Albums (Offizielle Top 100)	3
Hungarian Albums (MAHASZ)	7
Italian Albums (FIMI)	7
Japanese Albums (Oricon)	3
New Zealand Albums (RMNZ)	14
Norwegian Albums (VG-lista)	6
Scottish Albums (Official Charts)	4
Spanish Albums (AFYVE)	5
Swedish Albums (Sverigetopplistan)	3
Swiss Albums (Schweizer Hitparade)	3
UK Albums (Official Charts)	4
UK Rock & Metal Albums (Official Charts)	1
US Billboard 200	1

=== Year-end charts ===
1997 year-end chart performance for Nine Lives
Chart (1997)	Position
Austrian Albums (Ö3 Austria)	37
Belgian Albums (Ultratop Wallonia)	79
Canadian Albums (Nielsen Soundscan)	42
German Albums (Offizielle Top 100)	43
Swiss Albums (Schweizer Hitparade)	50
US Billboard 200	53

1998 year-end chart performance for Nine Lives
Chart (1998)	Position
Canadian Albums (RPM)	98
US Billboard 200	129

== Certifications ==
Certifications and sales for Nine Lives
Region	Certification	Certified units/sales
Argentina (CAPIF)	Platinum	60,000^{^}
Australia (ARIA)	Gold	35,000^{^}
Austria (IFPI Austria)	Gold	25,000^{*}
Brazil (Pro-Música Brasil)	Platinum	250,000^{*}
Canada (Music Canada)	3× Platinum	300,000^{^}
Central America (CFC)	Gold	
Chile	Gold	15,000
Czech Republic	Gold	15,000
Denmark (IFPI Danmark)	Gold	25,000^{^}
Finland (Musiikkituottajat)	Gold	27,903
Germany (BVMI)	Gold	250,000^{^}
Italy (FIMI)	Gold	50,000^{*}
Japan (RIAJ)	3× Platinum	600,000^{^}
Poland (ZPAV)	Gold	50,000^{*}
Philippines (PARI)	Gold	20,000^{*}
Spain (Promusicae)	Gold	50,000^{^}
Singapore (RIAS)	Gold	7,500^{*}
Switzerland (IFPI Switzerland)	Platinum	50,000^{^}
United Kingdom (BPI)	Gold	100,000^{*}
United States (RIAA)	2× Platinum	2,000,000^{^}
Uruguay (CUD)	Gold	3,000^{^}
Summaries
Europe (IFPI)	Platinum	1,000,000^{*}
^{*} Sales figures based on certification alone.^{^} Shipments figures based on certification alone.

== Awards ==
Grammy Awards

Year	Winner	Category
1998	"Pink"	Grammy Award for Best Rock Performance by a Duo or Group with Vocal
