= Taste of India =

Promotional single by Aerosmith

from the album Nine Lives
- Released: 1997
- Recorded: 1996
- Genre: Raga rock
- Length: 5:53
- Label: Columbia
- Songwriter(s): Steven Tyler; Joe Perry; Glen Ballard
- Producer(s): Kevin Shirley

Aerosmith singles chronology
"Full Circle" (1997)	"Taste of India" (1997)	"I Don't Want to Miss a Thing" (1998)

"Taste of India" is a song by American hard rock band Aerosmith. It was released in 1997 on the band's 12th studio album Nine Lives (1997). It was released as a promotional single to rock radio, where it peaked at #3 on the Mainstream Rock Tracks chart. The song was written by lead singer Steven Tyler, guitarist Joe Perry, and songwriter Glen Ballard. The song, which clocks in at just under six minutes, contains elements of Indian music throughout, along with driving guitar riffs and a heavy backbeat, as well a sarangi intro by Ramesh Mishra, a student of Ravi Shankar. Joe Perry and Brad Whitford both play Stratocasters on this song.

The band stated they got the idea for this song by walking past a restaurant named "Taste of India".

== Live in concert ==
This song had not been played live since the Nine Lives Tour until their concert in Bangalore on Aerosmith World Tour 2007. It was the opening song at the concert, and was played with the Indian flag as a backdrop.
