= Tulsi Ghat =

Historic ghat (riverfront steps) in Varanasi

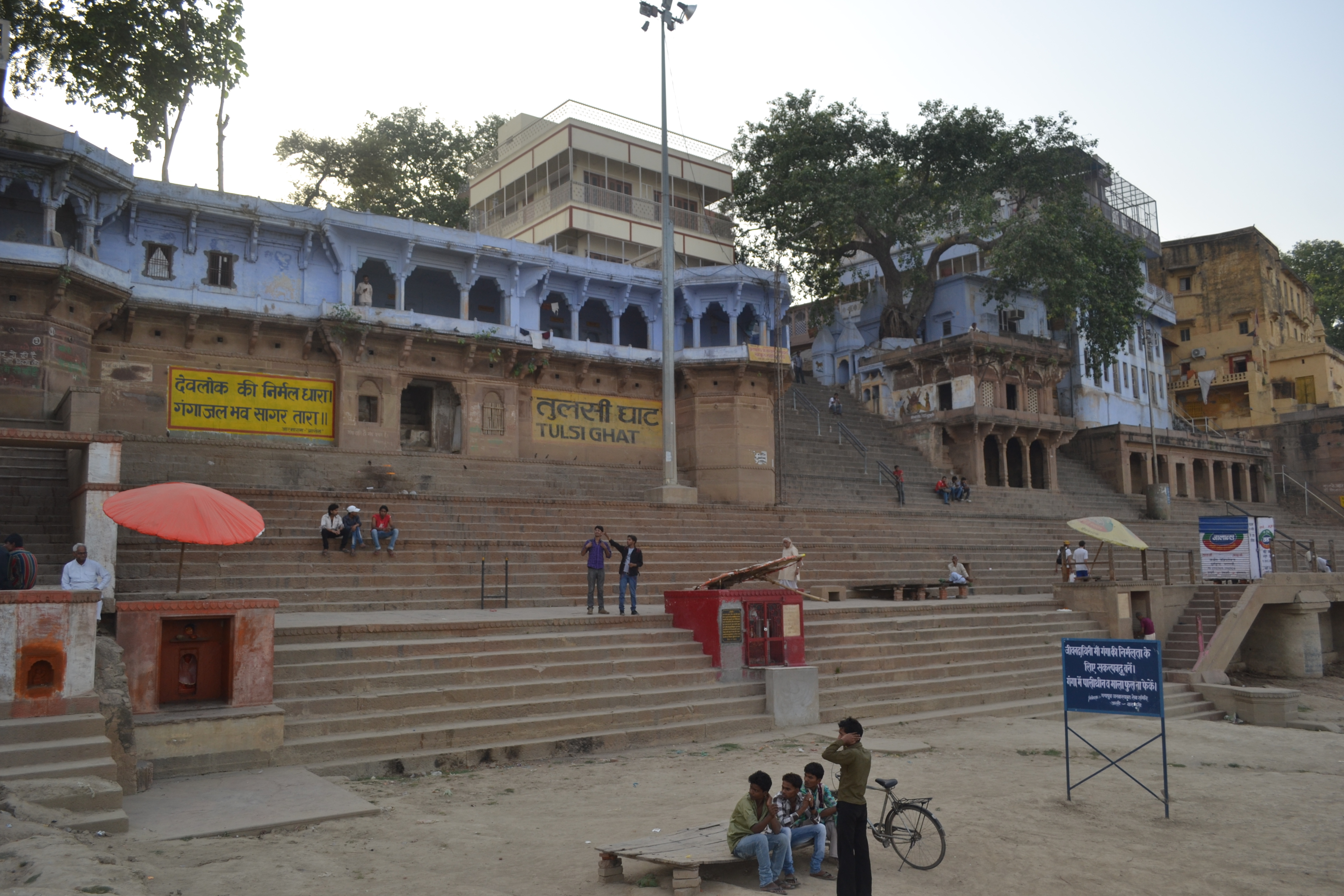

Religion
- Affiliation: Hinduism

Location
- Country: India
- Interactive map of Tulsi Ghat
- Coordinates: 25°17′23.4″N 83°0′23.435″E

Tulsi Ghat is one of the ghats in Varanasi, in India. It is named after poet Tulsidas who lived there while he wrote the Ramcharitmanas and Hanuman Chalisa. Earlier, Tulsi Ghat was known as Lolark Ghat. It was in the year 1941 that Tulsi Ghat was made pucca (cemented) by industrialist, Baldeo Das Birla.

Tulsi Ghat is accessible by boat, and it is possible to hire a private boat tour on the banks of river Ganga in Varanasi that allows to visit all important ghats and watch the sunrise.

== Cultural activities at Tulsi Ghat ==
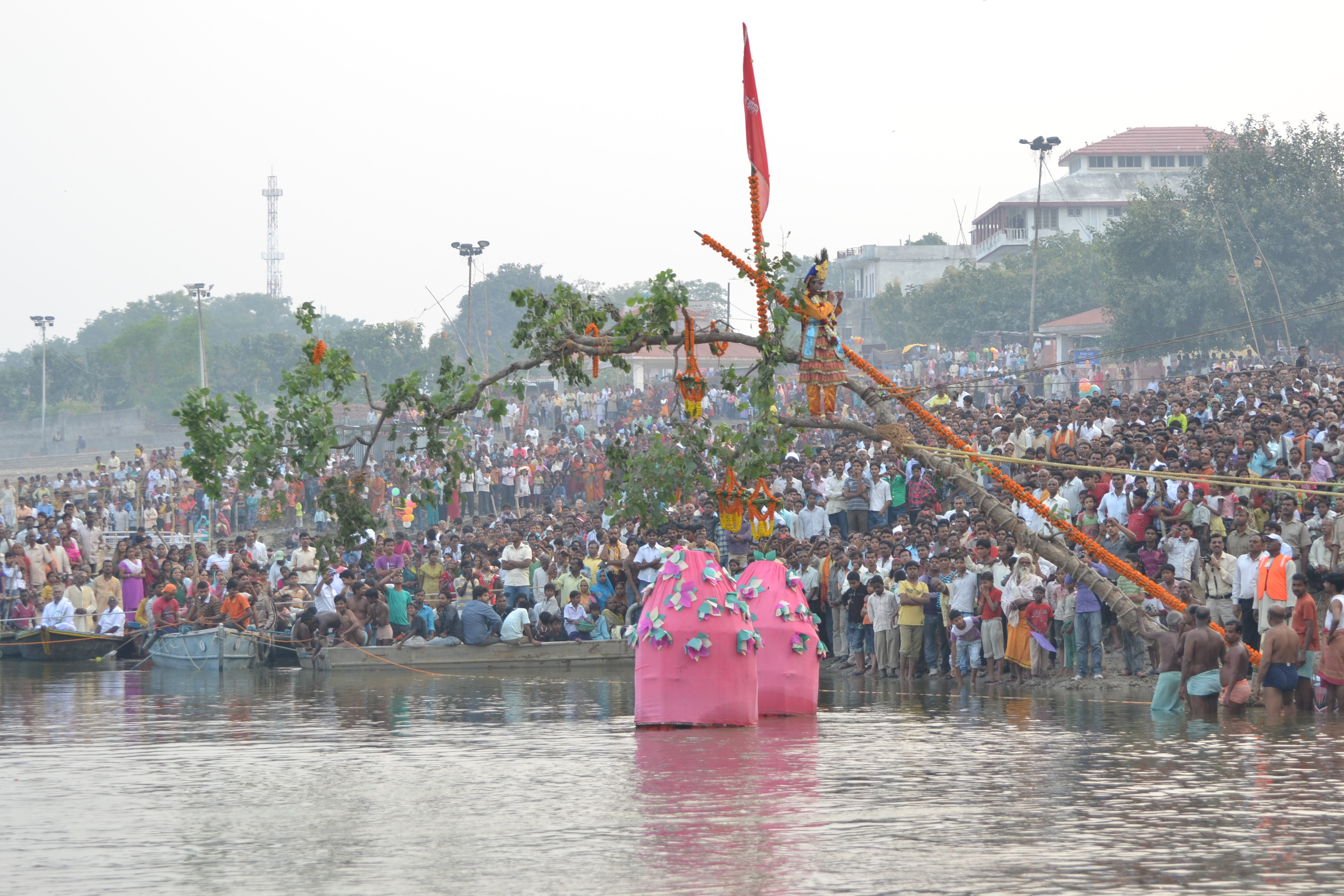
Krishna Standing on Kadamba tree at Nag Nathaiya festival.

Tulsi Ghat is associated with a number of rituals such as Lolark Sasthi at Lolark kunda (performed for the birth and welfare of sons) and a sacred bath to rid oneself of leprosy and skin diseases. The festival of Lolark Sasthi falls on the 6th day of the bright half of Bhadrapad. During the Hindu lunar month of Kartika (October–November), the Krishna Lila, a play about the lila of Krishna (Nag Nathaiya), is staged here.

== Burglary ==
In December 2011 the copy of the Ramcharitmanas written by Tulsidas was stolen from the Hanuman temple on Tulsi Ghat. The Awadhi language manuscript had been in the temple since 1701 after having been discovered in 1623.
