= I Don't Want to Miss a Thing (album) =

Studio album by Mark Chesnutt
- Released: February 9, 1999
- Recorded: 1998
- Studio: Big Javelina and Ocean Way Nashville (Nashville, Tennessee); Sound Kitchen (Franklin, Tennessee)
- Genre: Country
- Length: 33:40
- Label: Decca
- Producer: Mark Wright

Mark Chesnutt chronology
Thank God for Believers (1997)	I Don't Want to Miss a Thing (1999)	Lost in the Feeling (2000)

Singles from I Don't Want to Miss a Thing
- 1. "I Don't Want to Miss a Thing" Released: December 1, 1998; 2. "This Heartache Never Sleeps" Released: April 14, 1999

Professional ratings
Review scores
Source	Rating
AllMusic	4/5 stars
Entertainment Weekly	B

I Don't Want to Miss a Thing is the eighth studio album by American country music artist Mark Chesnutt, released in 1999. His last album for the Decca Records label, I Don't Want to Miss a Thing produced two singles on the Billboard Hot Country Songs charts, including a cover of the Diane Warren song of the same name, which reached Number One on the country charts, becoming the final Number One of his career thus far. The cover was also Chesnutt's biggest crossover, reaching Top 20 on the Billboard Hot 100. Only one other single was released from the album: "This Heartache Never Sleeps", which reached #17 on the country charts.

== Track listing ==
No.	Title	Writer(s)	Length
1.	"I Don't Want to Miss a Thing" (Aerosmith cover)	Diane Warren	4:06
2.	"This Heartache Never Sleeps"	Daryl Burgess, Tim Johnson	3:48
3.	"My Way Back Home"	Mark Nesler, Tony Martin	3:21
4.	"I'll Get You Back"	Ron Harbin, Aimee Mayo, Dusty Drake	3:11
5.	"That's the Way You Make an Ex"	Roger Springer, Reese Wilson, Martin	2:53
6.	"Tonight I'll Let My Memory Take Me Home"	Springer, Robert Arthur, Dean Dillon	3:29
7.	"Jolie"	Skip Ewing, Paul Overstreet, Paul Davis	3:09
8.	"What Was You Thinking?"	Doug Johnson, Springer	3:23
9.	"I'm Gone"	Rick Orozco, Marv Green	3:05
10.	"Let's Talk About Our Love"	Mark Chesnutt, Springer, Arthur	3:06
Total length:			33:40

== Personnel ==
- Mark Chesnutt – lead vocals
- John Barlow Jarvis – acoustic piano, organ
- Steve Nathan – acoustic piano, organ, synthesizers
- Wayne Toups – squeezebox
- Mark Casstevens – acoustic guitar
- Pat Flynn – acoustic guitar
- B. James Lowry – acoustic guitar
- Biff Watson – acoustic guitar
- Brent Mason – electric guitars
- Brent Rowan – electric guitars
- Buddy Emmons – steel guitar
- Paul Franklin – steel guitar
- Sonny Garrish – steel guitar
- Mike Brignardello – bass
- Michael Rhodes – bass
- Glenn Worf – bass
- Owen Hale – drums
- Lonnie Wilson – drums
- Tom Roady – percussion
- Larry Franklin – fiddle
- Kirk "Jelly Roll" Johnson – harmonica
- The Nashville String Machine – strings
- Bergen White – string arrangements
- Carl Gorodetzky – string conductor
- Tim Davis – backing vocals
- Natalie Grant – backing vocals
- Liana Manis – backing vocals
- Chris Rodriguez – backing vocals
- John Wesley Ryles – backing vocals
- Dennis Wilson – backing vocals
- Curtis Young – backing vocals

Production

- Mark Wright – producer
- Greg Droman – recording, mixing
- Robert Charles – second engineer
- Tim Coyle – second engineer
- Joe Hayden – second engineer
- Ronnie Thomas – mastering
- Hank Williams – mastering
- MasterMix (Nashville, Tennessee) – mastering location
- John Drioli – project coordinator
- Karen Gillon – creative director
- Mickey Braithwaite – design
- Jim "Señor" McGuire – photography
- Sheri McCoy-Haynes – stylist
- Melanie Shelley – grooming
- Ladd Management – management

== Chart performance ==
=== Weekly charts ===
Chart (1999)	Peak position
Canadian Country Albums (RPM)	6
US Billboard 200	65
US Top Country Albums (Billboard)	6

=== Year-end charts ===
Chart (1999)	Position
US Top Country Albums (Billboard)	68
