= Lolark Sasthi =

Hindu festival

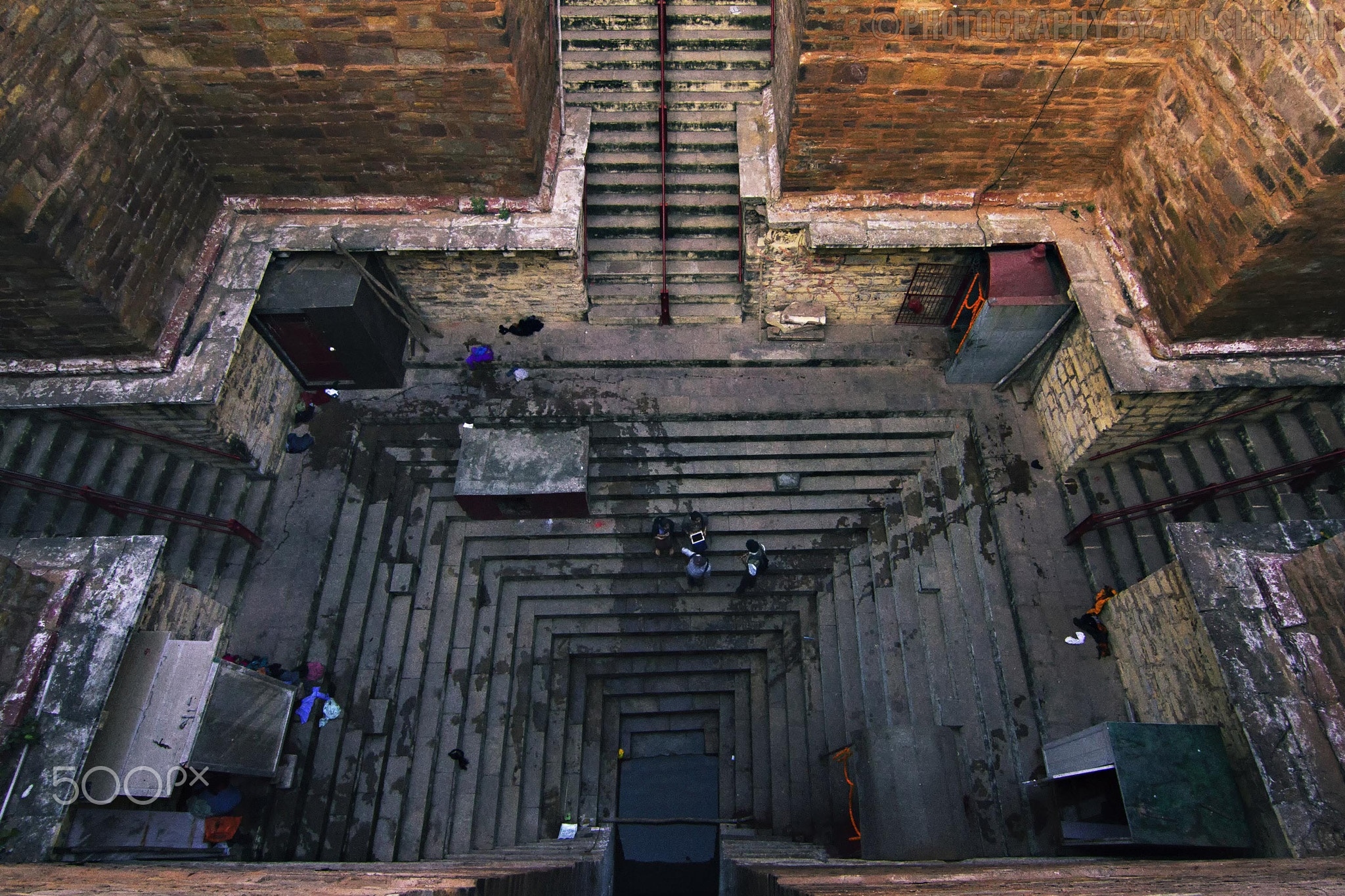
Lolark Kund near Tulsi Ghat

Lolark Shasthi is a Hindu festival celebrated near Tulsi Ghat in Varanasi, India. It falls during the monsoon season, on the sixth day of the bright half of the month of Bhadrapada (usually in September).

== Observances ==
Dedicated to Surya, the Sun God in Hinduism, Varanasi will witness the holy dip taken by thousands of female devotees in the ancient stepwell pond of Lolark Kund (a sacred water body in Hinduism) and mark the festival of Lolarak. Couples from Varanasi and its neighbouring villages will perform religious rituals and pray to Lord Lolark Aditya that they be blessed with a child. Devotees will leave their clothes and a fruit or a vegetable (from which they pledge to abstain thereafter) in the kund after taking a holy dip in the Lolark kund. Many do so with hopes for a male child/heir or offspring. As thousands come to bathe in the holy waters of the Lolark kund at sunrise, a makeshift colourful bazaar mushrooms around the kund. Families cook puris on open campfires all around the ancient kund. Steps lead down to the Kund from three sides. On the fourth side, the kund takes the shape of an enlonged, arched well, pointing in the direction of the rising sun (Ganges). Some devotees also throw considerable amounts of gold jewellery into the pond, which may later be harvested and distributed amongst the Mahant and Brahmins in order to finance the event and its clean-up afterwards.

== See also ==
- Benares
- Fertility deity
