= What Kind of Love Are You On =

Single by Aerosmith

from the album Armageddon: The Album
- Released: 1998
- Recorded: 1996
- Genre: Hard rock
- Length: 3:15
- Label: Columbia
- Songwriters: Steven Tyler; Joe Perry; Jack Blades; Tommy Shaw
- Producer: Matt Serletic

Aerosmith singles chronology
"I Don't Want to Miss a Thing" (1998)	"What Kind of Love Are You On" (1998)	""Pink" (re-release)" (1999)

"What Kind of Love Are You On" is a song by American hard rock band Aerosmith. The song, originally a track left off the Nine Lives album, was included on Armageddon: The Album for the 1998 film Armageddon starring lead singer Steven Tyler's daughter Liv Tyler. The song, was released as a promotional single to rock radio, reaching number 4 on the Mainstream Rock Tracks chart. Tyler co-wrote the song with guitarist Joe Perry and outside songwriters Jack Blades and Tommy Shaw (both formerly of Damn Yankees). It is the second song written for the film, the other being "I Don't Want to Miss a Thing".

== Charts ==
Chart (1998)	Peak position
US Mainstream Rock (Billboard)	4
