= This Heartache Never Sleeps =

Single by Mark Chesnutt

from the album I Don't Want to Miss a Thing
- B-side: "That's the You Make on Ex"
- Released: April 14, 1999
- Genre: Country
- Length: 3:48
- Label: Decca
- Songwriters: Tim Johnson, Daryl Burgess
- Producer: Mark Wright

Mark Chesnutt singles chronology
"I Don't Want to Miss a Thing" (1999)	"This Heartache Never Sleeps" (1999)	"Fallin' Never Felt So Good" (2000)

"This Heartache Never Sleeps" is a song written by Tim Johnson and Daryl Burgess, and recorded by American country music artist Mark Chesnutt. It was released in April 1999 as the second single from the album I Don't Want to Miss a Thing. The song reached number 17 on the Billboard Hot Country Singles & Tracks chart and peaked at number 10 on the Canadian RPM Country Tracks chart.

== Chart performance ==
"This Heartache Never Sleeps" debuted at number 75 on the U.S. Billboard Hot Country Singles & Tracks for the week of April 24, 1999.

Chart (1999)	Peak position
Canada Country Singles (RPM)	10
US Bubbling Under Hot 100 (Billboard)	1
US Hot Country Songs (Billboard)	17

=== Year-end charts ===
Chart (1999)	Position
Canada Country Tracks (RPM)	65
US Country Songs (Billboard)	74
