= Nag Nathaiya =

Annual Hindu festival in Varanasi, India

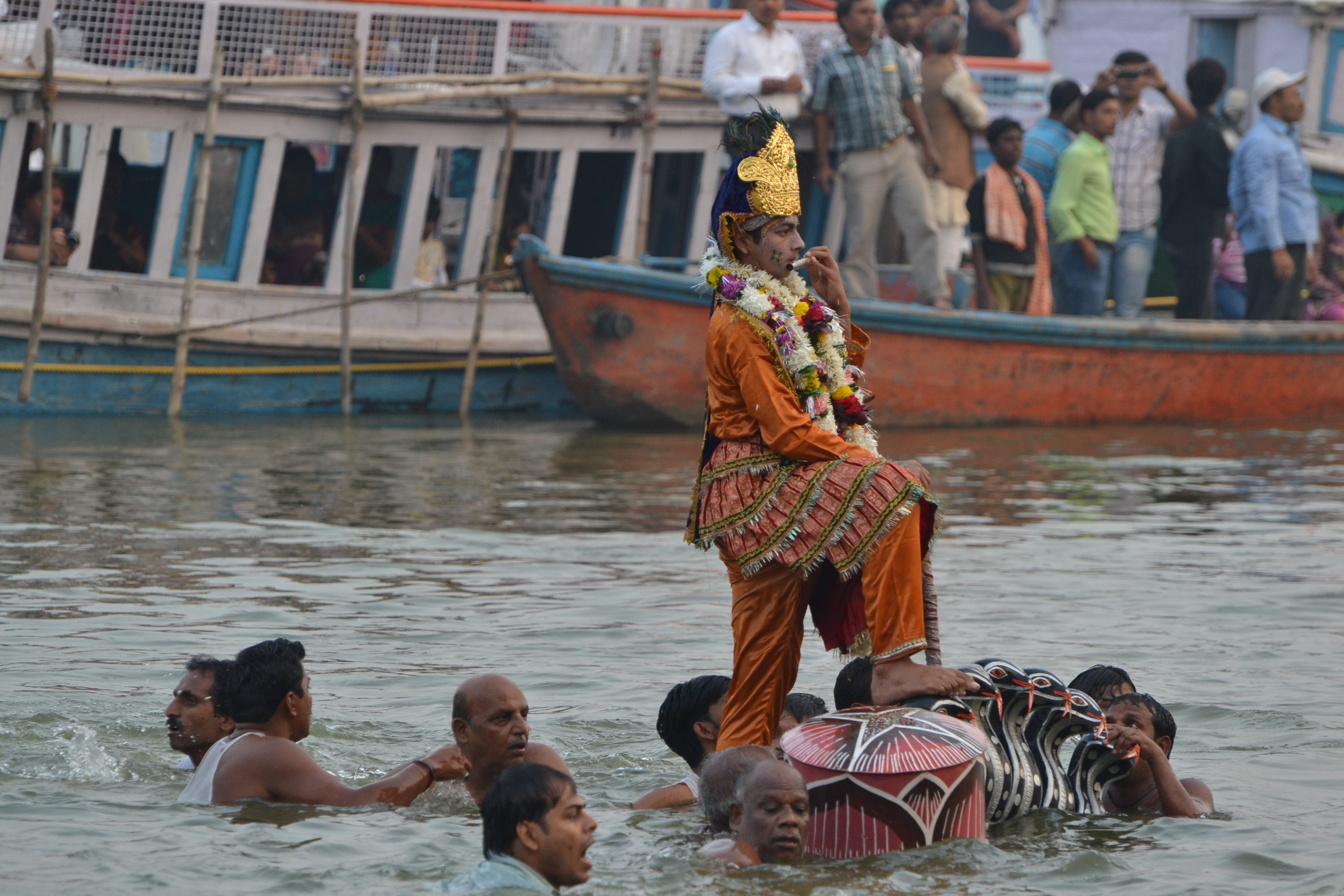
- Depiction of Krishna standing on serpent Kaliya at Nag Nathaiya festival in Varanasi.
- Also called: Victory over Evil
- Observed by: Hindus
- Type: Religious, Cultural
- Celebrations: Reenactment of Krishna's victory on Kaliya in Varanasi.
- Date: per Hindu calendar
- Frequency: Annual

Nag Nathaiya or Nag Nathaiya Leela is a Hindu festival held in the city of Varanasi in Bhojpur-Purvanchal region of India, commemorating the conquest of the god Krishna over the naga (serpent) Kaliya. The tale is reenacted annually the Tulsi Ghat on the fourth tithi of Kartik's light fortnight, Paksha; which is usually sometime between November and December.

== Background ==
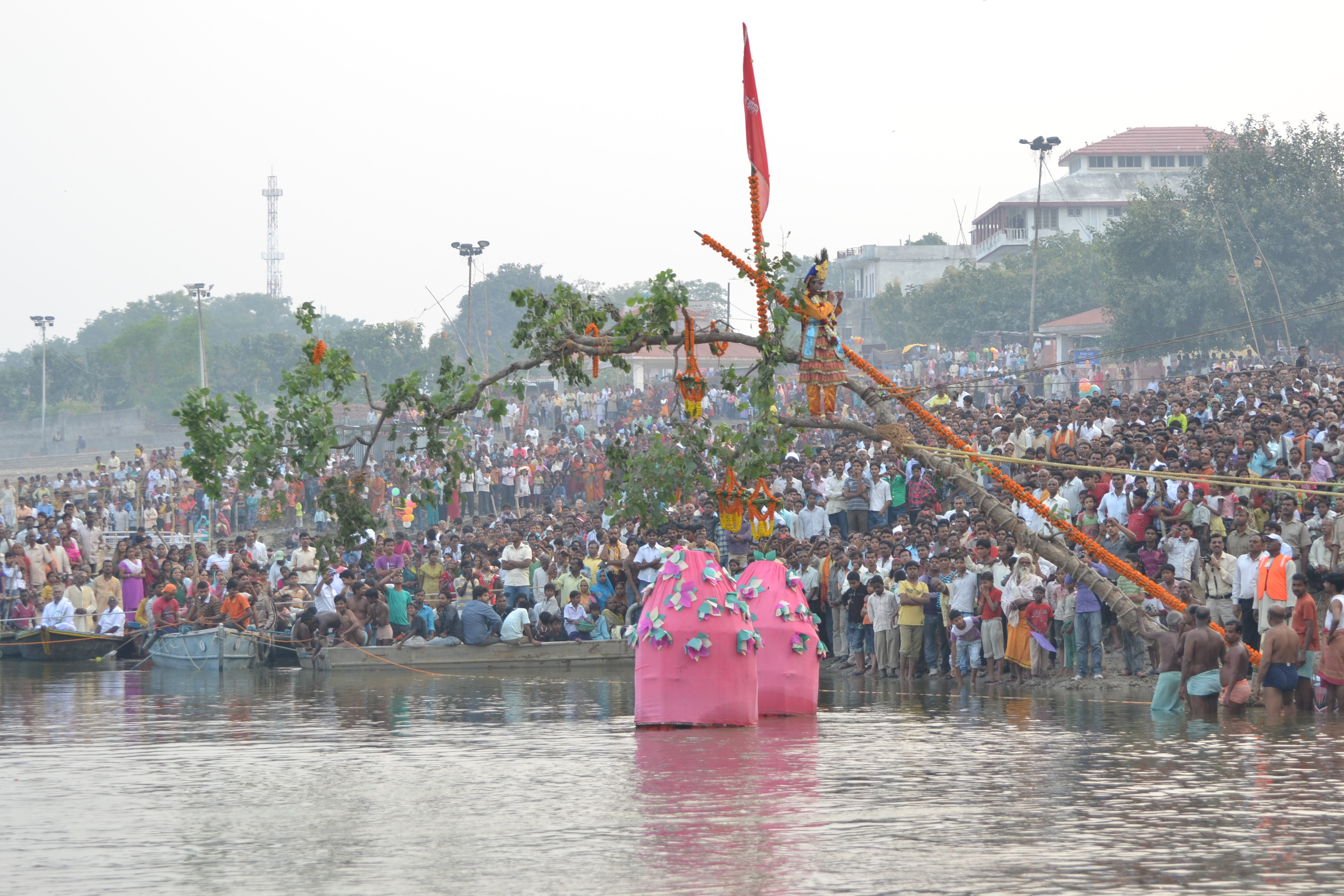
Krishna Standing on Kadamba tree at Nag Nathaiya festival.

This festival was started by Tulsi in the 16th century at Tulsi Ghat.

The legend of Nag Nathaiya festival is associated with Krishna's victory on the serpent (naga) Kaliya. One day while playing with his friends in Gokula, the child Krishna lost the ball in the Yamuna river. Krishna dived into the river to fetch it. There he was confronted by the poisonous serpent, Kaliya. The snake ensnared Krishna in his coils. After a long battle, Kaliya surrendered to Krishna and promised not to hurt the villagers. The snake lifted Krishna on its head and took him to the surface. On the other hand, Krishna's friends became worried as he was missing for a long time and gathered the villagers. Krishna not only defeated the snake but also purified the water and the air of the poison that was spread by the naga. It is described as one of lilas (Divine play) of Krishna.

== Festivities ==
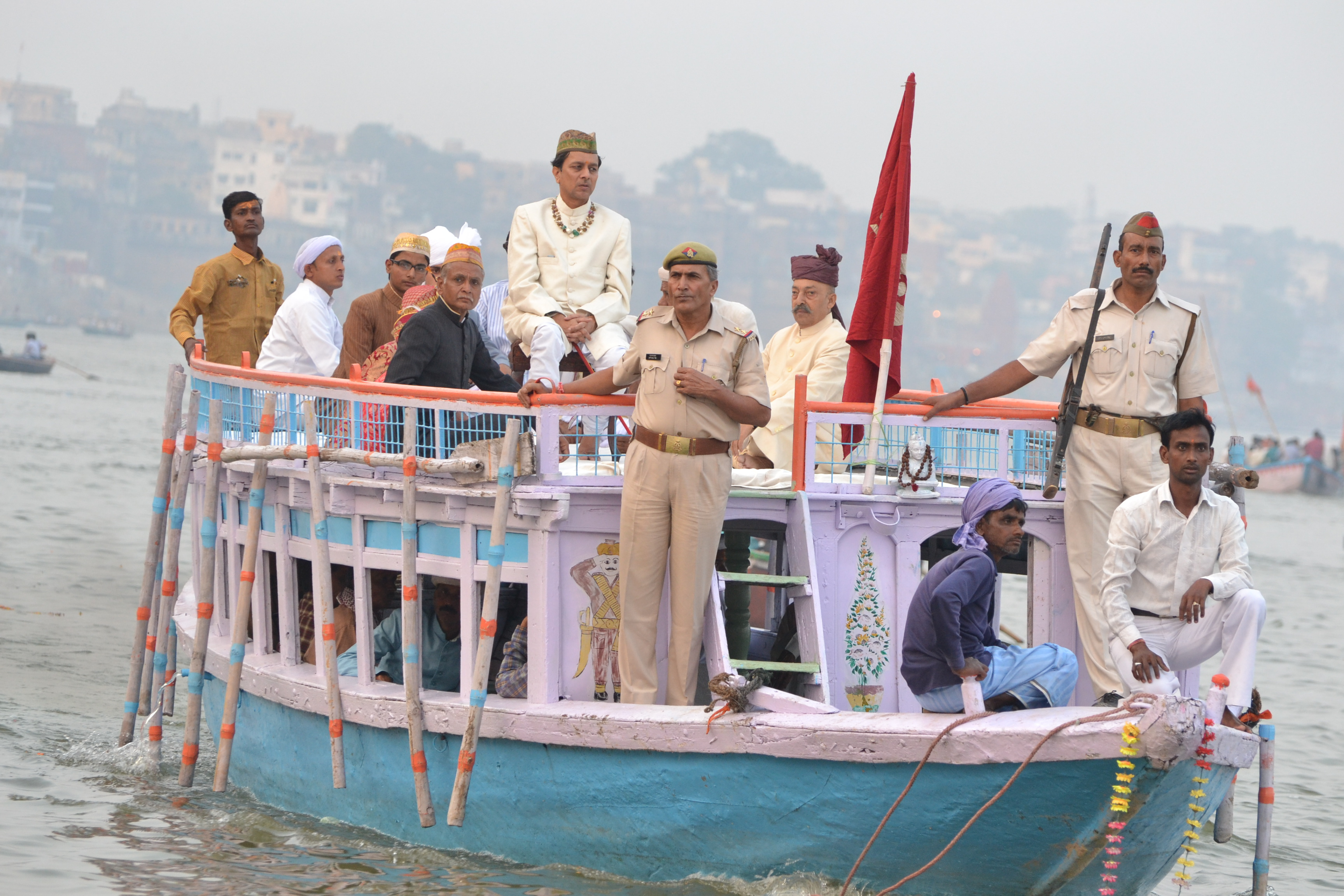
Kashi Naresh Anant Narayan Singh on the ocassaion of Nag Nathaiya festival in Varanasi in Kartik.

At Tulsi ghat, a large Kadamba tree branch is planted at the edge of the river Ganga. A young boy acting as Krishna - who is believed to be the embodied form (svarup) of Krishna - jumps from the tree branch into the river, where an effigy of Kaliya lies. The boy Krishna climbs onto Kaliya's head and strikes a flute playing pose. Propelled by human assistants, the serpent effigy along with the boy Krishna on its head make a circular sweep in the water, parading in front of thousands of spectators, who watch the display from the river bank or from boats floating on the river waters.

The festival is attended by Kashi Naresh (the titular king of Varanasi) every year who views the Leela from royal boat. Later he gives awards to the actors performing in Leela.
