= Armageddon: The Album =

Soundtrack album by Various artists
- Released: June 23, 1998
- Genre: Rock
- Length: 57:05
- Labels: Columbia; Hollywood; Sony Music Soundtrax

Singles from Armageddon: Music From the Motion Picture
- 1. "I Don't Want to Miss a Thing" Released: July 29, 1998; 2. "What Kind of Love Are You On" Released: 1998; 3. "Remember Me" Released: June 23, 1998 (Note: Later released on The Journey Continues, a Japanese-exclusive compilation album. Journey - The Journey Continues..Complete Best, 2001-01-31)

Professional ratings
Review scores
Source	Rating
AllMusic	2.5/5 stars

Armageddon: Music From the Motion Picture is the soundtrack album to the 1998 science fiction film Armageddon, released by Columbia Records and Hollywood Records on June 23, 1998. The album features several songs recorded specifically for the soundtrack, including "I Don't Want to Miss a Thing" and "What Kind of Love Are You On", performed by Aerosmith; "Remember Me", performed by Journey; and "Mister Big Time", performed by Jon Bon Jovi. Our Lady Peace's "Starseed" is a remixed version of the original. The album was commercially successful in Japan, and was certified double platinum for 400,000 copies shipped in 1999.

== Track listing ==
Armageddon: The Album track listing
No.	Title	Writer(s)	Producer(s)	Length
1.	"I Don't Want to Miss a Thing" (Aerosmith)	Diane Warren	Matt Serletic	4:59
2.	"Remember Me" (Journey)	Jonathan Cain; Neal Schon; Jack Blades	Kevin Shirley	5:33
3.	"What Kind of Love Are You On" (Aerosmith)	Steven Tyler; Joe Perry; Jack Blades; Tommy Shaw	Matt Serletic	3:15
4.	"La Grange" (ZZ Top)	Billy Gibbons; Dusty Hill; Frank Beard	Bill Ham	3:38
5.	"Roll Me Away" (Bob Seger)	Bob Seger	Jimmy Iovine	4:42
6.	"When the Rainbow Comes" (Shawn Colvin)	Karl Wallinger	Marc Tanner	4:25
7.	"Sweet Emotion (David Thoener Remix)" (Aerosmith)	Steven Tyler; Tom Hamilton	Jack Douglas	5:13
8.	"Mister Big Time" (Jon Bon Jovi)	Jon Bon Jovi; Aldo Nova	Aldo Nova; Jon Bon Jovi; Stephen Lironi	2:51
9.	"Come Together" (Aerosmith)	John Lennon; Paul McCartney	Jack Douglas; George Martin	3:48
10.	"Wish I Were You" (Patty Smyth)	Patty Smyth-McEnroe; Glen Burtnik	Matt Serletic	3:53
11.	"Starseed" (Our Lady Peace)	Raine Maida	Arnold Lanni	4:23
12.	"Leaving on a Jet Plane" (Chantal Kreviazuk)	John Denver	Peter Asher	4:45
13.	"Theme from Armageddon"	Trevor Rabin		3:12
14.	"Animal Crackers" (Steven Tyler with dialogue by Ben Affleck and Liv Tyler)	Diane Warren; Trevor Rabin; Harry Gregson-Williams	Matt Serletic	2:40
Total length:				56:41

== Charts ==
=== Weekly charts ===
Weekly chart performance for Armageddon: The Album
Chart (1998–1999)	Peak position
Australian Albums (ARIA)	5
Austrian Albums (Ö3 Austria)	1
Belgian Albums (Ultratop Flanders)	28
Canada Top Albums/CDs (RPM)	1
Dutch Albums (Album Top 100)	56
Finnish Albums (Suomen virallinen lista)	20
French Albums (SNEP)	22
German Albums (Offizielle Top 100)	3
Hungarian Albums (MAHASZ)	11
Japanese Albums (Oricon)	8
New Zealand Albums (RMNZ)	10
Norwegian Albums (VG-lista)	22
Scottish Albums (Official Charts)	41
Swedish Albums (Sverigetopplistan)	40
Swiss Albums (Schweizer Hitparade)	1
UK Albums (Official Charts)	19
US Billboard 200	1

=== Year-end charts ===
1998 year-end chart performance for Armageddon: The Album
Chart (1998)	Position
Australian Albums (ARIA)	78
Austrian Albums (Ö3 Austria)	11
German Albums (Offizielle Top 100)	48
Swiss Albums (Schweizer Hitparade)	35
US Billboard 200	15

1999 year-end chart performance for Armageddon: The Album
Chart (1999)	Position
Japanese Albums (Oricon)	73
US Billboard 200	72

== Certifications ==
Certifications for Armageddon: The Album
Region	Certification	Certified units/sales
Australia (ARIA)	Gold	35,000^{^}
Brazil (Pro-Música Brasil)	Gold	100,000^{*}
Canada (Music Canada)	7× Platinum	700,000^{^}
Japan (RIAJ)	2× Platinum	400,000
New Zealand (RMNZ)	Gold	7,500^{^}
Switzerland (IFPI Switzerland)	Gold	25,000^{^}
United Kingdom (BPI)	Gold	100,000^{^}
United States (RIAA)	4× Platinum	4,110,000
^{*} Sales figures based on certification alone.^{^} Shipments figures based on certification alone.
