= Dhrupad Mela =

Dhrupad Mela is an annual music festival held in Varanasi, India. It features performances in the dhrupad tradition of Indian classical music.
