= St. Mary's Cathedral, Varanasi =

Coordinates: 25°19′52.7″N 82°59′02.4″E

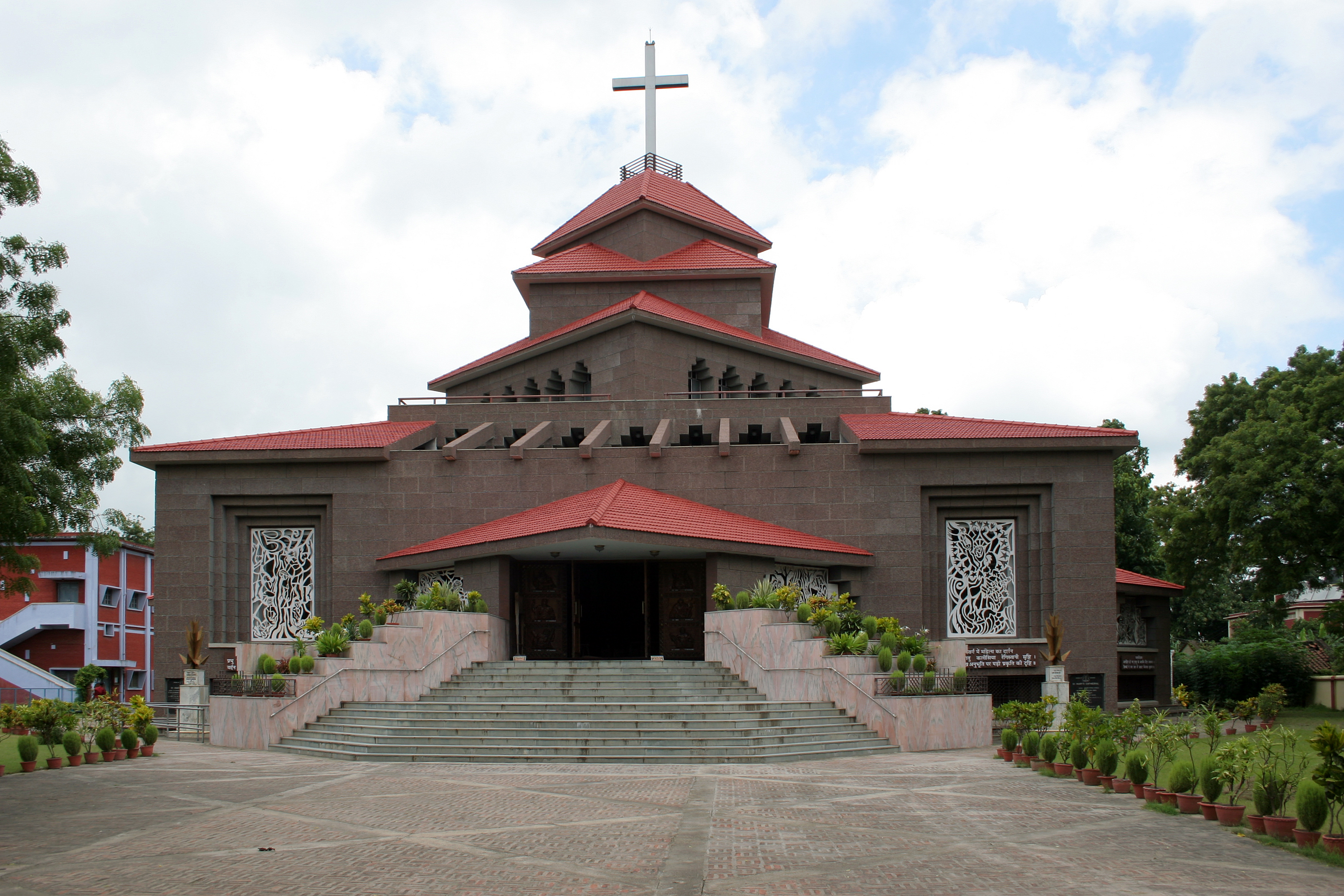
Saint Mary's Cathedral

St. Mary's Cathedral is a cathedral in Varanasi, in the Indian state of Uttar Pradesh.

== History ==
The cathedral was constructed at a cost of 15 million rupees, and completed in 1992.

== Architecture ==
The cathedral has a height of about 100 meters, and this includes a 30-meter steel cross on the top.

Intended to exemplify a new model of Catholic architecture in India, distinct from European models, the cathedral's architecture draws from Indian styles. Influence of Hindu temple architecture is seen in its mountain-like shape, composed of tiered levels, its porches (resembling mandapas), and the fact that it was designed in order to be circumambulated.

The cathedral's lower portion is in the form of a mandala, and has sixteen sides, and this layout is created using two equal squares. In these sides are recessed jalis which depict the story of Christ (Khrista katha).
