= Nine Lives (Aerosmith song) =

Single by Aerosmith

from the album Nine Lives
- Released: 1997
- Recorded: 1996
- Genre: Hard rock, punk rock, punk blues, blues rock
- Length: 4:01
- Label: Columbia
- Songwriters: Steven Tyler, Joe Perry, Marti Frederiksen
- Producer: Kevin Shirley

Aerosmith singles chronology
"Walk on Water" (1995)	"Nine Lives" (1997)	"Falling in Love (Is Hard on the Knees)" (1997)

"Nine Lives" is a song by American hard rock band Aerosmith. It was released in 1997 as the lead single and title track from the album Nine Lives. The song was written by lead singer Steven Tyler, guitarist Joe Perry, and songwriter Marti Frederiksen.

The song starts with Tyler imitating a cat's wail.

== Chart position ==
"Nine Lives" was released as a promotional single to rock radio and peaked at #37 on the Mainstream Rock Tracks chart in 1997.

== In concert ==
On the band's lengthy Nine Lives Tour from 1997 to 1999, "Nine Lives" was almost always the opener. The band also performed the song on a few television appearances, including one on Saturday Night Live.

== In other media ==
"Nine Lives" is one of the two theme songs performed by Aerosmith used in the video game Dead or Alive 3 for the Xbox created by Team Ninja. It is played during the intro.

The song used to play on Rock 'n' Roller Coaster Starring Aerosmith at Disney's Hollywood Studios at Walt Disney World. It was exclusive to the "limousine" (ride vehicle) with a license plate that read "1QKLIMO".
