= I Don't Want to Miss a Thing =

1998 single by Aerosmith

Single by Aerosmith

from the album Armageddon: The Album
- B-side: "Animal Crackers"; "Taste of India"
- Released: July 29, 1998
- Studio: The Hit Factory (New York City)
- Genre: Hard rock; pop rock; glam metal
- Length: 4:59
- Label: Columbia
- Songwriter: Diane Warren
- Producer: Matt Serletic

Aerosmith singles chronology
"Taste of India" (1998)	"I Don't Want to Miss a Thing" (1998)	"What Kind of Love Are You On" (1998)

Audio sample
- file; help

Music video
- "I Don't Want to Miss a Thing" on YouTube

"I Don't Want to Miss a Thing" is a song by American hard rock band Aerosmith that served as the theme song for the 1998 science fiction disaster film Armageddon, in which lead singer Steven Tyler's daughter Liv starred. It is one of four songs performed by the band for the film, the other three being "What Kind of Love Are You On", "Come Together", and "Sweet Emotion". The power ballad was written by Diane Warren, who originally envisioned it would be performed by "Celine Dion or somebody like that". U2 were initially asked to perform the song for the film – the idea of using Aerosmith only came about after Liv Tyler was cast. The song received its airplay premiere on May 12, 1998, and was officially added to radio a week later.

"I Don't Want to Miss a Thing" was first released in Japan on July 29, 1998. In the United States, it was originally supposed to be a radio-only single from Armageddon: The Album, but due to popular demand, Columbia Records issued the song commercially in August 1998. It subsequently debuted at number one on the Billboard Hot 100, giving the band their first and only number-one single in their home country, remaining at the top for four weeks. The song also peaked at number one for multiple weeks in several other countries, including Australia, Ireland, and Norway. In the United Kingdom, it sold over two million copies and reached number four on the UK Singles Chart. The song was nominated for an Oscar as Best Original Song at the 71st Academy Awards of 1998, but lost to "When You Believe" from The Prince of Egypt.

The song was covered by American country music singer Mark Chesnutt for his album of the same name. In early 1999, his version was a top-twenty hit on the Billboard Hot 100 while also topping the Billboard Hot Country Songs charts.

== Inspiration and background ==
In 1997, Diane Warren was watching Barbara Walters interview James Brolin and Barbra Streisand. Brolin said he missed Streisand when they were asleep, and Warren wrote down the words "I don't want to miss a thing," before there was even a song. "When I first heard it," recalled drummer Joey Kramer, "it was just a demo with piano and singing. It was difficult to imagine what kind of touch Aerosmith could put on it and make it our own… As soon as we began playing it as a band, then it instantly became an Aerosmith song."

== Critical reception ==
The song received generally positive reviews from critics. Billboard wrote, "If you're among the many who adore Aerosmith when it indulges in power balladry à la "Angel", then you're in for a real treat. This tune from the imminent soundtrack to "Armageddon" shows the enduring rock troupe happily giving in to the romance of superstar tunesmith Diane Warren's sweet tune—but with an appropriate dash of guitar-juiced melodrama. Steven Tyler's signature belting is so intensely over the top that he frequently seems to be shrieking. It's a high-voltage performance that is matched by a collision of rock-styled instrumentation and grand, faux-classical orchestration. It's a recipe that will prove irresistible to programmers at top 40 and AC formats."

Birmingham Evening Mail commented, "Songwriter Diane Warren weaves her magic again with a bombastic power ballad from the 'Armageddon' movie soundtrack. It perfectly suits Steven Tyler's sleazy vocals as the track moves towards its strings-soaked conclusion." Daily Record called it an "epic ballad which has Steve Tyler impersonating of Bryan Adams". They also noted it as an "end-of-the-night disco favourite".

== Music video ==
The music video was shot at the Minneapolis Armory in May 1998 and features scenes from the film along with a cameo by Liv Tyler in her role as Grace Stamper. While the band plays with an orchestra backing them in a studio filled with giant banners of NASA, the banners fall in the second chorus, revealing the studio to be the launchpad of Space Shuttle Freedom from the film, while F-15 and T-38 jets fly in formation overhead.

== Impact and legacy ==
This song was Aerosmith's biggest hit, debuting at number one on the US Billboard Hot 100, where it stayed for four weeks in from September 5 to October 3, 1998, and reaching number one around the world, including Australia, Germany, Greece, Ireland, Austria, Norway, Italy, the Netherlands, and Switzerland. It helped introduce Aerosmith to a new generation and remains a slow dance staple.

On November 28, 2015, boxer Tyson Fury sang the song after beating long reigning heavyweight champion Wladimir Klitschko in Düsseldorf, Germany. Fury sang the song again after beating Tom Schwarz in 2019 at the MGM Grand Arena in Las Vegas.

== Track listings ==
US CD and cassette single

1. "I Don't Want to Miss a Thing" – 4:58
2. "Animal Crackers" – 2:36
3. "Taste of India" (rock remix) – 5:52

UK CD1

1. "I Don't Want to Miss a Thing" – 4:58
2. "Taste of India" (rock remix) – 5:52
3. "Animal Crackers" – 2:36

UK CD2

1. "I Don't Want to Miss a Thing" – 4:58
2. "Pink" (live) – 3:45
3. "Crash" – 4:26

UK 7-inch picture disc and European CD single

1. "I Don't Want to Miss a Thing" – 4:58
2. "Taste of India" (rock remix) – 5:52

European maxi-CD single

1. "I Don't Want to Miss a Thing" – 4:58
2. "Taste of India" (rock remix) – 5:52
3. "Crash" – 4:25
4. "Animal Crackers" – 2:36

Australian and Japanese CD single

1. "I Don't Want to Miss a Thing" – 4:58
2. "I Don't Want to Miss a Thing" (rock mix) – 4:58
3. "Taste of India" (rock remix) – 5:52
4. "Animal Crackers" – 2:36

== Credits and personnel ==
Credits are adapted from the Armageddon soundtrack's liner notes.

Studio

- Recorded and mixed at The Hit Factory (New York City)

Personnel

- Diane Warren – writing
- Matt Serletic – production, arrangement
- Mark Dobson – production and arrangement assistance
- David Thoener – engineering
- Rob Murphy – engineering assistance
- Alex Dejonge – engineering assistance
- Suzie Katayama – conducting (strings)

== Charts ==
=== Weekly charts ===
1998 weekly chart performance for "I Don't Want to Miss a Thing"
Chart (1998)	Peak position
Australia (ARIA)	1
Austria (Ö3 Austria Top 40)	1
Belgium (Ultratop 50 Flanders)	3
Belgium (Ultratop 50 Wallonia)	4
Canada Top Singles (RPM)	2
Canada Adult Contemporary (RPM)	6
Colombia (Notimex)	3
Denmark (IFPI)	8
Estonia (Eesti Top 20)	1
Europe (Eurochart Hot 100)	1
Finland (Suomen virallinen lista)	3
France (SNEP)	8
Germany (GfK)	1
Greece (IFPI)	1
Honduras (Notimex)	3
Hungary (Mahasz)	5
Iceland (Íslenski Listinn Topp 40)	1
Ireland (IRMA)	1
Italy (FIMI)	1
Italy Airplay (Music & Media)	1
Latvia (Latvijas Top 40)	1
Netherlands (Dutch Top 40)	3
Netherlands (Single Top 100)	3
Norway (VG-lista)	1
Scottish Singles Sales (Official Charts)	3
Spain (AFYVE)	4
Sweden (Sverigetopplistan)	2
Switzerland (Schweizer Hitparade)	1
UK Singles (Official Charts)	4
UK Airplay (Music Week)	4
US Billboard Hot 100	1
US Adult Contemporary (Billboard)	13
US Adult Pop Airplay (Billboard)	2
US Hot Latin Songs (Billboard)	14
US Mainstream Rock Airplay (Billboard)	4
US Pop Airplay (Billboard)	1
US Rhythmic Airplay (Billboard)	25

2012 weekly chart performance for "I Don't Want to Miss a Thing"
Chart (2012)	Peak position
Japan Hot 100 (Billboard)	96

2026 weekly chart performance for "I Don't Want to Miss a Thing"
Chart (2026)	Peak position
Poland Airplay (OLiS)	87

=== Year-end charts ===
Year-end chart performance for "I Don't Want to Miss a Thing"
Chart (1998)	Position
Australia (ARIA)	4
Austria (Ö3 Austria Top 40)	6
Belgium (Ultratop 50 Flanders)	13
Belgium (Ultratop 50 Wallonia)	27
Canada Top Singles (RPM)	19
Canada Adult Contemporary (RPM)	27
Europe (European Hot 100 Singles)	3
France (SNEP)	58
Germany (Media Control)	14
Iceland (Íslenski Listinn Topp 40)	1
Italy (Musica e dischi)	2
Netherlands (Dutch Top 40)	18
Netherlands (Single Top 100)	23
Sweden (Hitlistan)	4
Switzerland (Schweizer Hitparade)	5
UK Singles (OCC)	17
UK Airplay (Music Week)	37
US Billboard Hot 100	23
US Adult Contemporary (Billboard)	38
US Adult Top 40 (Billboard)	18
US Mainstream Rock Tracks (Billboard)	19
US Mainstream Top 40 (Billboard)	5
US Rhythmic Top 40 (Billboard)	94

=== Decade-end charts ===
Decade-end chart performance for "I Don't Want to Miss a Thing"
Chart (1990–1999)	Position
Austria (Ö3 Austria Top 40)	88
US Billboard Hot 100	73

== Certifications ==
Certifications and sales for "I Don't Want to Miss a Thing"
Region	Certification	Certified units/sales
Australia (ARIA)	2× Platinum	140,000^{^}
Austria (IFPI Austria)	Gold	25,000^{*}
Belgium (BRMA)	Platinum	50,000^{*}
Denmark (IFPI Danmark)	2× Platinum	180,000^{‡}
France (SNEP)	Gold	250,000^{*}
Germany (BVMI)	Platinum	500,000^{^}
Italy (FIMI)	Platinum	50,000^{‡}
Japan (RIAJ) digital 2006 release	Gold	100,000^{*}
Japan (RIAJ) physical	Platinum	100,000^{^}
Mexico (AMPROFON)	Gold	30,000^{*}
Netherlands (NVPI)	Gold	50,000^{^}
New Zealand (RMNZ)	4× Platinum	120,000^{‡}
Norway (IFPI Norway)	Platinum	
Portugal (AFP)	Platinum	40,000^{‡}
Spain (Promusicae)	2× Platinum	120,000^{‡}
Sweden (GLF)	2× Platinum	60,000^{^}
Switzerland (IFPI Switzerland)	Platinum	50,000^{^}
United Kingdom (BPI)	4× Platinum	2,400,000^{‡}
United States (RIAA)	5× Platinum	5,000,000^{‡}
United States (RIAA) Physical	Gold	500,000^{^}
^{*} Sales figures based on certification alone.^{^} Shipments figures based on certification alone.^{‡} Sales+streaming figures based on certification alone.

== Release history ==
Release dates and formats for "I Don't Want to Miss a Thing"
Region	Date	Format(s)	Label(s)	Ref(s).
United States	May 18–19, 1998	Contemporary hit; active rock radio (Note: According to both the Gavin Report and Radio & Records, the song was serviced to additional formats on these dates as well.)	Columbia	
Japan	July 29, 1998	CD	Sony	
United States	August 18, 1998	7-inch vinyl; CD; cassette	Columbia	
United Kingdom	August 31, 1998	7-inch vinyl; CD	Columbia	

== Mark Chesnutt version ==
"I Don't Want to Miss a Thing"

Single by Mark Chesnutt

from the album I Don't Want to Miss a Thing
- B-side: "Wherever You Are"
- Released: December 1, 1998
- Genre: Country
- Length: 4:10
- Label: Decca
- Songwriter: Diane Warren
- Producer: Mark Wright

Mark Chesnutt singles chronology
"Wherever You Are" (1998)	"I Don't Want to Miss a Thing" (1998)	"This Heartache Never Sleeps" (1999)

In December 1998, country music artist Mark Chesnutt released a cover version of the song. His rendition is the first single and title track from his 1999 album of the same name.

Chesnutt chose to cover the song through the suggestion of his record producer Mark Wright, who had heard the Aerosmith version on his car radio. According to Wright, he and Chesnutt only listened to Aerosmith's rendition twice before recording, in order to allow Chesnutt to come up with a rendition that was "his". Because the two thought that his version had potential as a single, his label Decca Records withdrew his then-current single "Wherever You Are" in late 1998 and began promotion of "I Don't Want to Miss a Thing" instead. Chesnutt also said that he chose to do the song because he thought that it would help revive his then-flagging album sales and chart performance.

Despite showing favor toward the cover at the time, Chesnutt remarked in 2016 that he "didn't want to cut it" and that, even though his version topped the country music charts and was successful on radio, sales were poor for both the single and the corresponding album. He also noted that soon afterward, he exited his label after refusing their offer to cover another pop song.

=== Charts ===
==== Weekly charts ====
Weekly chart performance for "I Don't Want to Miss a Thing"
Chart (1998–1999)	Peak position
Canada Country Singles (RPM)	1
US Billboard Hot 100	17
US Hot Country Songs (Billboard)	1

==== Year-end charts ====
Year-end chart performance for "I Don't Want to Miss a Thing"
Chart (1999)	Position
Canada Country Tracks (RPM)	21
US Billboard Hot 100	67
US Country Songs (Billboard)	9
