= Ramesh Mishra =

Indian sarangi player

Ramesh Mishra (Hindi: रमेश मिश्रा, surname also spelled Misra) (Varanasi, India, 2 October 1948 – New York, U.S., 13 March 2017) was an Indian sarangi player.

Mishra comes from a family of sarangi players and studied from an early age from a number of his older relatives. He was a disciple of Ravi Shankar and has made numerous recordings. In addition to his performances of Indian classical music, he has recorded with the American rock band Aerosmith (on the 1997 album Nine Lives). Mishra was awarded a Sangeet Natak Akademi Award in 2008.

== Selected discography ==
- Waiting for Love (Shujaat Khan album) 1999

== Death ==
Mishra died of cancer on 13 March 2017 at the age of 68 in New York.
