= Falling in Love (Is Hard on the Knees) =

1997 single by Aerosmith

Single by Aerosmith

from the album Nine Lives
- B-side: "Fall Together"
- Released: February 11, 1997
- Length: 3:26
- Label: Columbia
- Songwriters: Steven Tyler; Joe Perry; Glen Ballard
- Producer: Kevin Shirley

Aerosmith singles chronology
"Nine Lives" (1997)	"Falling in Love (Is Hard on the Knees)" (1997)	"Hole in My Soul" (1997)

Music video
- "Falling in Love (Is Hard on the Knees)" on YouTube

"Falling in Love (Is Hard on the Knees)" is a song by American hard rock band Aerosmith that appeared on the band's 12th studio album, Nine Lives (1997). The song was written by Steven Tyler, Joe Perry, and Glen Ballard, who had signed on to produce Nine Lives. Although he was dropped from the role halfway through production and replaced by Kevin Shirley, Ballard was still credited for his contributions to the album.

Released as a single on February 11, 1997, the song topped the Spanish Singles Chart and reached number two in Canada for four weeks. It also topped the UK Rock Chart and the US Billboard Mainstream Rock chart. Elsewhere, the track peaked at number four in the Czech Republic while reaching the top 10 in Finland and the top 30 in Iceland, Sweden, Switzerland, and the United Kingdom. On the US Billboard Hot 100, it reached number 35.

== Chart performance ==
The song was a popular hit around the world, reaching number 35 on the US Billboard Hot 100, number one on the US Mainstream Rock Tracks chart and in Spain, number two in Canada, number 22 on the UK Singles Chart, and number 46 in Australia.

== Music video ==
A music video was produced to promote the single. The video was directed by Michael Bay, and had a surreal landscape described as "12 Monkeys meets Brazil". Many supermodels, such as Angie Everhart, are featured dressed as nurses, dominatrices and princesses.

== Track listings ==
US CD and cassette single

1. "Falling in Love (Is Hard on the Knees)" – 3:25
2. "Fall Together" – 4:38

UK and Australian CD single

1. "Falling in Love (Is Hard on the Knees)" – 3:25
2. "Fall Together" – 4:38
3. "Sweet Emotion" – 4:34
4. "Season of Wither" – 5:39

== Charts ==
=== Weekly charts ===
Chart (1997)	Peak position
Australia (ARIA)	46
Austria (Ö3 Austria Top 40)	35
Canada Top Singles (RPM)	2
Czech Republic (IFPI CR)	4
Europe (Eurochart Hot 100)	38
Finland (Suomen virallinen lista)	7
Germany (GfK)	40
Hungary (Mahasz)	8
Iceland (Íslenski Listinn Topp 40)	21
Italy Airplay (Music & Media)	2
Netherlands (Single Top 100)	76
Scottish Singles Sales (Official Charts)	17
Spain (AFYVE)	1
Sweden (Sverigetopplistan)	23
Switzerland (Schweizer Hitparade)	22
UK Singles (Official Charts)	22
UK Rock & Metal (Official Charts)	1
US Billboard Hot 100	35
US Mainstream Rock (Billboard)	1
US Pop Airplay (Billboard)	29

=== Year-end charts ===
Chart (1997)	Position
Canada Top Singles (RPM)	21
Romania (Romanian Top 100)	63
US Mainstream Rock Tracks (Billboard)	7

== Certifications ==
Region	Certification	Certified units/sales
United States (RIAA)	Gold	500,000^{^}
^{^} Shipments figures based on certification alone.

== Release history ==
Region	Date	Format(s)	Label(s)	Ref(s).
United States	February 11, 1997	Contemporary hit; rock radio; CD; cassette	Columbia	
United Kingdom	February 24, 1997	7-inch vinyl; CD; cassette	Columbia	
Japan	February 26, 1997	CD	Sony	
