= Pink (Aerosmith song) =

1997 single by Aerosmith

Single by Aerosmith

from the album Nine Lives
- Released: November 11, 1997
- Length: 3:55
- Label: Columbia
- Songwriters: Steven Tyler; Richie Supa; Glen Ballard
- Producer: Kevin Shirley

Aerosmith singles chronology
"Hole in My Soul" (1997)	"Pink" (1997)	"Full Circle" (1997)

Music video
- "Pink" on YouTube

"Pink" is a song by American rock band Aerosmith. It was written by Steven Tyler and professional songwriters Richie Supa and Glen Ballard. It was released as the third single from their 12th studio album, Nine Lives, in 1997. It gave the band their eighth number-one single on the US Billboard Mainstream Rock Tracks chart and peaked at number 27 on the Billboard Hot 100. In the United Kingdom, the song peaked at number 13 following a re-release in 1999.

== Music video ==
The music video for the song used CGI to morph characters' faces to other bodies. A variety of random characters mixed in with band members moving towards the camera, morphing into different characters in the process (e.g., Joe Perry as a centaur, Brad Whitford as a little boy, Steven Tyler as a skeleton, and a boy dressed as the Easter Bunny). The video premiered on November 11, 1997, and was directed by Doug Nichol.

Two versions of the music video exist. In the uncensored version, there is a woman dressed in a blue jumpsuit walking towards the camera. For a brief second, the top, unzipped portion of the jumpsuit is pulled away, revealing her right breast. There is another instance where a woman's breasts are briefly fully revealed when a woman, painted blue and green, does a pirouette.

The uncensored version caused minor controversy and several television networks required Nichol to censor the video for daytime airings. As a result, the edited version censored the pirouette scene. The censored version also shows Tyler and Perry presented as a two-headed man and only the coverup portion of the breast reveal scene is present.

== Live performances ==
As of 2007, "Pink" is one of only two songs from Nine Lives consistently played on Aerosmith tours, along with "Falling in Love (Is Hard on the Knees)".

== Awards ==
The song won the band their fourth and most recent Grammy Award in 1999 for Best Rock Performance by a Duo or Group with Vocal. Additionally, the video won an MTV Video Music Award for Best Rock Video in 1998.

== Track listing ==
No.	Title	Length
1.	"Pink" (album version)	3:55
2.	"Pink" (The South Beach mix)	3:54
3.	"Pink" (live)	3:45

== Charts ==
=== Weekly charts ===
Chart (1997)	Peak position
Canada Top Singles (RPM)	42
Canada Rock/Alternative (RPM)	8
Germany (GfK)	81
Netherlands (Single Top 100)	58
Scottish Singles Sales (Official Charts)	31
UK Singles (Official Charts)	38
US Billboard Hot 100	27
US Mainstream Rock Airplay (Billboard)	1

Chart (1999)	Peak position
Europe (Eurochart Hot 100)	56
Scottish Singles Sales (Official Charts)	11
UK Singles (Official Charts)	13

=== Year-end charts ===
Chart (1997)	Position
US Mainstream Rock Tracks (Billboard)	10

Chart (2025)	Position
Argentina Anglo Airplay (Monitor Latino)	55

== Certifications ==
Region	Certification	Certified units/sales
United States (RIAA)	Gold	500,000^{‡}
^{‡} Sales+streaming figures based on certification alone.

== Release history ==
Region	Date	Format(s)	Label(s)	Ref.
United States	November 11, 1997	Contemporary hit radio	Columbia	
United Kingdom	December 15, 1997	7-inch vinyl; CD	Columbia	
Japan	December 26, 1997	CD	Sony	
United Kingdom (re-release)	June 14, 1999	CD; cassette	Columbia	

== Covers and other versions ==
A different version of the song, the South Beach Mix, was included on the career-spanning compilation O, Yeah! Ultimate Aerosmith Hits.

Japanese edition of the "Pink" single from 'Nine Lives' features six tracks: three mixes of "Pink", plus live versions of "Falling In Love (Is Hard On The Knees)" & "Walk This Way" recorded in March 1997. As well, there is a techno remix of "Falling in Love (Is Hard On The Knees)" titled Moby Fucked Remix.

It is a bonus playable song in the video game Guitar Hero: Aerosmith, and the only track from Nine Lives present in the game. In the Wii and PlayStation 2 versions of this game, the word "high" (in "Pink gets me high as a kite") is removed.

Janelle Monáe's 2018 single "Pynk" interpolates Aerosmith's "Pink," with Steven Tyler and Glen Ballard being credited as co-writers.
