= Buck Johnson (musician) =

American musician

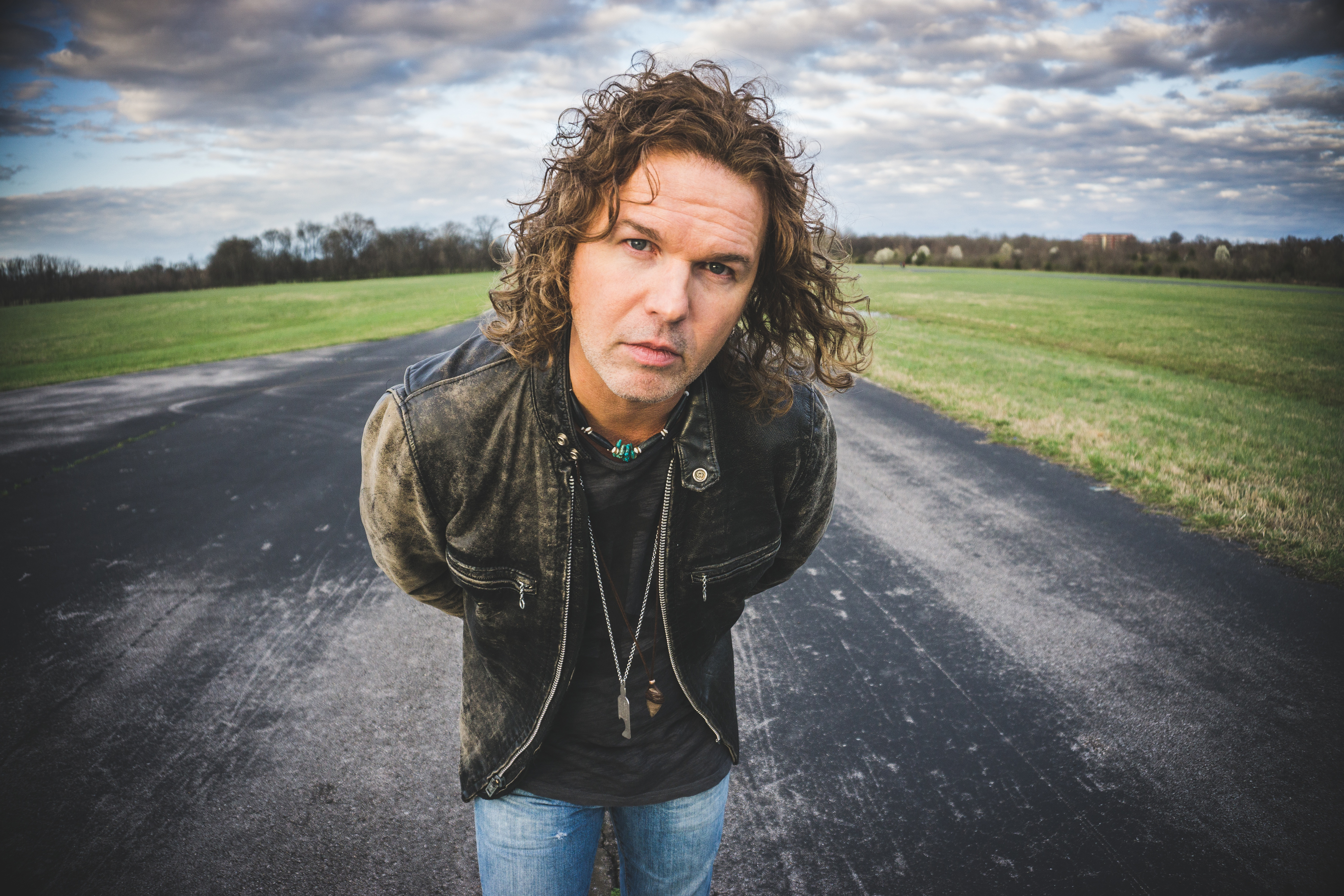
- Johnson in 2018

Background information
- Born: Burleigh Johnson; Birmingham, Alabama, U.S.
- Genres: Rock; Country
- Occupations: Musician; songwriter; producer
- Instruments: Keyboards; guitar; vocals
- Years active: 1990–present
- Member of: Aerosmith; Hollywood Vampires; Joe Perry Project; Brother Cane; Ringo Starr & His All-Starr Band
- Formerly of: Whiskey Falls

Burleigh "Buck" Johnson is an American musician performing as keyboardist, backing vocalist and acoustic guitarist with the rock bands Aerosmith, Hollywood Vampires (Johnny Depp, Alice Cooper, Joe Perry), Steven Tyler, The Joe Perry Project, Brother Cane and Ringo Starr & His All-Starr Band. He was co-vocalist, co-guitarist and keyboardist for the country music group Whiskey Falls (Midas Records). Johnson released his self produced album Tongue And Groove on September 20, 2024, on Rosepony Records. He has had songs placed in television, film and recorded by other artists including "Just Feel Better" by Carlos Santana, featuring Steven Tyler on lead vocals.

== Biography ==
Johnson was raised in Shady Grove, Alabama, outside of Birmingham. He began performing at an early age, singing gospel music with his family throughout the South. While attending Birmingham-Southern College, Buck met his wife, Kym, and they relocated to Los Angeles, California.

In Los Angeles, Johnson toured and recorded with such acts as The Doobie Brothers, Chris Stills, Tal Bachman, John Waite, Matthew Sweet, Shawn Mullins, The Thorns, and Timothy B. Schmit (The Eagles). He has worked as a songwriting collaborator, session vocalist and musician with songwriter/producers Jamie Houston (Carlos Santana, Jon McLaughlan) and Charlie Midnight (The Doobie Brothers).

As a songwriter, Johnson co-wrote the song "Just Feel Better" with Jamie Houston and Damon Johnson for Carlos Santana on his 2005 album All That I Am, featuring Steven Tyler on lead vocals.

In 2006, Buck joined the country rock band Whiskey Falls as a principal songwriter, co-vocalist and multi-instrumentalist, and moved to Nashville, Tennessee. Whiskey Falls released their self-titled album on Midas Records in 2007, earning two Country Top 40 hit singles, "Last Train Running" and "Falling Into You."

In 2014, Johnson was asked to join Aerosmith on their European and North American tours on keyboard, acoustic guitarist and backing vocals. Of Johnson's inclusion into the band, Steven Tyler commented, "Buck Johnson came in out of the blue and purely by chance to our Aerosmith family, and we feel we really won the lottery. Big. Turns out he's much, much more than just a guy to sing harmony with. He plays slammin' guitar and is out of this world on anything keys. He's a true all-around talent, a huge asset to me and Aerosmith and also a great human being and friend."

In 2016, Johnson was asked to play keyboards and sing backing vocals on the Whitford-St. Holmes album, Reunion (2016). The group toured that year, opening for British hard rock band Whitesnake.

Johnson recorded keyboards on Joe Perry's album Sweetzerland Manifesto (2018), and continues to actively tour with Perry, Hollywood Vampires, and Aerosmith as keyboardist, acoustic guitarist and backing vocalist. Johnson has toured with Ringo Starr & His All-Starr Band substituting Edgar Winter during 2024.

== Solo Albums & Singles ==
Year	Album / Track	Artist	Label	Credits
2016	Enjoying The Ride	Buck Johnson	Spectra Music Group	Artist, Composer, Piano, Acoustic Guitar, Organ, Co-Producer and Engineer

== Guest appearances ==
Year	Album / Track	Artist	Label	Credits
2023	Road	Alice Cooper	earMusic	Keyboards
2019	Rise	Hollywood Vampires	earMusic	Keyboards, Piano, Vocals, Harpsichord, Acoustic Guitar
2018	Sweetzerland Manifesto	Joe Perry		Keyboards
2016	Reunion	Whitford-St.Holmes	Mailboat Records	Keyboards, Backing Vocals
2015	Rocks Donington 2015 (LIVE DVD/CD)	Aerosmith		Keyboards, Backing Vocals
2009	"You Came Along" (featured in Lifetime Network movie "Flying By")	Billy Ray Cyrus		Composer, Producer
2007	Whiskey Falls	Whiskey Falls	Midas Records	Composer, Keyboards, Vocals, Producer
2007, 2005	"Just Feel Better"	Carlos Santana	Arista	Composer
2007	Indiana	Jon McLaughlan	Island	B-3 Organ, Backing Vocals
2007	High School Musical 2	-	Disney	Keyboards
2007	Hannah Montana 2: Meet Miley Cyrus	-	Disney	Keyboards, Programming
2007	Everlife: "Daring To Be Different"	-	Disney	Keys, String Arrangements
2006	High School Musical	-	Disney	Keyboards, Programming, String Arrangements
2006, 2005	"Pop Star"	Aaron Carter	Jive Records, Madacy Records	Keyboards, Backing Vocals
2003	"One Better"	Aaron Carter	Jive Records	Keyboards, Backing Vocals
2003	The Flash Express	The Flash Express	Hit It Now Records	Organ
2003	The Cheetah Girls	-	Disney	Keyboards
2002	"All I Want For Christmas" (Classic Rock Christmas)	John Waite	Sanctuary Records	Keyboards
2002	"Over Easy"	O-Town	J Records	Keyboards
2000	WaterKing	Chris Laterzo		Backing Vocals
2000	Time Capsule-Best of Matthew Sweet	Matthew Sweet	Volcano 3	Organ
2000	Dirty Velvet Lie	Laura Satterfield		Keyboards
2000	Stories From The Bluebus	Jill Cohn		Keyboards
1999	Tal Bachman	Tal Bachman	Columbia Records	Keyboards, Backing Vocals
1997	American River	Chris Laterzo		B-3 Organ, Piano, Wurlitzer, Backing Vocals
1996	Rockin' Down The Highway: The Wildlife Concert	The Doobie Brothers	Sony	Backing vocals
