= The Best of The Joe Perry Project =

The Best of the Joe Perry Project

Compilation album by The Joe Perry Project
- Released: September 14, 1999
- Recorded: Various
- Genre: Hard rock
- Length: 75 min
- Label: Raven
- Producer: Ian McFarlane

Professional ratings
Review scores
Source	Rating
AllMusic	4/5 stars

The Best of the Joe Perry Project (subtitled The Music Still Does the Talking) is a compilation album by the Joe Perry Project, released in 1999.

== Track listing ==
1. "Let the Music Do the Talking" (from Let the Music Do the Talking)
2. "Conflict of Interest" (from Let the Music Do the Talking)
3. "Discount Dogs" (from Let the Music Do the Talking)
4. "Shooting Star" (from Let the Music Do the Talking)
5. "Break Song" (from Let the Music Do the Talking)
6. "Rockin' Train" (from Let the Music Do the Talking)
7. "Life at a Glance" (from Let the Music Do the Talking)
8. "Bone to Bone" (non-album B-side)
9. "East Coast, West Coast" (from I've Got the Rock'n'Rolls Again)
10. "I've Got the Rock'n'Rolls Again" (from I've Got the Rock'n'Rolls Again)
11. "No Substitute for Arrogance" (from I've Got the Rock'n'Rolls Again)
12. "Buzz Buzz" (from I've Got the Rock'n'Rolls Again)
13. "Soldier of Fortune" (from I've Got the Rock'n'Rolls Again)
14. "South Station Blues" (from I've Got the Rock'n'Rolls Again)
15. "Once a Rocker, Always a Rocker" (from Once a Rocker, Always a Rocker)
16. "Black Velvet Pants" (from Once a Rocker, Always a Rocker)
17. "King of the Kings" (from Once a Rocker, Always a Rocker)
18. "Bang a Gong" (from Once a Rocker, Always a Rocker)
19. "Walk With Me Sally" (from Once a Rocker, Always a Rocker)
20. "Never Wanna Stop" (from Once a Rocker, Always a Rocker)
