= Paul Santo =

American musician and producer

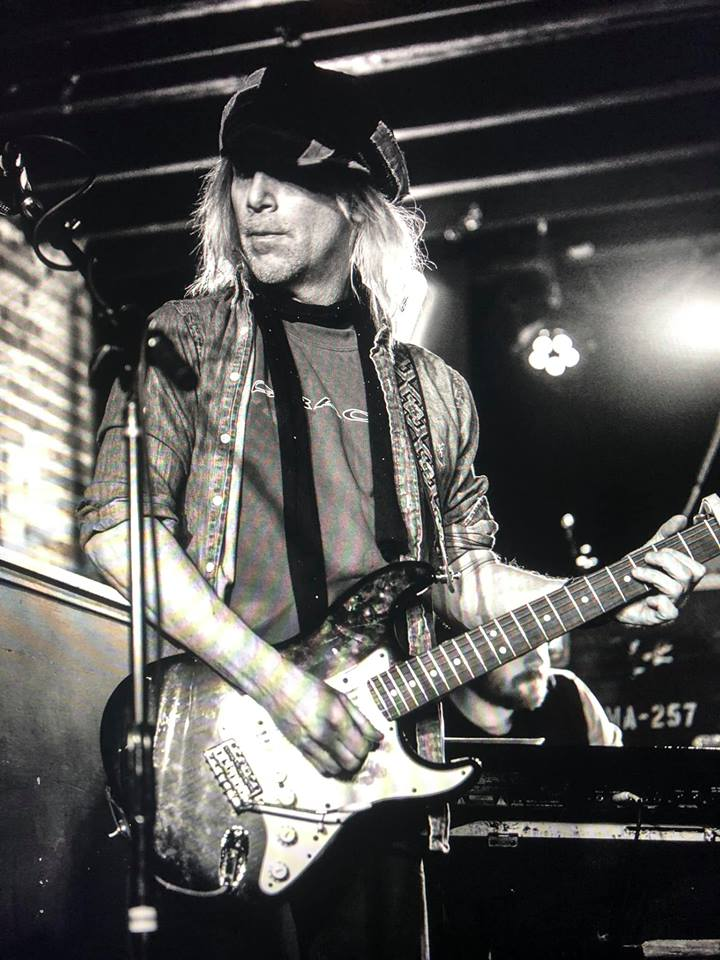
- On tour

Background information
- Born: Weymouth, Massachusetts, U.S.
- Genres: Hard rock; heavy metal; blues rock; country rock
- Occupations: Musician; Sound Engineer; Producer; Composer; Career Coach
- Instruments: Guitar; piano; drums
- Years active: 1980–present
- Website: www.paulsanto.com

Paul Santo is an American musician, songwriter, record producer, sound recording engineer and music career coach. He is best known in the music industry for his work in the recording studio, collaborating with multi-platinum recording artists such as Aerosmith, Eric Clapton, Neko Case, David Gilmour of Pink Floyd, Ringo Starr, and Ozzy Osbourne, more recently on songwriting and preproduction sessions involving Yungblud, Mati Schwartz, Adam Warrington and Joe Perry.

His work has also earned him several Grammy Award nominations.

In 2003, he won a Grammy Award for his work as a sound engineer and musician on the album Soy with Latin singer Alejandra Guzmán.

He also has a private consulting practice that mentors select individuals interested in pursuing careers in the music business as artists, music recording and production professionals, or session musicians.

His career in the music industry spans several decades, dating back to when he was just a teenager running his own recording studio in Weymouth, Massachusetts. It was there, on Boston's South Shore, that he crossed paths with another well-known musician from the area, Steven Tyler of Aerosmith. The two hit it off and immediately formed a long-term relationship, both personally and professionally. Santo eventually started working with the band, initially as Steven Tyler and Joe Perry's personal sound engineer and later with the entire band. He is credited on several of the band's studio albums as both a sound engineer and contributing musician.

During that time, he became known as one of the "Boneyard Boys," a small, tight-knit group of producers and collaborators involved in Aerosmith's creative process when recording albums.

His work on those recordings eventually gained him recognition in the music world and led to collaborations with other artists and producers in studios from Los Angeles to London.

His music career spans several decades and encompasses a full range of musical styles and genres, from rock and rhythm and blues to hip-hop and country.

Santo played guitar with Aerosmith during their "Boston Strong" concert at TD Garden in Boston, Massachusetts, filling in for Brad Whitford, who was unable to attend the show due to a family situation.

He also appeared on the recording of "Tears in Heaven," an "All-Star" benefit song for the victims of the devastating 2004 Indian Ocean earthquake. The project was organized by Ozzy Osbourne and his family, along with Mark Hudson.

== Musical collaboration ==
During his time in the music industry, Santo has worked (written, recorded, and/or performed) and continues to work with a wide variety of musically diverse recording artists. His collaborators range from Ozzy Osbourne to Michael Bolton, Alejandra Guzmán to Jonny Lang, as well as Eric Carmen, Cheap Trick, Neko Case, Steve Smith, Bon Jovi, LeAnn Rimes, Santana, and the Backstreet Boys.

He has also worked in the studio with acclaimed music producers such as Desmond Child (nominated for the Songwriters Hall of Fame in 2008), Jack Douglas (best known for working with The Who and John Lennon), and Grammy Award-winning record producer, songwriter, and musician Mark Hudson. Along with Santo, Mark Hudson is also a member of the infamous "Boneyard Boys," the small group of songwriters, musicians, and music producers responsible for Aerosmith's creative process.

Paul has also appeared on Ozzy Osbourne's album Under Cover (guitar), Ringo Starr's Ringo Rama (audio engineer, Pro Tools, guitar, and keyboards), and Michael Bolton's Only a Woman Like You (bass guitar, guitars, audio engineer, and Pro Tools), among many others as a musician, audio engineer, or both.

Santo has been nominated for several Grammy Awards over the years for his work as a sound recording engineer and studio musician. This includes a nomination for “Best Rock Album” with Aerosmith for the album Just Push Play, which debuted at #2 on the Billboard 200 and was certified platinum within a month of its release.

He also received a nomination that year for the Grammy Award for Best Rock Performance by a Duo or Group with Vocal for his work on "Jaded," which was a major Top 10 hit in the United States and around the world.

In 2009, he won a Latin Grammy Award for his collaboration with Alejandra Guzmán on her ninth studio album, Soy. It was also the first Latin Grammy for Guzmán, the singer/songwriter known as the “Bad Girl of Latin Pop,” in her 30-year career.

Other notable awards include a TEC Award from the NAMM Foundation for his work as a sound engineer for Sony Music.

The TEC Awards, often referred to as the "Oscars" of the pro audio and sound recording industry, honor creative luminaries such as Les Paul, Quincy Jones, Pete Townshend, Stevie Wonder, and many other notable artists for their historical and influential contributions to the music world.

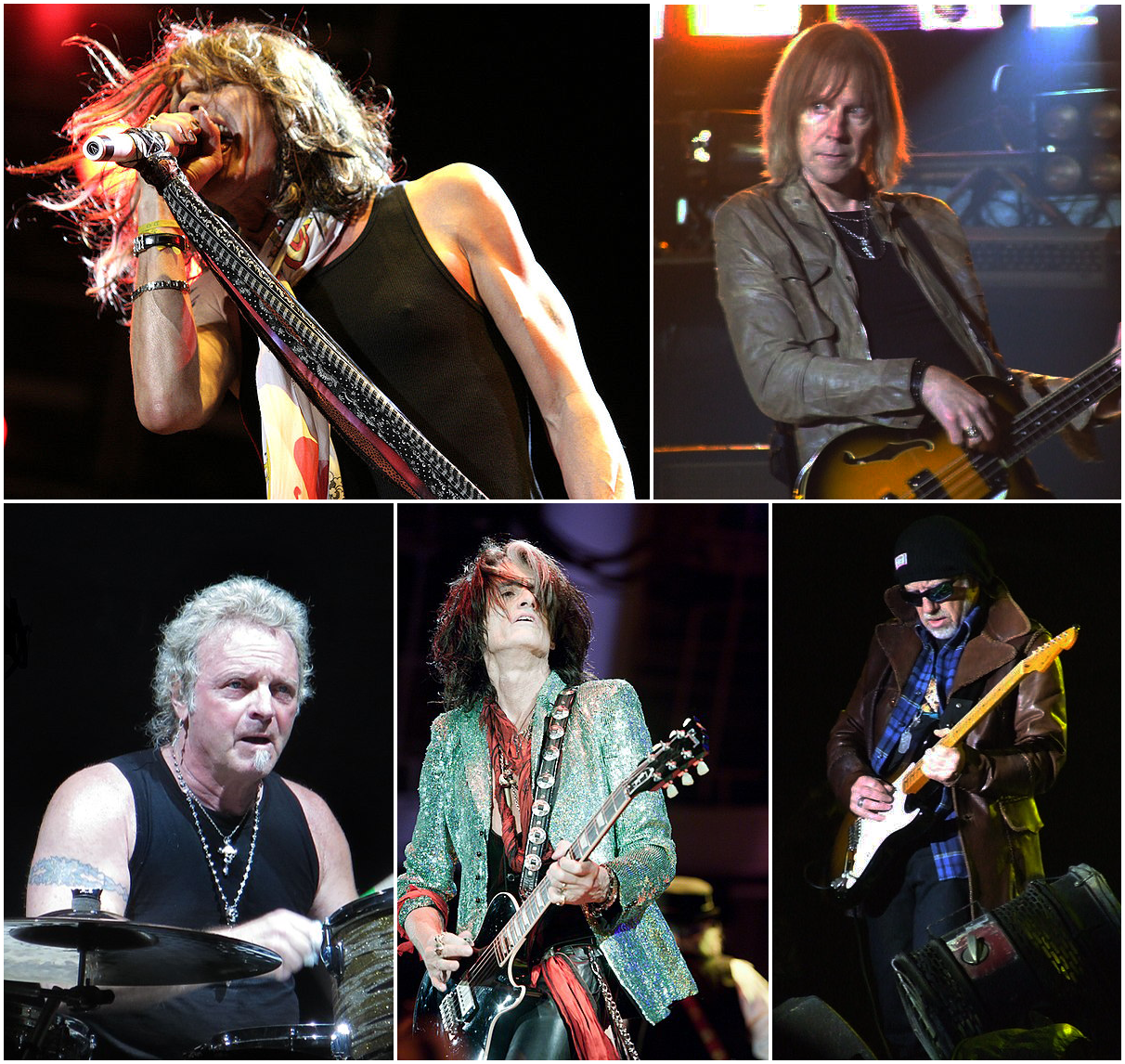
Aerosmith: Steven Tyler, Tom Hamilton, Joey Kramer, Joe Perry and Brad Whitford

=== With Aerosmith ===
The musical group Santo has been most associated with over the years is Aerosmith. His connection with the band dates back many years to when he first met Steven Tyler, who, like Santo, was also from the Boston area. They quickly formed a friendship, which eventually led to Santo working as the personal sound engineer for both Steven Tyler and Joe Perry. He also held the title of "house" sound engineer at the Pandora's Box recording studio.

As his relationships with the band members grew, so did his professional involvement.

When the band went into the studio to record the albums Just Push Play, Honkin' on Bobo, and Music from Another Dimension! for Geffen Records, he was brought in as a member of the creative and production teams, working on various aspects of the process from sound engineer to session musician.

His work also earned him a spot as a member of the “Boneyard Boys,” a tongue-in-cheek name for the small group of collaborators behind the band's creative process. The name references Joe Perry's state-of-the-art home recording studio, aptly named the “Boneyard,” where the majority of the recording process took place. Other members of the group include famed music producer Jack Douglas and Grammy Award-winning producer Mark Hudson.

Most recently, in 2018, Santo was back in the studio with Steven Tyler.

This time, he worked with the lead singer on his first collection of solo music. Santo was responsible for the entire musical score, recording all of the background music, and even performing in the accompanying movie documentary Out on a Limb, which chronicles Tyler and the making of his new music.

Tom Hamilton of Aerosmith

We actually have this guy, who's our pre-production assistant... A friend of ours named: Paul Santo.

He's such a brilliant musician... One of those kids that just got that "bolt of lightning..." You know, great on drums, great on guitar, great on piano... He's also the one who knows all about ProTools. He has helped me and Joey (Kramer) with preparing our bass and drum parts... During the writing process: Steven [Tyler], Joe [Perry], Marty Fredrickson and Mark Hudson would be recording, as they wrote, and these cool little demos would come out... Then, they would send them around to the rest of us. So we could prepare our take on it. It was great. Paul would come over and run the ProTools and help me record what I was practicing. So, I could hear what I was doing right, and doing wrong. He was not only able to run the ProTools for me, he would also give me suggestions that were essentially shortcuts to getting it all good. I think it's important to find a mentor, a teacher, or a Guru (whatever you want to refer to that person as.) They're not necessarily teaching you stuff you couldn't learn on your own... But, they shorten the process. Pointing things out that you might not see for six months or even six years. I recommend that to anyone playing an instrument, find someone who's a guru, like Paul is to us...I'm stopping just short of saying "take lessons,"here. I think a lot of teachers try to force you into a certain way of doing things, that you don't want to do – teachers sometimes do that.

You want someone that looks at what you do, sees that you have the potential to go in the right direction, and then show you how to find it, yourself.

--Christopher Buttner--

interview for GlobalBass.com

=== With Joe Perry ===
Santo is also a member of Joe Perry's solo band, The Joe Perry Project, where he plays rhythm guitar and keyboards. In 2009, he returned to the studio as an audio engineer with Joe Perry to work on Perry's fifth solo album, Have Guitar, Will Travel, after plans to record Aerosmith's fifteenth studio album with producer Brendan O'Brien fell through. The album, released on Perry's label, Roman Records, features fellow Joe Perry Project members David Hull (bass) and Marty Richards (drums). Santo is credited with playing Hammond organ, pipe organ, and percussion on the record. A new addition to the group was a young and relatively unknown German vocalist named Hagan Grohe, discovered on YouTube by Joe Perry's wife, Billie. Grohe sings on four tracks of the album.

The same group of musicians went on the road with Perry on the Have Guitar, Will Travel Tour. The band opened for national acts like Bad Company and Mötley Crüe, and also made an appearance as the musical guest on Late Night with David Letterman, performing "Slingshot" from the album. During the performance, Santo stepped out from behind the keyboards to play guitar, with Perry singing the lead vocals.

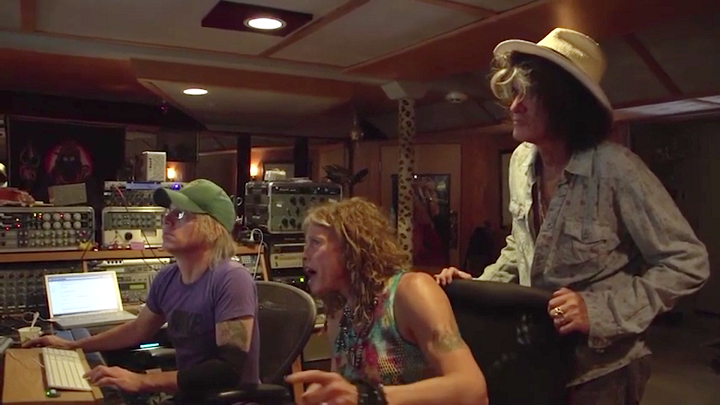
Paul Santo, Steven Tyler, and Joe Perry at the "Boneyard" Studio during the making of Aerosmith's "Music From Another Dimension"

At the beginning of 2012, Santo (Hammond organ), along with Aerosmith guitarist Brad Whitford (brass synth guitar), Warren Huart (acoustic guitar), Jack Douglas (drums), and Joe Perry (electric and slide guitars, bass, vocals), recorded a "very cool" rendition of the Bob Dylan classic "Man of Peace" for Chimes of Freedom in honor of Amnesty International USA.

They also performed the song on The Tonight Show with Jay Leno, with Santo once again playing guitar alongside Perry.

=== With Ringo Starr ===
When former Beatles drummer Ringo Starr returned to the studio to work on his latest album, Ringo Rama, he brought back his longtime friend and producer, Mark Hudson. Hudson, in turn, brought in Paul Santo, with whom he had previously worked on an Aerosmith album, as part of the production team.

This would be Ringo Starr's thirteenth studio album, and with the former Beatle, he collaborated with several established musicians for the recording.

Musicians such as David Gilmour, Eric Clapton, Willie Nelson, and Charlie Haden are just a few of the artists who contributed to the album.

Santo, working as the sound engineer, split his time between recording at Starr's studio in London, Rocca Bella, and Hudson's Whatinthewhatthe? Studios in Los Angeles.

The sessions were produced by Starr, who also created a documentary about the making of Ringo Rama.

Santo, an accomplished musician, also played multiple instruments on the album and co-wrote the song "I Think Therefore I Rock and Roll."

=== "Tears in Heaven" ===
Following the 2004 Indian Ocean tsunami that devastated Southeast Asia, Paul Santo joined an all-star cast of musicians that included Elton John, Rod Stewart, Steven Tyler, Ozzy Osbourne, Phil Collins, Ringo Starr, Gavin Rossdale, Gwen Stefani, Mary J. Blige, Pink, Kelly Osbourne, Katie Melua, Josh Groban, Andrea Bocelli, and members of Velvet Revolver: Slash, Duff McKagan, Matt Sorum, Dave Kushner, and Scott Weiland. The recording also featured actor Robert Downey Jr. performing a cover of Eric Clapton's song "Tears in Heaven."

The collaboration was organized by Mark Hudson, Ozzy Osbourne, his wife Sharon, and daughter Kelly Osbourne as a humanitarian response to the 2004 Indian Ocean earthquake. All sales from the recording benefited the victims and recovery efforts, with funds raised going to the Save the Children charity.

=== "Boston Strong" ===
In response to the tragic Boston Marathon bombing in April 2013, a lineup of high-profile acts with roots in the Boston area performed to a sold-out crowd at the TD Garden for a “Boston Strong” benefit concert for the victims of the attack.

Aerosmith headlined the show, which also featured local groups such as New Kids on the Block (with Donnie Wahlberg credited with the concert idea), The J. Geils Band featuring Peter Wolf, Jimmy Buffett, James Taylor, and many others.

Aerosmith, which formed in Boston in 1970, has always been synonymous with the city throughout their entire career, even being famously called the "Bad Boys from Boston" during their heyday. Members of the band raised their families in the area and still own homes in the suburbs of Boston.

Due to the urgent need, scheduling, and nature of the show, the promoters had only a matter of days to put the event together. The concert sold out all 19,600 seats in about 5 minutes. Unfortunately, due to a family member undergoing major surgery, Aerosmith guitarist Brad Whitford was unable to perform with the band at the event.

On very short notice and without any time for rehearsal, Paul Santo, who lives in the Boston area, stepped in with Aerosmith (who had just returned from a show in Singapore the day before) and took Whitford's place on stage with the rest of the band.

The concert was considered a great success for the "One Fund," which was established almost immediately after the tragic event. By the time of the concert, the fund had already raised $27 million for the victims.

== Composer for TV and film ==
- Steven Tyler documentary Out on a Limb: Composer, performer, Sound recording and reproduction
- History channel American Pickers (TV series): Composer, performer, Sound recording and reproduction
- Lifetime The March Sisters at Christmas (TV movie): Composer, performer, Sound recording and reproduction
- National Geographic Fool's Gold (TV show): Composer, performer, Sound recording and reproduction
- Discovery Channel Extreme Engineering (TV program): Composer, performer, Sound recording and reproduction
- PBS Nova (TV program) "Making Stuff": Composer, performer, Sound recording and reproduction
- Telemundo The Nate Berkus Show and "Mi Corazon Insiste" : Composer, performer, Sound recording and reproduction
- Animal Planet: Must Love Cats: Composer, performer, Sound recording and reproduction

== Influences ==
Santo's earliest musical influence was The Beatles. Although Frank Zappa and The Who were also significant influences later on, he was inspired by many varied sources. His guitar style, while diverse, tends to be rooted in an amalgam of English blues-rock players from the 1960s and 1970s and American country players who use the Fender Telecaster. His drumming is similarly influenced by British drummers like Ringo Starr and Keith Moon, as well as American soul and funk drummers.
