= Charlie Farren =

American singer

- Born: August 27, 1953 (age 73); Everett, Massachusetts, United States
- Genres: Rock, Pop
- Occupations: Musician, singer, songwriter, band manager
- Instruments: Vocals, guitar, piano
- Years active: 1972–present
- Labels: FMan Media, Warner Bros. Records, Atlantic Records, Columbia Records
- Website: www.charliefarren.com

Charlie Farren is an American musician, composer and guitarist best known as the lead singer of the rock bands The Joe Perry Project and Farrenheit. Farren recently launched his 16th release, most recently on his own FMan Media label, which was established in 1999, and been dedicated to managing his CD and publishing catalog.

Charlie's full-time musical career began in 1973 and continued until 1989 when he postponed his full-time music-career pursuit to raise a family. He continued to perform as a solo in top Boston-area listening room venues, and continued to write and release CD every 18 – 24 months. After a 24-year career at Hewlett Packard, Charlie retired and has resumed his full-time focus on creating original and compelling musical works. He has succeeded in re-establishing a successful career as a solo artist.

== Biography ==
=== Early years ===
Farren was born in the suburbs of Boston, Massachusetts to a family that regularly performed music around the home and in public. His eldest sister performed in a professional Gaelic and Jewish music band. His father played guitar, inspiring him to "dabble" with the instrument as a teenager.

=== Balloon and The Joe Perry Project ===
After performing in several cover and cover-plus-originals band incarnations in high school, Farren's first all-originals band Balloon formed in 1980. Just as Balloon was becoming popular and being pursued by Atlantic Records founder Ahmet Ertegun, thanks to local airplay of two of the band's songs, Farren was recruited to replace Ralph Morman as the frontman for Aerosmith lead guitarist Joe Perry's band The Joe Perry Project. The band recorded and toured for their second album I've Got the Rock'n'Rolls Again, which features a combination of Balloon songs and new tracks Farren and Perry wrote together.

=== The Enemy and Farrenheit ===
Farren's next band was The Enemy, a virtual rebirth of Balloon. After releasing a single and song for a compilation album, Ahmet Ertegun signed Farren. However, when Warner Bros. Records approached him, Farren and bassist David Hull (from The Joe Perry Project) signed to Warner's roster instead. Hull changed his last name to Heit and in 1986 the band took on the name Farrenheit (also written as Farren/Heit). The band had worldwide success including rotation on MTV and an opening slot on Boston's 75-stop sold-out American tour. The band's eponymous album was released in 1987 and spent 7 weeks on the Billboard 200, peaking at #179.

During this time, Farren was a guest artist on Nona Hendryx's The Heat and Bad Company's Fame and Fortune. He also performed alongside his sister, Robin Farren, in a band they named Farren, though Farrenheit fans referred to the band as The Charlie Farren Group to avoid confusion with female singer Ferron.

=== Hiatus from music ===
Farren took a hiatus from the music business in 1989 with the birth of his first child. He worked for over 22 years in a global business development role at various information technology corporations including Digital Equipment Corporation, Compaq and Hewlett-Packard.

=== Return to music ===
1995 saw the return of Farren to the music business when he founded an independent music management company to manage the career of hand-picked artists such as Jon Butcher. Over the next few years, he provided background vocals for Peter Wolf's album Long Line and Joey McIntyre's album Stay The Same.

Farren returned to performing and releasing music in 1999 and has since shared stages with The Kinks, Huey Lewis, Jethro Tull, Sammy Hagar, Eddie Money, Warren Zevon among others. His return to performing has also led to occasional Farrenheit reunion shows. He also continues to release both new and old recordings. His most recent release includes his completed version of an unfinished song originally written by deceased friend Brad Delp of the band Boston.

As “America’s Special Guest,” Farren has opened shows as an acoustic performer for Pat Benatar and Neil Giraldo, Three Dog Night, REO Speedwagon, Jay Leno, Foghat, The Fools!, as well as many others.

== Other projects ==
In 2001, Farren designed a guitar with Dean Campbell of Campbell American Guitars. The first production model (serial number 001) was purchased by Massachusetts billionaire Ernie Boch, Jr.

Since 2007, Farren has been a talent judge and mentor on the newly revived Boston-area television show Community Auditions.

In 2008, Farren recorded the song "You Are The Only One" with radio personality Candy O'Terry. The duo performed the song a number of times at public events including opening slots for Jim Brickman and at the Hatch Memorial Shell in Boston as part of a Making Strides Against Breast Cancer benefit show. It was the only independently released song to appear on national radio charts in 2009.

In 2010, Farren appeared with Jon Butcher as guests on Scorch’s PFG TV.

In 2014, Farren will be kicking off the 5th Season Premiere of on Stage with Mantis doing a solo set of his classic and new songs.

In 2015 he joined the local television show Community Auditions as a member of the panel of three judges. The show is aired on WCVB Channel 5.

== Personal life ==
Farren married in October 1981 and has three children. His daughter, Veronica Farren, is an actress and model who has sung background vocals on several of his tracks and performed on stage with him in recent years.

== Discography ==
=== With Balloon ===
- Live Bootleg (1999) (recorded in 1980)

=== With The Joe Perry Project ===
- I've Got The Rock'n'Rolls Again (1981)
- Best of Joe Perry Project: The Music Still Does The Talkin (2001) (compilation)

=== With The Enemy ===
- "America Rocks" (1985)
- "Sally's Got A Poker Face" (1985)

=== With Farrenheit ===
- Farrenheit (1987)
- First (1989) (band's first recording)
- Raise The Roof (1999) (includes songs originally recorded for the band's sophomore album)
- Greasetown (1999)
- Live At The Roxy (2003)

=== As Charlie Farren ===
- Deja Blue (1999)
- World Gone Wild (2002)
- Four Letter World (2003)
- Live At Club Passim (2003)
- Old And Young (2007)
- Retrospective: Live At The Regent Theatre (2008) (CD/DVD package)
- Tuesday (2013)

=== With Farren Butcher Inc ===
- FBI (2011)
