= Joe Perry (album) =

Studio album by Joe Perry
- Released: May 3, 2005
- Recorded: 2005
- Genre: Hard rock, instrumental rock
- Length: 51:22
- Label: Sony BMG
- Producer: Joe Perry; Paul Caruso (co-producer)

Joe Perry chronology
The Best of the Joe Perry Project (1999)	Joe Perry (2005)	Have Guitar, Will Travel (2009)

Professional ratings
Review scores
Source	Rating
AllMusic	2.5/5 stars
Rolling Stone	link
USA Today	3/4 stars

Joe Perry is the first solo album by Aerosmith guitarist Joe Perry, released on May 3, 2005, on Sony BMG. Joe Perry is his first solo album without The Joe Perry Project. The album peaked at No. 110 at the Billboard charts. Joe Perry was released as a regular CD and a DualDisc.

Joe Perry performed all guitars, bass, keyboards and vocals on the record leaving only the drums and percussion to the album's co-producer, Paul Caruso.

This album contains a cover of "The Crystal Ship", a song by The Doors.

== Track listing ==
1. "Shakin' My Cage"
2. "Hold on Me"
3. "Pray for Me"
4. "Can't Compare"
5. "Lonely"
6. "Crystal Ship"
7. "Talk Talkin'"
8. "Push Comes to Shove"
9. "Twilight"
10. "Ten Years"
11. "Vigilante Man"
12. "Dying to Be Free"
13. "Mercy"

=== DVD (DualDisc only) ===
- Entire album in 5.1 Surround Sound
- Exclusive in-the-studio, behind-the-scenes and interview footage
- Exclusive UMixIt tracks for a unique interactive computer experience

== Personnel ==
- Joe Perry - guitars, bass guitar, synth guitar, keys, lead and backing vocals (except in "Talk Talkin'")
- Paul Caruso - drums, hand percussion, drum programming
- The Bonaires (Billie Paulette Montgomery Perry (Joe's wife), Roman Perry (Joe's younger son), Paul Caruso and Jim Survis) - backing vocals on "Talk Talkin'
- Chris Noyes - analog synth on "Ten Years"
- All lyrics by Joe Perry except "Crystal Ship" (The Doors) and "Vigilante Man" (Woody Guthrie)
- Produced by Joe Perry
- Co-Produced by Paul Caruso
- Recorded and engineered at The Boneyard by Paul Caruso
- Cover picture by Ross Halfin

Three of the songs from the album ("Mercy", "Shakin' My Cage" and "Talk Talkin'") are included as playable bonus tracks in Guitar Hero: Aerosmith.

== Charts ==
Chart (2005)	Peak position
US Billboard 200	110
