= Wally Brandt =

American singer-songwriter

- Birth name: Walter Anthony Brandt
- Born: Jersey City, New Jersey, U.S.
- Genres: Pop rock, southern rock, country, country rock, Production music
- Occupation(s): Guitarist, Songwriter, Producer
- Years active: 2001–present
- Formerly of: Seven and the Sun; Whiskey Falls
- Website: www.we3kings.com

Wally Brandt (born Walter Anthony Brandt) is an American guitarist, producer, and songwriter, best known for his work with Pop rock band Seven and the Sun, Country music band Whiskey Falls and Production music company We3Kings Music.

== Career ==
=== Seven and the Sun ===
Brant was a member of the band Seven and the Sun, contributing guitar and vocals. The band was best known for the hit song "Walk With Me". Their recording of "Jump (The Velvet Rope)" was featured in the Summer Catch#Soundtrack, "Back to the Innocence" became the theme song for NBC's "The John Walsh Show".

=== Whiskey Falls ===
After Seven and the Sun disbanded, Brandt and Seven Williams moved to Nashville to write and produce music for country artists under their Production music company We3Kings Music. Brandt's twin brother Bill joined them in the recording studio as songwriter and producer for their self-titled album. The band was featured in several music magazines, toured, and made appearances on national television and at several NASCAR pre-race events, and in television commercials. The group and their song "Load Up the Bases (The Baseball Song)" are featured in television promos for Atlanta Braves and Colorado Rockies, and the song also charted at No. 55 on the country music charts during the 2007 and 2008 World Series. One of their songs became the theme for the Mark Burnett Show.

=== Music production ===
Brandt and partners Bill Brandt and Williams have moved their music production company We3Kings to Los Angeles, where they have composed and recorded theme songs for many television shows, including NBC's "The John Walsh Show", Fox's "Tru Calling" and "The Simple Life" and ABC's "The Two-Timer" as well as NBC's "Minute to Win It" and BRAVO's "Tabatha’s Salon Makeover" to TLC's "Sarah Palin’s Alaska", Lifetime's "Dance Moms" and "Ryan & Tatum: The O’Neals "on OWN. They have also written cues and promos for several TV shows including NBC's "Las Vegas", "Starting Over", "Access Hollywood", "Entertainment Tonight" and ABC's "Extreme Makeover:Home Edition".

Along with writing music and producing for Seven and the Sun and Whiskey Falls, Wally Brandt and We3Kings also developed the band Full Blown Rose and have recorded for several new artists and bands. In 2004, Wally Brandt and fellow We3Kings composers won the BMI TV Award for Song of the Year for "The Simple Life" starring Paris Hilton and Nicole Richie. In 2007, the same group won the ASCAP TV Award for Song of the Year for "Shark", starring [James Woods].

== Discography ==
=== Albums ===
Back to the Innocence (Seven and the Sun album) 2002, CD (Atlantic Records)
Whiskey Falls (album) 2007, CD (Midas Records)
