= Paul Caruso (drummer) =

American drummer

Paul Caruso (1 June 1955 – 3 May 2006) was a drummer who played for the Boston band The Atlantics.

Caruso joined the Atlantics in 1979, as a replacement for Ray 'Boy' Fernandes, and played on the group's best selling record Lonelyhearts. He co-produced and played a drum instrumental on the song "Mercy" from Joe Perry's album Joe Perry which was nominated for a Grammy. He also appeared on Late Night with Conan O'Brien as a drummer for Perry roughly a year before his death. Caruso was also an engineer on two Aerosmith albums, Just Push Play in 2001 and Honkin' on Bobo in 2004.

Caruso had a wife, Susan, and they had two sons, Christian and Zachary. He collapsed and died aged 50 at his home in Kingston.
