= Buck Johnson =

Buck Johnson may refer to:

- Buck Johnson (basketball) (born 1964), American basketball player
- Buck Johnson (musician), American musician

== See also ==
- Bunk Johnson (1889–1949), American jazz trumpeter
