= I've Got the Rock'n'Rolls Again =

I've Got the Rock & Rolls Again

Studio album by The Joe Perry Project
- Released: 22 June 1981
- Venue: Boston Opera House with the Record Plant Mobile
- Studio: The Warehouse, Waltham, MA
- Genre: Hard rock
- Length: 37:14
- Label: Columbia
- Producer: Bruce Botnick

The Joe Perry Project chronology
Let the Music Do the Talking (1980)	I've Got the Rock & Rolls Again (1981)	Once a Rocker, Always a Rocker (1983)

Professional ratings
Review scores
Source	Rating
AllMusic	3/5 stars
Collector's Guide to Heavy Metal	8/10

I've Got the Rock & Rolls Again is the second studio album by the Joe Perry Project. It charted at No. 100 in the Billboard 200 albums chart. The songs "Listen to the Rock" and "East Coast, West Coast" were written by Charlie Farren and were local hits for his previous band, Balloon.

== Track listing ==
Side one

1. "East Coast, West Coast" (Charlie Farren) – 3:06
2. "No Substitute for Arrogance" (Joe Perry, Farren) – 3:25
3. "I've Got the Rock 'n' Rolls Again" (Perry, Farren) – 4:34
4. "Buzz Buzz" (David Hull, Andrew Resnick, Charlie Karp) – 3:41
5. "Soldier of Fortune" (Perry) – 3:05

Side two

1. "TV Police" (Perry, Farren) – 4:11
2. "Listen to the Rock" (Farren) – 3:20
3. "Dirty Little Things" (Hull) – 3:42
4. "Play the Game" (Perry, Farren) – 5:20
5. "South Station Blues" (Perry) – 4:10

== Personnel ==
Band members

- Joe Perry – guitars, backing vocals, lead vocals on tracks 5 and 10
- Charlie Farren – rhythm guitar, lead vocals
- David Hull – bass, backing vocals, lead vocals on tracks 4 and 8
- Ronnie Stewart – drums, percussion

Production

- Bruce Botnick – producer
- Rik Pekkonen – engineer, mixing at Oceanway Studios, Los Angeles
- Jack Crymes, James Sandweiss, Jim Pace – engineers
- David Bianco, Jim Scott – assistant engineers
- Bernie Grundman – mastering at A&M Studios, Los Angeles
- John Berg – album design
