= Shela (song) =

1985 single by Aerosmith

Single by Aerosmith

from the album Done with Mirrors
- B-side: "Gypsy Boots"
- Released: November 1985 (in United States only)
- Recorded: 1985
- Length: 4:32
- Label: Geffen
- Songwriter(s): Steven Tyler; Brad Whitford
- Producer(s): Ted Templeman

Aerosmith singles chronology
"Let the Music Do the Talking" (1985)	"Shela" (1985)	"Darkness" (1986)

"Shela" is a song by American hard rock band Aerosmith, the fifth song on the band's 1985 album Done with Mirrors. The songwriting credits are credited to all members of Aerosmith. Both guitarists Joe Perry and Brad Whitford take turns in soloing, with the main riff played by Brad Whitford.

Although "Let the Music Do the Talking" was the first track from the album to be released to United States radio stations (as a promo-only single), "Shela" was the album's first commercially released single in the US, reaching #20 on Billboard's Mainstream Rock Tracks chart in late-1985.

Despite the song being released as a single in the US, a music video was not created for it.
