= Whitford/St. Holmes =

Studio album by Whitford/St. Holmes
- Released: August 1981
- Studio: Axis Studios, Atlanta
- Genre: Hard rock
- Length: 40:10
- Label: Columbia
- Producer: Tom Allom

Whitford/St. Holmes chronology
Whitford/St. Holmes (1981)	Reunion (2016)

Singles from Whitford/St. Holmes
- 1. "Shy Away" Released: 1981

Professional ratings
Review scores
Source	Rating
AllMusic	3/5 stars

Whitford/St. Holmes is the first album by the hard rock collaboration of the American musicians Brad Whitford and Derek St. Holmes (of Aerosmith and Ted Nugent respectively), released in 1981.

== History ==
In 1981, Whitford left Aerosmith. He teamed up with St. Holmes, who had previously played with Ted Nugent, to form "Whitford/St. Holmes", together with Dave Hewitt and Steve Pace who were later replaced by bass guitarist Chase Chitty and the drummer Larue Riccio (Baby and the Pacifiers). They toured the southeastern United States and performed before small audiences.

In 1981, they recorded this album. It was followed by a tour but neither the album nor the tour had any big success. In 1983, Whitford reunited with Joe Perry to play live at several shows with his band The Joe Perry Project. In 1984, both Whitford and Perry returned to Aerosmith to record Done with Mirrors, released in 1985 on Geffen Records. St. Holmes worked with Nugent again sporadically in the following years.

Their second album, Reunion, was sold during their November 2015 Reunion Tour. It was officially released in 2016 by Mailboat Records.

== Track listing ==
1. "I Need Love" – 3:18
2. "Whiskey Woman" – 3:51
3. "Hold On" – 2:59
4. "Sharpshooter" – 5:30
5. "Every Morning" – 4:39
6. "Action" – 3:45
7. "Shy Away" – 4:12
8. "Does It Really Matter?" – 4:26
9. "Spanish Boy" – 4:09
10. "Mystery Girl" – 3:22

== Personnel ==
- Brad Whitford – lead guitar
- Derek St. Holmes – lead vocals, guitar
- Dave Hewitt – bass guitar
- Steve Pace – drums

Production

- George Pappas – engineering
- Tom Allom – producer

== Appearances in other media ==
- "Sharpshooter" was re-released on the Aerosmith compilation album Pandora's Box in 1991.
