= Seven Volpone =

Entrepreneur, business executive, singer, songwriter and record producer (born 1972)

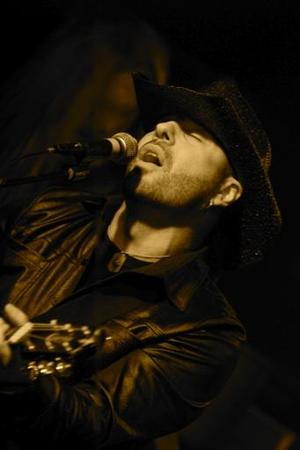
- Volpone performing in 2018
- Born: Keith Volpone; March 4, 1972 (age 54); New York City, U.S.
- Other names: Seven Williams-Volpone; Keith Volpone; Keith Williams-Volpone
- Occupations: Entrepreneur; singer; songwriter; record producer; businessman
- Years active: 1999–present
- Musical career
- Labels: Atlantic; Midas Records; 1337 Records
- Formerly of: Seven and the Sun; Whiskey Falls

Keith Volpone (born March 4, 1972), also known as Seven Volpone, is an entrepreneur, business executive, singer, songwriter and record producer. Volpone is the current CEO of Big Block Capital Group and Big Block Media Group.

== Early life and education ==
Volpone was born in The Bronx, New York City, to Rosemarie and William Volpone. He attended Madonna Catholic School for middle school until he was 13 years old. Volpone then moved to Secaucus, New Jersey, where he attended Secaucus High School. Volpone then attended New Jersey City University in Jersey City, New Jersey.

== Music career ==
Volpone and his band Seven and the Sun were signed to Atlantic Records in 1999. The group's single "Walk with Me" (2002) hit number 38 on the Billboard Adult Top 40, number 27 on the Billboard Mainstream Top 50 and number 40 on the Billboard Top 40 Tracks chart. The track was also featured in the Columbia Pictures film America's Sweethearts.

He co-founded the music, marketing and branding company of We3Kings in 2003. Under the company he oversaw the creation of television and brand themes, and music for television shows that include: Dance Moms, Shark Tank, Extreme Makeover: Home Edition, Tru Calling, The Simple Life, Toddlers & Tiaras, Here Comes Honey Boo Boo and The Steve Harvey Show. He also scored music for Diary of a Wimpy Kid: Dog Days and Tinker Bell.

In 2007, Volpone went on to found and front the country group Whiskey Falls; the group's songs "Last Train Running" and "Falling into You" as well as "Load up the Bases" charted on the Billboard top 100 charts. With Whiskey Falls, Volpone developed a multi-year brand and integration partnership between Whiskey Falls and AAMCO Transmissions. The band went on to create original music for Mark Burnett's Toughest Cowboy on the Spike TV network. Whiskey Falls was also featured on Jimmy Kimmel Live!, Days of Our Lives, CBS Morning News, NASCAR and Extra.

In 2010, Volpone worked with Agency for the Performing Arts, television production company Collins Avenue Productions and his former partners at We3Kings on the music for the reality television show, Dance Moms. Volpone also appears in the season finale of season one.

== Business career ==
In 2014, Volpone and his partner founded a consulting firm named Push-Point Management Group. Through Push-Point, Volpone consulted for several leading media companies including ESL, Turtle Entertainment, Richard Reid Productions, Mike Love of The Beach Boys, Maestro, & TV4

In January 2016, Volpone was engaged by Turtle Entertainment and ESL, as a Sr. Executive Adviser charged with developing non-endemic brand strategy & music and lifestyle integrations. Volpone worked closely with Executive chairman Steven Roberts to help manage the partnership between Fuse (TV channel), Columbia Records and artists Krewella for the first ESL music performance at the ESL One: New York 2016 at the Barclays Center in NY. Volpone's work with ESL includes the launch of 1337 Records, the signing of the band Leet Mob and deployment of ESL owned publishing assets and themes such as "My Story" used in IEM events and ESL broadcasts.

In January 2017, Volpone accepted the role of CEO for Big Block Media, Big Block Entertainment and Big Block Capital Group.
