= Inside Dish =

- Genre: Cooking show
- Written by: Stephen Crisman; Ted Nelson
- Directed by: Stephen Crisman
- Presented by: Rachael Ray
- Country of origin: United States
- Original language: English
- No. of seasons: 1
- No. of episodes: 19

Production
- Production company: Crisman Films

Original release
- Network: Food Network
- Release: November 5, 2004 – May 13, 2005

Inside Dish with Rachael Ray, hosted by Rachael Ray was a hybrid cooking/talk show on the Food Network. In each episode Ray had a celebrity guest with whom she cooked or ate with at a restaurant. It premiered on November 5, 2004. The show is no longer in production.

== List of celebrity guests ==
- Dennis Franz
- Morgan Freeman
- Tony Danza
- Cheech Marin
- Mariel Hemingway
- Brett Ratner
- Mekhi Phifer
- Jill Hennessy
- Raven-Symoné
- Gloria Estefan
- Aisha Tyler
- Adam Carolla
- Joe Perry
- Daisy Fuentes
- Penn & Teller
- Rick Nielsen
- Mario Cantone
