= Let the Music Do the Talking =

Studio album by The Joe Perry Project
- Released: March 1980
- Recorded: December 1979 – January 1980
- Studio: The Hit Factory, New York City
- Genre: Hard rock, blues rock
- Length: 36:39
- Label: Columbia
- Producer: Jack Douglas and Joe Perry

The Joe Perry Project chronology
Let the Music Do the Talking (1980)	I've Got the Rock'n'Rolls Again (1981)

Let the Music Do the Talking is the first of three studio albums by The Joe Perry Project, released in 1980. It was the band's most successful, selling approximately 250,000 copies in the United States. The title track was later re-recorded in by Aerosmith on their 1985 reunion album Done With Mirrors, albeit with a slightly different melody and Steven Tyler-penned lyrics.

== Background ==
Fed up with the slow pace of the recording of Night in the Ruts and frustrated with the band's precarious financial situation, Perry left Aerosmith in the spring of 1979. He recruited Aerosmith's former producer Jack Douglas and chose Ralph Morman for lead singer, who Perry had previously heard performing in a band called Daddy Warbux. The group was rounded out by bassist David Hull and drummer Ronnie Stewart. "The contrast between the tortuous ordeal of recording Aerosmith and the seamless groove that characterized the Project was remarkable," Perry later recalled.

== Recording and composition ==
Considering Aerosmith's struggles, Columbia Records was initially hesitant to give Perry a solo deal, but he assured them he could turn in an album in "five or six weeks." In his 2014 autobiography Rocks, the guitarist states that the songs were largely autobiographical:

"Let the Music Do the Talking" – the title track – spoke for itself. It was just how I was feeling. I didn’t need to talk. Didn’t need to explain how much I wanted to be on my own timetable, free to work at my own speed, which was pretty fast. "Conflict of Interest" was inspired by my feelings about the shady side of the record business. I was going straight back to my roots, as demonstrated by the R&B-heavy "Rockin’ Train." Songs like "Life at a Glance" and "Ready on the Firing Line" were constructed around riffs that had been bouncing around my brain for months.

== Reception ==
Professional ratings
Review scores
Source	Rating
AllMusic	4/5 stars
Collector's Guide to Heavy Metal	10/10

Let the Music Do the Talking received generally favorable reviews from critics. Greg Prato of AllMusic wrote that "maybe because he wanted to show his former band mates that he could succeed without them, the performances were extremely inspired, while the songwriting was sharp and focused... A truly great and underrated record, Let the Music Do the Talking could have been a classic Aerosmith release if the drugs hadn't split the band apart." Canadian journalist Martin Popoff remarked how in comparison with Aerosmith albums Let the Music Do the Talking has "a greater emphasis on both control and funkiness, yet still exuding tons of warmth and larger-than-life riffery", and praised Perry for his "eccentric, concentric interpretations of the blues."

Let the Music Do the Talking proved to be The Joe Perry Project's highest charting album, peaking at #47 on Billboard.

== Track listing ==
All tracks are written by Joe Perry, except where noted.

Side one
No.	Title	Writer(s)	Length
1.	"Let the Music Do the Talking"		4:42
2.	"Conflict of Interest"		4:43
3.	"Discount Dogs"	Perry, Ralph Morman	3:42
4.	"Shooting Star"		3:39
5.	"Break Song" (Instrumental)	Perry, David Hull, Ronnie Stewart	2:06

Side two
No.	Title	Writer(s)	Length
6.	"Rockin' Train"	Perry, Morman	6:02
7.	"The Mist Is Rising"		6:30
8.	"Ready on the Firing Line"		3:54
9.	"Life at a Glance"		2:41

== Personnel ==
The Joe Perry Project

- Ralph Morman – vocals
- Joe Perry – guitars, lead vocals on tracks 2, 4, 7 and 9, backing vocals, bass synthesizer on track 1, percussion, producer, cover concept
- David Hull – bass guitar, bass synthesizer on track 8, backing vocals
- Ronnie Stewart – drums, percussion

Additional musicians

- Rocky Donahue – percussion

Production

- Jack Douglas – percussion, producer, mixing at The Record Plant, New York
- Lee DiCarlo – engineer, mixing
- Chris Tergesen, Julie Last – assistant engineers
- Greg Calbi – mastering at Sterling Sound, New York
- John Berg – cover concept
- Jerry Abramowitz, Ron Pownall – photography
- David Krebs, Steve Leber – management
