= Done with Mirrors =

Studio album by Aerosmith
- Released: November 4, 1985
- Recorded: Early 1985
- Studios: Fantasy, Berkeley; Power Station, New York City; Can-Am, Tarzana
- Genre: Hard rock
- Length: 35:42
- Label: Geffen
- Producer: Ted Templeman

Aerosmith chronology
Rock in a Hard Place (1982)	Done with Mirrors (1985)	Permanent Vacation (1987)

Singles from Done with Mirrors
- 1. "Let the Music Do the Talking" Released: September 16, 1985; 2. "Shela" Released: October 31, 1985; 3. "Darkness" Released: 1985; 4. "My Fist Your Face" Released: November 9, 1985

Done with Mirrors is the eighth studio album by American rock band Aerosmith, released on November 4, 1985. It marked the return to the band of guitarists Joe Perry, who left in 1979 and Brad Whitford, who departed in 1981. The band's first album on Geffen Records, it was intended as their ‘comeback’. However, the record failed to live up to commercial expectations despite positive reviews.

== Background ==
Brad Whitford revealed that producer Ted Templeman wanted to capture the band's aggressive, "out of control freight train" sound by removing the red light indicating that recording was underway (a technique he had used to capture Van Halen's sound). Templeman told the band to run through the songs in the studio and recorded them without their knowledge. Whitford referred to the nerves generated when knowingly recording songs as "the red light blues".

"I had a great time making that record," Templeman told The Washington Post's Geoff Edgers, "and Steven was one of the most amazing guys. But we had to do that record in Berkeley because they didn't want those guys to score (drugs). They didn't want them to be in L.A. or San Francisco. I wasn't familiar with the board. As a producer, if you know your room and the mic preamps, you know how things are going to sound. I don't think I made Joey's drums sound as good as they could have or Joe's guitar."

Joe Perry recalled recording in a 2022 interview: "[...] with the rest of the songs, there was a vibe to them where they were just raw and dirty. I still wish I could have maybe polished a few more things or maybe put a couple more overdubs on it, but all in all, I think it did what it was supposed to do. I think it kind of showed me what we needed to do, what we were, and where we needed to be for the next one. I think we had to do that record to get to the next step and really take ourselves out of the usual way we were writing and recording."

"Let the Music Do the Talking" was a rerecording of the title track from the first album by the Joe Perry Project, with altered lyrics and melody. According to Chuck Eddy, Aerosmith's version is tougher than the original, "while still appropriately letting Joe's guitar talk–like an elephant, no less-–while Tyler discussed somebody being his 'brand-new drug'." The music of "The Reason a Dog" have been compared to the Police's "Invisible Sun" (1981), while its lyrics espouse "tail-wagging canines teaching male-nagging spouses life lessons". Elsewhere, "Shela" is a syncopated song which, according to Eddy, "almost goes disco, at least in the mid-1980s, ZZ Top sense of the word", while "Gypsy Boots" rides an AC/DC-esque riff until a switch to bass vamps near its conclusion. The final songs on the vinyl edition are the blues song "She's on Fire" and the fast, straightforward R&B song "The Hop", featuring blues harp, whereas cassette and CD versions conclude with "Darkness", a dirge that Eddy says connects "foreboding old Aerosmith alley crawls like 'Seasons of Wither' with more lucrative Tin Pan Alley moves to come."

Viacom (MTV & VH1) executive Doug Herzog recalled that, after this album, "Aerosmith was done… They were a little bit of a joke." Eddy speculated that the album's failure may have been due to the "kick-the-coke-habit pun" of the title, or the lead single and first song being a remake of a five-year-old Joe Perry Project song. However, they would revive their career in 1986 with a landmark remake of 1975's "Walk This Way" with hip-hop group Run DMC, followed by an album that would eventually go 5× Platinum – Permanent Vacation – in 1987.

Done with Mirrors is the last Aerosmith record written without the aid of outside songwriters, as of Music from Another Dimension!

== Packaging and title ==
In keeping with the title, all the text (bar the catalog number and UPC) on the original releases, including all text in the booklet of the first CD pressing, were written back to front, to be read by holding it to a mirror. Re-releases flip the artwork so it can be read without a mirror, additionally adding the band's logo. As a result, the original CD (which came in a longbox) is a collector's item.

The title refers both to illusions that are "done with mirrors", and the laying out of drugs such as cocaine, traditionally snorted off a mirror.

== Reception ==
Professional ratings
Review scores
Source	Rating
AllMusic	4/5 stars
Christgau's Record Guide	B+
Collector's Guide to Heavy Metal	7/10
The Daily Vault	A
Encyclopedia of Popular Music	3/5 stars
The Great Rock Discography	6/10
Kerrang!	5/5 stars
The Rolling Stone Album Guide	2/5 stars

Done with Mirrors received mostly positive reviews. In The Village Voice, Robert Christgau wrote that, given the "bad records" Aerosmith had made in the preceding decade, he did not expect to enjoy the "touching reunion" of Done with Mirrors, but praised it "against all odds", saying: "if you can stand the crunch, you'll find more get-up-and-go on the first side than on any dozen random neogarage EP's." Also reviewing it for The Village Voice, Eddy considered it superior to other then-recent comeback albums by Tina Turner, the Clash, Stevie Wonder, Aretha Franklin, Bob Dylan and John Fogerty. Rolling Stone reviewer Jimmy Guterman wrote that unlike the best heavy metal albums, Done with Mirrors is "the work of burned-out lugheads whose lack of musical imagination rivals their repugnant lyrics." He found "Let the Music Do the Talking" to be an enjoyable, derivative opening song, but criticised the remaining songs for their "vicious sexism" as well as Perry's "rote and lazy" guitar leads and Tyler's "arena shouts".

Stephen Thomas Erlewine of AllMusic called it the finest Aerosmith album since Rocks (1976), saying that unlike its immediate predecessors, Done with Mirrors is "powered by the same smart-assed lyrics and filthy guitars that formed the core of Aerosmith's best songs." He also considers it superior to Permanent Vacation (1987), the album that revived the group's commercial and critical fortunes. In The Great Rock Discography (2006), Martin C. Strong describes Done with Mirrors as Aerosmith's "best effort since the 70's heyday," while The Rough Guide to Rock (1999) contributor Michael Andrews wrote that it "signalled a return to form", highlighting "Let the Music Do the Talking" as its finest track. Colin Larkin, in The Encyclopedia of Popular Music (1997), called the album "a tentative first step" for Aerosmith, following the classic lineup's reformation but prior to Tyler's and Perry's drug rehabilitation programmes and the success of "Walk This Way" and Permanent Vacation.

Reviewing the album for the book Aerosmith (2011), Eddy deems it to be "the last uncompromisingly hard-rocking album Aerosmith made". He finds it superior to Rock in a Hard Place (1982), its predecessor, because Done with Mirrors is "almost entirely the guitarists' and the rhythm section's record, all big, fat chunky funky boxy boogie riffs. The songs are too concise to get complicated, and they don't need to. There may be no other Aerosmith album that so fully opts for rhythm over melody. Which isn't to say the songs aren't catchy, just that the band's Beatles-pomp side is nowhere to be found." He considers the opening two songs to be the best and says, while the remaining songs are not "earthshaking", the record "just keeps on punching."

=== Band opinions ===
On VH1 Classic's That Metal Show, Joey Kramer expressed his dislike of Done with Mirrors, claiming the band "never really finished it". Joe Perry was similarly dismissive: "Done with Mirrors, as far as I'm concerned, is our least inspired record. But I've heard fans really like it so I'm not gonna stand there and tell 'em, 'No, it sucks.' We had to do that record to get to the next one so it served its purpose. I just don't think it's up to the standard of some of our others." In 1987, Perry said that "Done with Mirrors was the best record we could do at the time, but it wasn't the best record we can do. We should have had a month with those tracks as they sit on that record, instead of having one week which is what we had."

=== Accolades ===
In 1991, Eddy ranked Done with Mirrors at number 409 in his list of the 500 best heavy metal albums. Believing the record was the only mid-1980s musical 'comeback' that lived up to its hype, he highlighted the chaotic opening song where Perry's guitar works similarly to a horn section, "My Fist Your Face" for its "hyperbolically misogynous rap about teenybop hookers and Betty Boop", the AC/DC, Police and ZZ Top touchstones on the succeeding songs, the belated "show-offy" ending of "Gypsy Boots", and the "Chuck Berry-gone-heavy danceability" of "The Hop". He added: "Rocking too hard for AOR, it died on the charts, and the band got scared", leading to their commercial reinvention on Permanent Vacation (1987).

== Track listing ==
No.	Title	Writer(s)	Length
1.	"Let the Music Do the Talking" (The Joe Perry Project cover)	Joe Perry	3:48
2.	"My Fist Your Face"	Steven Tyler, Perry	4:23
3.	"Shame on You"	Tyler	3:22
4.	"The Reason a Dog"	Tyler, Tom Hamilton	4:13
5.	"Shela"	Tyler, Brad Whitford	4:25
6.	"Gypsy Boots"	Tyler, Perry	4:16
7.	"She's on Fire"	Tyler, Perry	3:47
8.	"The Hop"	Tyler, Hamilton, Joey Kramer, Perry, Whitford	3:45
9.	"Darkness"	Tyler	3:43
Total length:			35:42

== Personnel ==
Aerosmith

- Steven Tyler – lead vocals, piano, harmonica
- Joe Perry – guitar, backing vocals
- Brad Whitford – guitar
- Tom Hamilton – bass
- Joey Kramer – drums

Production

- Ted Templeman – producer
- Jeff Hendrickson – engineer, mixing
- Tom Size, Gary Rindfuss, Stan Katayama – assistant engineers
- Howie Weinberg – analog mastering engineer at Masterdisk, New York
- Ken Caillat – digital mastering
- Joan Parker – production coordinator
- Kent Ayeroff – album cover concept
- Norman Moore – art direction and design
- Jim Shea – photography

== Charts ==
Chart (1985)	Peak position
Canada Top Albums/CDs (RPM)	72
Japanese Albums (Oricon)	41
US Billboard 200	36

== Certification ==
Region	Certification	Certified units/sales
United States (RIAA)	Gold	500,000^{^}
^{^} Shipments figures based on certification alone.

== See also ==
- Done with Mirrors Tour

== Bibliography ==
- Huxley, Martin (2015). Aerosmith: The Fall and the Rise of Rock's Greatest Band. St. Martin's Publishing Group. ISBN 978-1250096531.
