= Whiskey Falls =

American country music group

- Origin: Nashville, Tennessee, U.S.
- Genres: Country
- Years active: 2007-2011
- Label: Midas Nashville
- Spinoff of: Seven and the Sun
- Past members: Wally Brandt; Buck Johnson; Damon Johnson; Seven Williams

Whiskey Falls was an American country music group composed of Seven Williams (lead vocals, guitar), Wally Brandt (guitar, vocals) Damon Johnson (guitar, vocals), and Buck Johnson (lead vocals, mandolin, guitar, keyboards). Seven Williams and Wally Brandt were former members of Seven and the Sun, while Damon Johnson was once the frontman of the Southern rock band Brother Cane and a guitarist for Alice Cooper. Whiskey Falls released one self titled album for Midas Records Nashville in 2007 before disbanding.

== Biography ==
The band's lead singer was Seven Williams (born Keith Volpone). Whiskey Falls' other three members, Wally Brandt, Buck Johnson, and Damon Johnson (the latter two are no relation), all sing lead and harmony vocals and play guitar, and Buck Johnson plays keyboard as well. In 2007, Whiskey Falls signed to a recording contract with Midas Records Nashville label. Their self-titled debut album produced two Top 40 singles on the Billboard Hot Country Songs charts in "Last Train Running" (#32) and "Falling Into You" (#40).

In the short time together as a band, Whiskey Falls was named 2008's “Breakout Band of the Year” by Nashville's Music Row, has been featured in People Magazine, USA Weekend, Billboard Magazine and Country Weekly. They have also made appearances on national television including performances on The Early Show, The Jimmy Kimmel Show, Extra!, GAC, and at several NASCAR pre-race events, as well as being featured in television commercials for AAMCO Transmissions.

The group and their song "Load Up the Bases (The Baseball Song)" are featured in promos for Atlanta Braves telecasts on FSN South and SportSouth, as well as for Colorado Rockies telecasts on FSN Rocky Mountain. This song also charted at No. 55 on the country music charts from unsolicited airplay during the 2007 World Series. It was re-released again in 2008 and re-entered at No. 55 on the country charts from unsolicited airplay during the 2008 World Series.

In the summer of 2009, Damon Johnson returned to the Alice Cooper Band and was featured in Cooper's 2010 live concert DVD & CD, "Theatre of Death - Live At Hammersmith". Johnson worked his fifth tour with Alice Cooper in 2011, and departed the band in September of that year to become a full member of Thin Lizzy. Cooper is also credited with assisting greatly in Johnson's beloved golf game, as the two played hundreds of rounds in their years of touring the world together.

In December 2009, Damon returned for a brief stint with Whiskey Falls to join the Toughest Cowboy Tour. The band also penned the theme song for Mark Burnett's show of the same title on Spike (TV channel).

in December 2011, the band got together to record the Christmas single, "Rudolph Guide My Way" for online downloading.

Seven Williams and Wally Brandt have since dedicated their time to their music production company, We3Kings Music writing and producing music for television and film. They have since written the theme songs to NBC's The John Walsh Show, Fox's Tru Calling and The Simple Life and ABC's The Two-Timer, NBC's Minute to Win It, Tabatha's Salon Makeover to Sarah Palin's Alaska, Dance Moms and Ryan & Tatum: The O’Neals. They have also written cues and promos for several TV shows including NBC's Las Vegas, Starting Over, Access Hollywood and Entertainment Tonight. Their major motion picture credits include America's Sweethearts, Summer Catch and Columbia Pictures feature The Quest. and most recently, 20th Century Fox Diary of a Wimpy Kid:Dog Days. In 2013 after a legal battle with Wally Brandt, Seven Williams left We 3 Kings.

== Discography ==
=== Studio albums ===
Title	Album details	Peak chart positions			
Title	Album details	US Country	US	US Indie	US Heat
Whiskey Falls	Release date: September 25, 2007; Label: Midas Records Nashville	25	171	26	6

=== Singles ===
Year	Single	Peak positions	Album
Year	Single	US Country	Album
2007	"Last Train Running"	32	Whiskey Falls
2007	"Falling into You"	40	Whiskey Falls

=== Other charted songs ===
Songs charted from unsolicited airplay from World Series in 2007 and 2008, respectively.

Year	Single	Peak positions	Album
Year	Single	US Country	Album
2007	"Load Up the Bases (The Baseball Song)"	55	Whiskey Falls
2008	"Load Up the Bases (The Baseball Song)" (re-entry)	55	Whiskey Falls

=== Music videos ===
Year	Video	Director
2007	"Last Train Running"	Paul Boyd
