= Once a Rocker, Always a Rocker =

Studio album by The Joe Perry Project
- Released: September 1983
- Recorded: 1983
- Studio: Blue Jay Studios, Carlisle, MA
- Genre: Rock, hard rock
- Length: 38:12
- Label: MCA
- Producer: Joe Perry

The Joe Perry Project chronology
I've Got the Rock'n'Rolls Again (1981)	Once a Rocker, Always a Rocker (1983)	The Music Still Does the Talking: The Best of the Joe Perry Project (1999)

Professional ratings
Review scores
Source	Rating
AllMusic	2/5 stars
Collector's Guide to Heavy Metal	4/10
Metal Forces	9/10

Once a Rocker, Always a Rocker is the third and final album by the Joe Perry Project, released in 1983 on MCA Records.

== Track listing ==
All tracks composed by Joe Perry and Mach Bell; except where indicated.

Side one

1. "Once a Rocker, Always a Rocker" – 2:58
2. "Black Velvet Pants" (Perry) – 3:20
3. "Women in Chains" (Ronnie Brooks, Harold Tipton, Tom DeLuca) – 4:05
4. "Four Guns West" – 4:28
5. "Crossfire" – 5:43

Side two

1. "Adrianna" – 3:20
2. "King of the Kings" – 4:02
3. "Bang a Gong" (Marc Bolan) – 3:55 (T. Rex cover)
4. "Walk with Me Sally" – 3:14
5. "Never Wanna Stop" – 4:27

== Outtakes ==
1. "When Worlds Collide"
2. "First One's for Free"
3. "Going Down"
4. "They'll Never Take Me Alive"
5. "Into the Night"
6. "Something Else"

"When Worlds Collide" and "Going Down" were often included in setlists of The Joe Perry Project prior to the recording sessions of the album, with "Something Else" performed during the tour for the album.

== Alternate song titles ==
1. "No Time for Women" -> "Once a Rocker..."
2. "When Do I Sleep" -> "Adrianna"

== Personnel ==
- Joe Perry – electric and acoustic guitars, lap steel guitar, slide guitar, six-string bass, producer
- "Cowboy" Mach Bell – vocals, percussion
- Danny Hargrove – bass, backing vocals
- Joe Pet – drums, congas, timbales, gong, backing vocals
- Harry King – piano, associate producer
- Mark Parenteau – chains ("Women In Chains")
- Jim Biggins, Rick Cunningham - saxophones

Production

- Michael Golub – engineer, associate producer
- Ed Goodreau, Meg Bryant – tape operators
- Greg Calbi – mastering at Sterling Sound, New York
