= Seven and the Sun =

American rock band

- Seven and the Sun, 2002.

Background information
- Origin: United States
- Genres: Pop rock
- Years active: 2000-2002
- Label: Atlantic
- Past members: Seven; Wally Brandt; Bill Brandt; Eddie Zak

Seven and the Sun was an American rock band consisting of Seven (lead vocals), Wally Brandt (guitar), Bill Brandt (programming), and Eddie Zak (guitars). They are best known for their 2002 single "Walk with Me". Their song was used in the TV soap opera Passions, and was also featured in the Columbia Pictures film, America's Sweethearts starring Julia Roberts, Billy Crystal, John Cusack and Catherine Zeta-Jones. It received moderate air play on American radio, reaching number 38 on the Billboard Adult Top 40, number 27 on the Billboard Mainstream Top 40 and number 40 on the Billboard Top 40 Tracks chart. "Walk with Me" was their only hit.

In September 2003, their song "Back to the Innocence" was chosen to be the theme song for the syndicated talk show The John Walsh Show on NBC that ran from 2002 to 2004.

After they broke up in 2002, Seven and Wally Brandt both formed the country band Whiskey Falls.

== Discography ==
- Album
  - Back to the Innocence - released by Atlantic Records on June 18, 2002
- Singles
  - "Walk with Me" (2002)
