= Campbell American Guitars =

American guitar manufacturing company

- Industry: Musical instruments
- Founded: 2002; 24 years ago
- Headquarters: Massachusetts, United States
- Products: Electric guitars

Campbell American Guitars is an American guitar manufacturing company based in Massachusetts. Their factory was located in Pawtucket Rhode Island. The company originally began in 2002 Greene and Campbell but changed its name to "Campbell American Guitars" in 2005.

Their lines of guitars include the Transitone, Space Biscuit, Caledonian and Precix. As of 2013, all instruments were available through a small group of select dealers on a pre-order basis.

Musicians who play Campbell American guitars include Danny Kortchmar (James Taylor, Carole King, Carly Simon), Tanya Donelly (Throwing Muses, Belly, The Breeders), Luther "Guitar Junior" Johnson, Bill Nelson, Charlie Farren and David "Fuze" Fiuczynski.

== Signature models ==
- Guitarist David "Fuze" Fiuczynski plays his signature 'FuZix' Model.
- Bassist Evan Marien plays his signature five string bass the EM-5.
- Guitarist Bill Nelson plays his signature Campbell American Nelsonic Transitone and a custom space age theme Transitone painted by Nicholas DelDrago called the Spaceship Transitone.
- Guitarist Charlie Farren designed the FMan guitar for Campbell American Guitars. The first production model (serial number 001) was purchased by Massachusetts billionaire Ernie Boch, Jr.
