= Let the Music Do the Talking (song) =

1985 single by Aerosmith

Single by Aerosmith

from the album Done with Mirrors
- B-side: "Gypsy Boots"
- Released: October 1985
- Recorded: 1985
- Genre: Hard rock, heavy metal
- Length: 3:44
- Label: Geffen
- Songwriter: Joe Perry
- Producer: Ted Templeman

Aerosmith singles chronology
| "Lightning Strikes" (1982) | "Let the Music Do the Talking" (1985) | "Shela" (1985) |

Alternative cover

Music video
- "Let the Music Do the Talking" on YouTube

"Let the Music Do the Talking" is a song recorded by the Joe Perry Project in 1980 and later re-recorded by the re-united Aerosmith in 1985. It was written by Joe Perry.

== Overview ==
After guitarist Joe Perry left Aerosmith in 1979, he formed a new band, the Joe Perry Project in which Ralph Morman was the lead singer. The band's first album Let the Music Do the Talking was released in 1980.

In 1984, Perry and Brad Whitford rejoined Aerosmith. Aerosmith recorded the album Done with Mirrors in 1985. Lead singer Steven Tyler and the other band members liked Perry's "Let the Music Do the Talking" and decided to include it on the new album. The song was re-recorded with mostly new lyrics sung by Tyler, and the running time was reduced by about a minute. The song was issued as a single shortly before the album's release, peaking at number 18 on the Mainstream Rock Tracks chart.

== Music video ==
A music video for the Aerosmith version of the song was created in 1985, featuring the band performing live at the Orpheum Theatre in Boston while being filmed illegally by a few teenage fans. The venue's white shirted security guards that appear in the video were actually bouncers recruited earlier in the evening from Boston's now defunct Channel nightclub. The video was directed by Jerry Kramer.

== In concert ==
The song was a live staple for Aerosmith in the 1987-88 tour in support of Permanent Vacation and the band has regularly rotated the song into its setlist since then.

A version of "Let the Music Do the Talking" was also included on the live album Classics Live II, released in 1987.
