= Joe Perry's Merry Christmas =

EP by Joe Perry
- Released: December 2, 2014
- Recorded: 2014
- Genre: Hard rock, Instrumental rock, Blues rock
- Length: 15:49
- Label: Unison Music
- Producer: Joe Perry

Joe Perry chronology
Have Guitar, Will Travel (2009)	Joe Perry's Merry Christmas (2014)	Sweetzerland Manifesto (2018)

Joe Perry's Merry Christmas is an EP by Aerosmith guitarist, Joe Perry, released on December 2, 2014 on Unison Music Group. The album features Johnny Depp playing rhythm guitar on all tracks, and includes four cover songs, which Perry himself prefers to call Holiday songs. This album was released on iTunes and as a regular CD format,

== Background ==
Joe Perry originally wanted to make a Christmas album with Aerosmith, his band, but he was unable to convince them. “I have wanted to do a Christmas CD with Aerosmith for years, but it seems we never have the time to record one,” Perry says in a press release announcing the album. “When my ‘Rocks’ book tour ended, the timing was right — we were in L.A. with access to a studio with some really talented friends and it all fell together. I was finally able to record some Christmas classics for the fans.”. Perry was able to convince Bruce Witkin, and Drummer Dan Potruch, with whom he had been working on material for his next solo album, to take a side trip into some Yuletide fare with him. "I said, 'Why don't we go in and knock off some Christmas songs. We'll do an EP,'" Perry recalls. "He was all up for it, so we got over there and carved out some time. It's all live in the studio. The tracks are all live. That's a real horn section. Those are real girl singers in there. On a lot of my solo records I played everything, but I wanted this to be a real band, so we recorded it like we would've recorded it on tape."

== Track listing ==
No.	Title	Writer(s)	Length
1.	"White Christmas"	Irving Berlin	4:15
2.	"Run Run Rudolph"	Chuck Berry	2:59
3.	"Silent Night"	Franz Xaver Gruber, Joseph Mohr & John F. Young	4:57
4.	"Santa Claus Is Back In Town"	Jerry Leiber & Mike Stoller	3:38
Total length:			15:49
