= Have Guitar, Will Travel (Joe Perry album) =

Studio album by Joe Perry
- Released: October 6, 2009 (US); February 2010 (UK)
- Recorded: The Boneyard, 2009
- Genre: Hard rock
- Length: 47:30
- Label: Roman Records
- Producer: Joe Perry

Joe Perry chronology
Joe Perry (2005)	Have Guitar, Will Travel (2009)	Joe Perry's Merry Christmas (2014)

Have Guitar, Will Travel is the fifth solo album by Aerosmith guitarist Joe Perry, released on October 6, 2009, on Roman Records. In addition to Perry (lead guitar, vocals), the album features German vocalist Hagen Grohe, Joe Perry Project bassist David Hull, pianist Willie Alexander, Hammond organ player Paul Santo, and drummers Marty Richards, Ben Tileston and Scott Meeder. According to Perry, one of the reasons for releasing another solo album is "because you can get out there and do whatever you want and you don't have to answer to anybody." The album's first single was "We've Got a Long Way to Go."

The title is a snowclone of the phrase "Have Gun – Will Travel", and also possibly a reference to the 1960 album of the same name by Bo Diddley.

The album cover was painted by John Douglas and features Joe Perry playing the "Billie" guitar. John Douglas was the one who originally painted Billie Perry on the front and back of the guitar in 2001.

John Douglas stated in an interview with Michael Murphy Gallery "I thought it would be cool for me to paint a portrait of Joe playing that guitar...a portrait of Joe playing the "Billie" guitar painted by the guy that painted the "Billie" guitar."

According to Douglas, when he sent the painting to Perry to autograph for Douglas, "Joe took one look at the painting and said 'That's my album cover!' The Hard Rock now owns the original."

In February 2010, the album received its UK release alongside issue 142 of Classic Rock magazine. Editor Scott Rowley states that: "To our knowledge, it's the first time that a music magazine has given away a complete album." The issue featured an exclusive interview with Aerosmith and a 'track-by-track' interview with Perry about Have Guitar, Will Travel.

== Background and recording ==
For Joe Perry's next solo album, he originally planned to contact notable musicians and record an album featuring 'guest appearances'. Perry states that he considered contacting the likes of Jimmy Page, Slash, Scott Weiland, Robin Zander but ultimately decided not to.

Following aborted plans to record Aerosmith's fifteenth studio album with producer Brendan O'Brien, Perry decided to record another solo album with his newly assembled band which included vocalist Hagen Grohe, bassist David Hull, pianist Willie Alexander, organ player Paul Santo, and drummers Marty Richards, Ben Tileston and Scott Meeder. Perry's wife, Billie Perry, discovered vocalist Hagen Grohe on YouTube after hearing about Journey discovering their vocalist Arnel Pineda in a similar manner. In early 2010, Perry stated that "after Steven blew the friggin' Aerosmith record we got on a bus and headed down south to play Brendan O'Brien the new material and he said, 'Yeah, [Hagen Grohe] has pipes.' So we thought, 'Fuck it, let's put out our own record. We can't count on Tyler anymore, he's a fuckin' burnout.'"

The track "Do You Wonder", was originally written for Aerosmith's thirteenth studio album, Just Push Play, by Perry and frequent producer Marti Frederiksen, but was never finished. Upon showing the track to producer Brendan O'Brien, whilst working on material for Aerosmith's fifteenth studio album, O'Brien is said to have "loved" the track, and pushed for its inclusion on the forthcoming album. However, when the album sessions never came to fruition, Perry decided to include the song on Have Guitar, Will Travel. Perry's wife, Billie, wrote the track's lyrics. Perry stated in a recent interview with Classic Rock: "Fuck it! It's been almost ten years, Brendan thinks it's got potential, I think I'll put it on my record."

== Reception ==
Professional ratings
Review scores
Source	Rating
Allmusic	3.5/5 stars

Allmusic critic Stephen Thomas Erlewine described the album as "the sound of Joe Perry cutting loose in his home studio," and stated that the album "has a warmth that latter-day Aerosmith albums have often lacked."

== Track listing ==
Music and lyrics by Joe Perry unless otherwise noted

1. "We've Got a Long Way to Go" – 4:34
  - The first track to feature synthesizer work by Joe Perry.
2. "Slingshot" – 4:20
3. "Do You Wonder" - 5:14 (Music: Joe Perry, Marti Frederiksen; Lyrics: Billie Perry)
4. "Somebody's Gonna Get (Their Head Kicked in Tonite)" - 4:10 (Jeremy Spencer)
5. "Heaven and Hell" – 7:19
6. "No Surprise" - 4:53
7. "Wooden Ships" – 4:56
  - An instrumental track dedicated to Les Paul.
8. "Oh Lord (21 Grams)" – 3:27
9. "Scare the Cat" – 4:47
10. "Freedom" - 3:50

=== Bonus tracks (Japanese Pressing) ===
1. "Revolution (The Beatles Cover)
2. "Dream On (Reggae Mix)

== Personnel ==
The following people contributed to Have Guitar, Will Travel:

=== Musicians ===
- Joe Perry - guitar, vocals, synth, percussion, programming, sound effects, production
- Hagen Grohe - vocals
- David Hull - bass
- Ben Tileston - drums, percussion, glockenspiel
- Marty Richards - drums
- Scott Meeder - drums
- Russell Powell - guitar
- Willie Alexander - piano
- Paul Santo - Hammond organ, pipe organ, percussion, engineer
- Glen McCarthy - sound effects
- Choir on "Oh Lord" - Brian Greenwood, Vivian Doughty, Kerri McLennan, Charlotte Cipolletti, Kelly McElduff, Mike Bernard, Phil DellaNoce, Dan Creed, Pat Dauwer, Lauren Mack, Roman Perry, Hagen Grohe

=== Recording personnel ===
- Pablo Arraya - recording, engineer, mixing
- Tom Tapley - basic track recording
- Daniel Imana - mixing assistant
- Dave Kutch - mastering

=== Artwork ===
- John Douglas - cover painting
- Stephanie Alexander - The photograph cover is based on
- Billie Perry - photography
- John Bionelli - additional photography
- John Shipp - additional photography
- Ross Halfin - back cover photograph, headstock photo
- Rena DeBortoli - design

== See also ==
- Have Guitar, Will Travel Tour
