= Sweetzerland Manifesto =

Studio album by Joe Perry
- Released: January 19, 2018
- Genres: Hard rock; instrumental rock; blues rock
- Length: 44:06
- Label: Roman Records
- Producers: Joe Perry; Bruce Witkin

Joe Perry chronology
Joe Perry's Merry Christmas (2014)	Sweetzerland Manifesto (2018)	Sweetzerland Manifesto MKII (2023)

Singles from Sweetzerland Manifesto
- 1. "Aye, Aye, Aye" Released: December 8, 2017

Sweetzerland Manifesto is the fourth solo album by Aerosmith guitarist Joe Perry, released on January 19, 2018 on Roman Records.

== Track listing ==
No.	Title	Writer(s)	Lead vocals	Length
1.	"Rumble in the Jungle"	Joe Perry	instrumental	3:51
2.	"I'll Do Happiness"	Perry; Reid; Jack Douglas	Terry Reid	3:39
3.	"Aye, Aye, Aye"	Perry, Zander	Robin Zander	4:15
4.	"I Wanna Roll"	Perry, Johansen	David Johansen	4:51
5.	"Sick & Tired"	Perry, Reid, Douglas	Reid	4:54
6.	"Haberdasher Blues"	Perry, Johansen	Johansen	5:31
7.	"Spanish Sushi"	J. Perry, Anthony Perry, Roman Perry	instrumental	3:33
8.	"Eve of Destruction"	P. F. Sloan	Joe Perry	4:19
9.	"I'm Going Crazy"	Perry, Johansen	David Johansen	3:58
10.	"Won't Let Me Go"	Perry, Reid, Douglas	Reid	5:15
Total length:				44:06
