= David Hull (musician) =

American bass guitar player

David Hull is an American bass guitar player, best known as the substitute bass player for Aerosmith during three of their world tours.

== Biography ==
David Hull began his career in music performing with Buddy Miles, Joe Cocker, Ted Nugent, Arthur Lee & Lee's band (called "Band-Aid" on the Lee solo album Vindicator.

In the 1970s, he was a member of the Connecticut band White Chocolate. Later, Hull founded the rock band The Dirty Angels and was a songwriter, bassist and co-producer on the band's three albums.

On October 1, 1970, Hull performed at an impromptu show after the funeral of Jimi Hendrix. Hull joined Buddy Miles, Johnny Winter, Charlie Karp, Billy Cox, Mitch Mitchell and Noel Redding at a nearby hall.

Since Hull's personal connection to members of Aerosmith date back to the late 1970s, Hull was asked to be the studio and touring bassist and background vocalist for the first two albums of The Joe Perry Project, a band formed by Aerosmith guitarist Joe Perry. Several songs on the band's first two albums were co-written by Hull.

In 1986, he changed his name to David Heit and formed a rock trio with fellow Joe Perry Project member Charlie Farren, naming the band Farrenheit (also written as Farren/Heit). The band signed with Warner Bros. Records and their music went into regular rotation on MTV. They scored an opening slot on Boston's 70-stop sold-out American tour. Farrenheit's eponymous album spent seven weeks on the Billboard 200.

After Farrenheit, Hull was involved with several bands including rock bands Modern Farmer (with Reeves Gabrels) and Pete Droge And The Sinners, in addition to blues band Kat in the Hat and with Monster Mike Welch.

In 2006, Hull filled in on Aerosmith's Route of All Evil Tour for regular bassist Tom Hamilton who was absent while recovering from throat cancer.

In 2009, after filling in for Hamilton again on another of Aerosmith's international tours, Hull reunited with The Joe Perry Project on the band's album Have Guitar, Will Travel. The re-formed band toured the United States in 2009 and 2010. In January 2010, they joined with Mötley Crüe on their tour of Canada. In April they joined Bad Company for a tour of the United Kingdom, during which they performed shows at Wembley Arena and the 100 Club.

In September 2010, Hull released a solo CD Soul In Motion, on which he performed guitar, bass and lead vocals. The album was produced by Brynn Arens, former leader of Minneapolis band Flipp. Guest musicians included Joe Perry, contributing lead guitar on the title song, and Charlie Farren on background vocals.

In January 2013, Hull was involved in the album From Detroit to the Delta by the James Montgomery Band. He played bass, co-wrote three songs, produced, engineered and sang backing vocals.

In April 2013, Hull was asked for a third time to fill in for Hamilton on Aerosmith's tour.

He appeared in the 2019 documentary film WBCN and the American Revolution.
