= Whiskey Falls (album) =

Studio album by Whiskey Falls
- Released: September 25, 2007
- Studio: Beachfront Studio (Franklin, Tennessee); Emerald Studios (Nashville, Tennessee); We3Kings Studios (Los Angeles, California)
- Genre: Country
- Length: 52:45
- Label: Midas
- Producer: Whiskey Falls

Professional ratings
Review scores
Source	Rating
AllMusic	4/5 stars

Whiskey Falls is the only studio album by American country music group Whiskey Falls. It was released on September 25, 2007, on Midas Records. The album includes the singles "Last Train Running" and "Falling into You", which reached #32 and #40 respectively on the Billboard Hot Country Songs charts. "The Baseball Song" also peaked at #55 based on unsolicited airplay shortly before the release of "Falling into You". The album debuted at #171 on the US Billboard 200, and at #25 on the US Top Country Albums.

In 2010, Damon Johnson recorded his own version of "Better Days Will Come at Last" for his album Release. This version was a duet featuring Johnson and his daughter, Sarah Marlo Johnson.

== Track listing ==
No.	Title	Writer(s)	Length
1.	"Falling into You"	Bill Brandt, Walter Brandt, Seven Williams, Cliff Downs	3:39
2.	"Last Train Running"	B. Brandt, W. Brandt, Frank J. Myers, Williams	3:59
3.	"The Night Ain't Over Yet"	Bryan Simpson, Wade Kirby, Ashley Gorley	3:14
4.	"Highway 59"	B. Brandt, W. Brandt, Buck Johnson, Williams, Downs	4:46
5.	"The Champ"	B. Brandt, W. Brandt, Myers, Williams	4:13
6.	"Days of Birmingham"	Buck Johnson, Charlie Midnight	3:40
7.	"Better Days Will Come at Last"	Damon Johnson	3:27
8.	"Working Man"	B. Brandt, W. Brandt, B. Johnson, Williams, Jeremy Stover	3:24
9.	"So Much Better"	B. Brandt, W. Brandt, B. Johnson, Williams, Downs	3:48
10.	"Keep the Light On"	B. Brandt, W. Brandt, Williams	4:17
11.	"I Can't Stop Loving You"	B. Brandt, W. Brandt, Williams, Downs	4:32
12.	"Let the Whiskey Fall"	B. Brandt, W. Brandt, B. Johnson, D. Johnson, Williams	3:36
13.	"Load Up the Bases (The Baseball Song)" ([CD-Rom Track])	B. Brandt, W. Brandt, Williams	6:10

== Charts ==
Year	Chart	Peak position
2007	Billboard Top Country Albums	25
2007	US Billboard 200	171
2007	Billboard Top Heatseekers	6
2007	Billboard Top Independent Albums	26
