= Charlie Karp =

American musician and documentarian (1953–2019)

- Born: April 13, 1953
- Died: March 10, 2019 (aged 65)
- Instrument: Guitar

Charles Karp (April 13, 1953 – March 10, 2019) was an American musician and Emmy Award-winning documentarian. A former student at Coleytown Middle School and Staples High School, both in Westport, Connecticut, he left school as a senior to pursue music. Karp had a professional career that stretched nearly 50 years. He won an Emmy producing music for films and television, and his biography credits him as working on jingles for such products as Twix candy bars, US Tobacco and Xerox. He died at age 65.
