= The Joe Perry Project =

American rock band

- Origin: United States
- Genres: Hard rock, blues rock
- Years active: 1979–1984; 2009–2010; 2022–present
- Labels: Roman, Columbia, MCA
- Members: Joe Perry; Brad Whitford; Buck Johnson; Jason Sutter; Chris Robinson; Robert DeLeo
- Past members: Ronnie Stewart; Joe Pet; Ralph Morman; Joey Mala; Charlie Farren; Cowboy Mach Bell; Danny Hargrove; David Hull; Hagen Grohe; Paul Santo; Marty Richards; Chris Wyse; Gary Cherone; David Hull; Eric Kretz
- Website: joeperrymusic.com

The Joe Perry Project is an American rock band formed by Aerosmith lead guitarist Joe Perry shortly before his departure from Aerosmith in 1979. They almost immediately signed a record deal with Aerosmith's label, Columbia Records, who were disappointed with the chaos in the Aerosmith camp and hoping to maneuver Perry back into Aerosmith. The Project, with its debut album, Let the Music Do the Talking, played in smaller venues mostly around the Boston area. After several line-up changes over the next few years and two more albums with dismal sales the band dissolved in 1984 when Perry, and guitarist Brad Whitford, agreed to reunite with Aerosmith, bringing the band back to its original line-up. Joe Perry has reformed the Joe Perry Project several times since as a side project to stay busy during downtime with Aerosmith.

== History ==
The original band line-up consisted of Joe Perry on guitar and sometimes lead vocal, Ralph Morman, on lead vocals, bassist David Hull, and drummer Ronnie Stewart. This line-up recorded the band's 1980 debut album, Let the Music Do the Talking, which was produced by long-time Aerosmith producer Jack Douglas. The album was well-received and sold 250,000 copies in America within its first six months of release.

In June 1980, while on tour in support of the album, Ralph Morman was fired from the band due to issues with alcohol and his undependable and unpredictable behavior. He was temporarily replaced by singer Joey Mala, of the New York-based act Revolver, in order for Perry to fulfill concert obligations until a permanent vocalist could be brought in. A permanent replacement was eventually found in singer and rhythm guitarist Charlie Farren. Perry, Farren, Stewart, and Hull recorded one album, I've Got the Rock'n'Rolls Again, which proved to be less successful than the group's debut effort. Columbia Records executives were reluctant to promote the album, which some believe was due solely on the fact that they were much more interested in a reunited Aerosmith, than a Perry solo project. This resistance from the label, combined with Perry's ongoing drug and financial problems, led to the entire band quitting in 1982.

Equipped with a new record label (MCA Records) and three new band members in singer Cowboy Mach Bell, bassist Danny Hargrove and drummer Joe Pet, the band released Once a Rocker, Always a Rocker in 1983. The album met the same fate as its predecessor, selling less than 50,000 copies. Despite the poor sales, The Project went out on a final tour in support of the album, adding then-former Aerosmith guitarist Brad Whitford to the line-up.

A compilation album, The Music Still Does the Talking: The Best of the Joe Perry Project, was released by an Australian Indie Record label in 1999.

=== Reformation ===
On October 6, 2009, Joe Perry, on his own record label (Roman Records) released a solo album titled Have Guitar, Will Travel. The first single was called "We've Got a Long Way to Go." Although the record was released as a Perry solo album, the touring band included original bassist David Hull and was billed as The Joe Perry Project. Also participating were guitarist/keyboardist Paul Santo (Aerosmith, Ozzy Osbourne, Ringo Starr), drummer Marty Richards ( James Montgomery, Norah Jones, The J. Geils Band) and German vocalist Hagen Grohe who was discovered by Billie Perry (Joe Perry's wife) on YouTube. The new Joe Perry Project also backed Joe on his latest album, making it a de facto JPP album.

On September 20, 2009, the new Joe Perry Project played the first public concert of the Have Guitar, Will Travel Tour at Memorial Hall in Plymouth, Massachusetts. The show was announced just days before the event. Fans who attended were the first to hear some of the new songs from the upcoming album, as well as a handful of classic Aerosmith songs including: "Let the Music Do the Talking" (original JPP version), "Walkin' The Dog," "Dream On," "Combination" and "Walk This Way." The final song of the night was a cover of Neil Young's "Rockin' in the Free World."

During the 2009–2010 tour, the Joe Perry Project opened for Bad Company and Mötley Crüe.

In 2022, Joe Perry announced that the Joe Perry Project would be playing three shows in New England that summer. The lineup for these shows includes Buck Johnson, Pet, Chris Wyse, and Gary Cherone of Extreme. Additionally the band scheduled two shows in Brazil that same summer. The next year, Perry announced another tour. The lineup for the 2023 tour includes Cherone, Johnson, Hull, and Jason Sutter, who toured with the band the prior year in place of Pet.

In May 2025, following the touring retirement of Aerosmith, Perry announced a new lineup consisting of Johnson, Brad Whitford (guitar), singer Chris Robinson (The Black Crowes), bassist Robert DeLeo and drummer Eric Kretz (both of Stone Temple Pilots). In August, shortly before the beginning of the tour, Perry announced that Kretz would be unable to tour and that Sutter would return to the group.

== Band members ==
Current members

- Joe Perry – lead guitar, vocals (1979–1984, 2009–present)
- Brad Whitford – rhythm guitar (1982, 2025–present)
- Buck Johnson – keyboards, vocals (2022–present)
- Jason Sutter – drums (2023, 2025–present)
- Chris Robinson – lead vocals (2025–present)
- Robert DeLeo – bass (2025–present)

Former members

- Ronnie Stewart – drums (1979–1983)
- Ralph Morman – vocals (1979–1980)
- David Hull – bass, vocals (1979–1982, 2009–2010, 2023)
- Joey Mala – vocals (1980)
- Charlie Farren – vocals, rhythm guitar (1980–1982)
- Cowboy Mach Bell – vocals (1982–1984)
- Danny Hargrove – bass (1982–1984)
- Joe Pet – drums (1983–1984, 2022)
- Joey Kramer – drums (1984)
- Hagen Grohe – vocals (2009–2010)
- Paul Santo – rhythm guitar, keyboards (2009–2010)
- Marty Richards – drums (2009–2010)
- Chris Wyse – bass (2022)
- Gary Cherone – vocals (2022–2023)
- Eric Kretz – drums (2025)

== Discography ==
=== Studio albums ===
- Let the Music Do the Talking (1980)
- I've Got the Rock & Rolls Again (1981)
- Once a Rocker, Always a Rocker (1983)

=== Singles ===
- "Let the Music Do the Talking" (1980)
- "Buzz Buzz" (1981)

=== Compilation albums ===
- The Music Still Does the Talking: The Best of the Joe Perry Project (1999)

== See also ==
- Joe Perry (debut solo album)
