= Joe Perry (musician) =

American guitarist (born 1950)

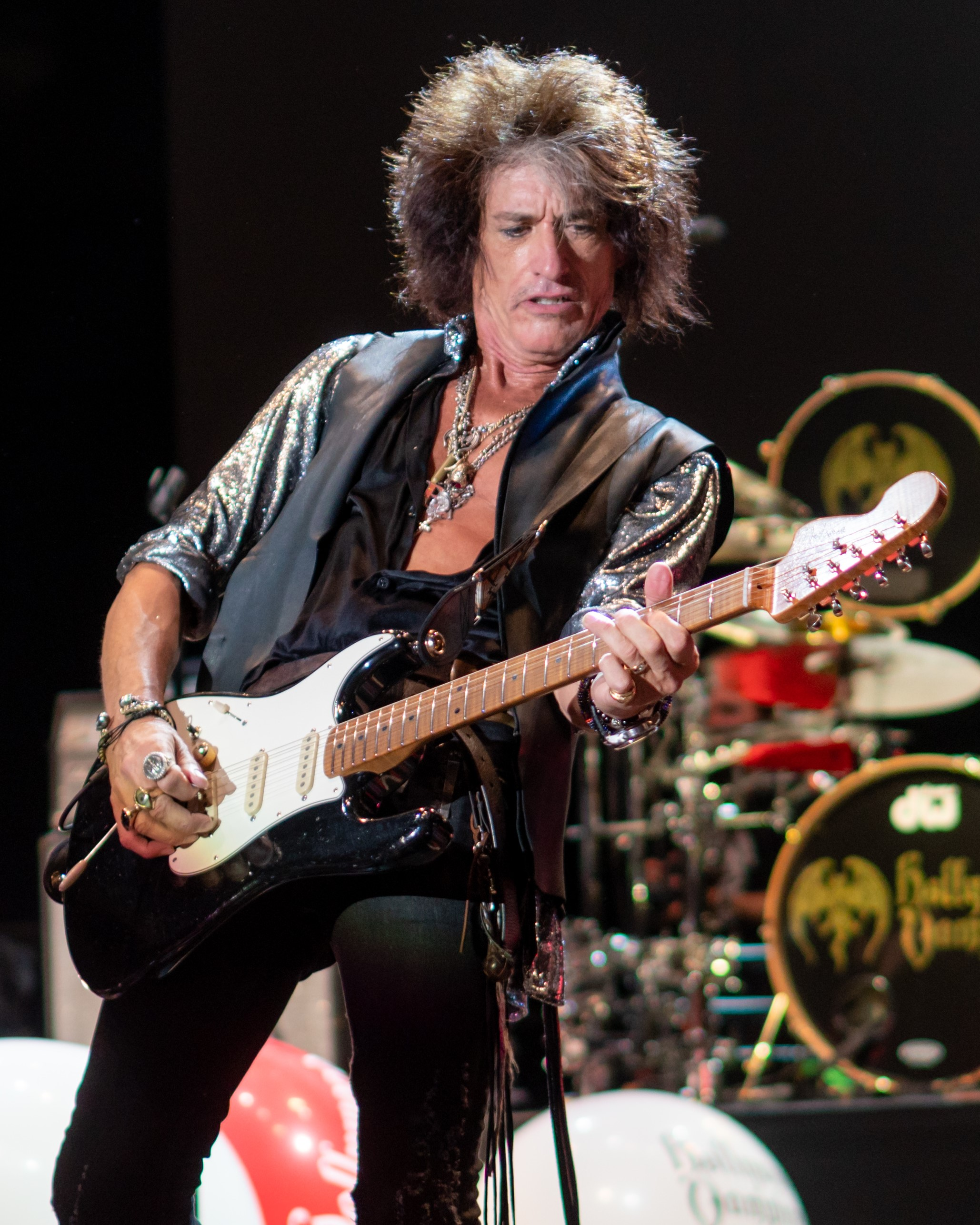
- Perry performing with Hollywood Vampires in 2018

Background information
- Born: Joseph Anthony Pereira; September 10, 1950 (age 76); Lawrence, Massachusetts, U.S.
- Genres: Hard rock; blues rock; rock and roll; heavy metal
- Occupations: Musician; songwriter
- Instruments: Guitar; vocals
- Years active: 1965–present
- Member of: Aerosmith; The Joe Perry Project; Hollywood Vampires
- Website: joeperry.com

Joseph Anthony Pereira (born September 10, 1950), professionally known as Joe Perry, is an American musician best known as a founding member, guitarist, backing and occasional lead vocalist of the rock band Aerosmith and has appeared on every studio album except Rock in a Hard Place. Perry also has his own solo band called the Joe Perry Project, and is a member of the all-star band Hollywood Vampires with Alice Cooper and Johnny Depp.

He was ranked 84th in Rolling Stone's list of The 100 Greatest Guitarists of All Time and in 2001, was inducted into the Rock and Roll Hall of Fame as part of Aerosmith. In 2013, Perry and his songwriting partner Steven Tyler were recipients of the ASCAP Founders Award and were also inducted into the Songwriters Hall of Fame. In October 2014, Simon & Schuster released Rocks: My Life In and Out of Aerosmith, written by Perry with David Ritz.

== Early life ==
Joseph Anthony Pereira was born in Lawrence, Massachusetts on September 10, 1950. He was raised in the central Massachusetts town of Hopedale, which is about an hour south of the City of Lawrence. His father was an accountant of Portuguese descent from Madeira, and his mother was a high school gym teacher of an Italian descent.

At a very young age, Pereira found himself drawn to the ocean. His dream was to one day become a marine biologist and follow in the tracks of his influence, Jacques Cousteau. His grades at Hopedale Junior Senior High School were not good, and his chances of eventually going to college were fading. At one point, his parents even tried enticing him with a promise that if he worked to get his grades up, he might be able to intern for a summer at the Woods Hole Oceanographic Institution on Cape Cod. Still, Pereira's grades showed no signs of improving, and in his junior year, his parents made the decision to withdraw him from Hopedale and enroll him at an all-boys preparatory school, Vermont Academy. The boarding school, which housed around 200 young men, was located in Saxtons River, a small town in southern Vermont. The teenaged Pereira was not pleased about this plan. It was his parents' hope that, with their son actually living at the school and being embedded in such an educational environment, he would be able to focus more on learning and improving his grades to an acceptable college entry level.

Many years later, in his memoir, Rocks: My Life In and Out of Aerosmith, Pereira wrote about his self-professed learning difficulties during his school years and how it was actually the result of his having ADHD, a condition that had remained undiagnosed until recently. He spoke about it while discussing the book in a 2014 interview with J.C. Macek for PopMatters: "It was looked at as a discipline problem when I was in school. And certainly, over the years, after I left school, I had forged my way into this thing called rock 'n' roll and it was less of an issue." However, Pereira considered the possibility that the learning disability was something of a double-edged sword for his career: "I'm starting to realize that in some ways it's helped my guitar playing and it's hurt my guitar playing in the way that I kind of learned certain things and my ability to retain certain things."

The time Pereira spent at Vermont Academy was vastly different from what his parents had envisioned for him, and it turned out to be an experience that would forever alter the trajectory of his life. Living there was nothing like what Pereira had been accustomed to, coming from such a sheltered small town like Hopedale. The students who attended this prep school were from all over the world. Many of them lived in major metropolitan cities like Los Angeles and New York, and unlike Pereira, they had been living right in the middle of the "sex, drugs, and rock 'n roll" culture of the late 1960s: "After vacations, guys would come back with bits and pieces of different cultures", Perry was quoted as saying in an interview with the Burlington Free Press. "It was a real education for me and not the kind of learning they (his parents) sent me there for."

His classmates introduced him to a whole new topic, and he soon started discovering things like The Village Voice, the first underground newspaper to extensively cover American culture. However, it was his exposure to this new music that would be the heaviest influence on him. It was so different from anything he had ever heard before. Pereira had actually taken up the guitar at the age of ten, and even though he is left-handed, he learned to play with his right hand. He said in 2014 that a substantial early influence on his music was The Beatles: "The night The Beatles first played The Ed Sullivan Show, boy, that was something. Seeing them on TV was akin to a national holiday. Talk about an event. I never saw guys looking so cool. I had already heard some of their songs on the radio, but I wasn't prepared by how powerful and totally mesmerizing they were to watch. It changed me completely. I knew something was different in the world that night." After hearing the music his classmates were listening to, he found himself becoming even more obsessed with his playing. He would sit in his room for hours, lifting the needle off a record that was playing. He then would try to drop it back down in the same spot, so it would be perfectly in sync with the riff he was playing on his own guitar.

Vermont Academy was where he heard Jimi Hendrix for the first time. It was also where he first heard British rock bands like The Who, The Kinks, and The Yardbirds – the band responsible for one of Aerosmith's first and most iconic covers, "Train Kept a Rollin". It was where Pereira went from dreaming about being a marine biologist to dreaming about being in a band like The Yardbirds. Perry said: "This band called the Yardbirds had a sound like I had never heard before, they had guitars that sound like nothing I'd ever heard before. The Stones were pushing the edge with distorted guitars. That was a big influence on me."

== Career ==
=== Formation and initial success of Aerosmith (1968–1979) ===
During the late 1960s, Pereira adopted the stage name Joe Perry and formed The Jam Band with Tom Hamilton. Steven Tyler, Brad Whitford and Joey Kramer eventually joined them, and the band was renamed Aerosmith. While initially dismissed as Rolling Stones knock-offs, the band came into its own during the mid-1970s, with a string of hit records. Chief among these successes were their first hit single, "Dream On", and early albums such as Toys in the Attic (1975) and Rocks (1976), thanks largely to the prevalence of free-form, album-oriented FM radio. The group also managed hit singles on the radio, with songs like "Same Old Song and Dance", "Sweet Emotion", "Walk This Way", "Back in the Saddle", and "Last Child".

During this time, Perry and Tyler became known as the "Toxic Twins" for their notorious hard-partying and drug use. Aerosmith's crowd earned the nickname "The Blue Army", so called by the band after the seemingly endless number of teenagers in the audience wearing blue denim jackets and blue jeans. The audience was abundantly male with long hair.

Following the release of Aerosmith's fourth studio album, Rocks, the group began to stumble. Drug use escalated and the creative process became hampered by strained relationships within the band. This was highlighted during the development process for their next album, which was recorded at an abandoned convent in upstate New York. During their time there, Tyler and Perry would spend much of the time in their rooms getting high, away from the rest of the band, and would often record their parts separately. The band, hampered by rampant drug use and distracted by hobbies such as driving fast cars on the nearby parkways and shooting high-powered firearms in the building's attic, struggled to come up with ideas. Draw the Line, released in 1977, became a hit nonetheless, going double Platinum. However, it was not as successful as their prior efforts, with the singles "Draw the Line" and "Kings and Queens" both charting in the Hot 100, but failing to crack the Top 40. On the album, Perry sang lead vocals on the track "Bright Light Fright". The band toured throughout 1977 and 1978 in support of the album, but increasing violence at concerts (such as bottles, cherry bombs, M-80s, and firecrackers being thrown on-stage, including several notorious incidents at the Spectrum in Philadelphia) as well as the band's heavy drug use began to affect the performances. In 1978, Aerosmith released the live collection Live! Bootleg, released the stand-alone single "Chip Away the Stone", and starred as "The Future Villain Band" in the film Sgt. Pepper's Lonely Hearts Club Band. For the film, the band released a cover of the Beatles' "Come Together", which would become the band's last Top 40 hit for nearly a decade.

=== Decline of Aerosmith and formation of Joe Perry Project (1979–1984) ===
In 1979, Aerosmith headlined over Van Halen, Ted Nugent, AC/DC and Foreigner during the world music festival concerts. However, as the decade was about to conclude, the band's drug use began taking its toll, and tensions were slowly coming to a head. On July 28, 1979, at the World Series of Rock in Cleveland, an argument resulted in Perry's wife throwing a glass of milk at Tom Hamilton's wife. Perry and Tyler had a heated argument, which led to Perry leaving Aerosmith part-way through the development of the album Night in the Ruts, with the remainder of his parts played by temporary guitarists. Perry took a collection of unrecorded material with him, which would later become the basis of his album Let the Music Do the Talking, released in 1980. The album featured vocalist Ralph Morman, bassist David Hull and drummer Ronnie Stewart and went on to sell 250,000 copies. Midway through the tour in support of the album, Ralph Morman was succeeded by Joey Mala for the remainder of the tour. It was followed by I've Got the Rock'n'Rolls Again in 1981, which featured vocalist/rhythm guitarist Charlie Farren, a veteran of the Boston rock scene. After this tour, there was a major shakeup of the band: Charlie Farren, David Hull and Ronnie Stewart left the band and the Joe Perry Project was dropped from Columbia Records. Equipped with a new record label (MCA Records) and three new band members in singer Mach Bell, bassist Danny Hargrove and drummer Joe Pet, the Joe Perry Project released the follow-up and Once a Rocker, Always a Rocker (1983). These albums did not fare as well as The Project's debut, selling only 40,000 copies apiece. Despite the poor sales, The Project went out on a final tour in support of the album, adding former Aerosmith guitarist Brad Whitford to the lineup. During this tour, The Project performed in a series of co-bills with Huey Lewis and the News.

=== Reunion of Aerosmith and return to the spotlight (1984–1999) ===
In February 1984, both Perry and Whitford met up with their old bandmates in Aerosmith, which led to their rejoining the band two months later. Aerosmith signed a new record deal with Geffen Records (which coincidentally was sold to MCA in 1990, absorbing the MCA label 13 years later). When Perry rejoined Aerosmith, he brought on his manager Tim Collins to manage the band. Collins would help orchestrate much of Aerosmith's success over the next decade.

In 1984, Aerosmith embarked on a successful comeback tour, the "Back in the Saddle Tour". The following year, the band released their first album since re-uniting, Done with Mirrors, which was received favorably by critics but did not fare as well commercially, only going gold and failing to generate a hit single, aside from the rock radio cut "Let the Music Do the Talking", a remake of Perry's 1980 solo song. In 1986, Perry and Tyler collaborated with Run-D.M.C. in a remake of Aerosmith's 1975 hit "Walk This Way", which helped break rap into mainstream popularity and brought Aerosmith renewed mainstream attention as well. Despite their success since re-forming, drug problems still stood in their way. After completing drug rehabilitation, Aerosmith went on to collaborate with various big-name songwriters (such as Desmond Child and Jim Vallance), producers (Bruce Fairbairn), A&R men (John Kalodner), and music video directors (Marty Callner and David Fincher) to launch their true comeback, with the successful multi-platinum albums Permanent Vacation (1987), Pump (1989), and Get a Grip (1993), which were backed by many hit singles ("Dude (Looks Like a Lady)", "Angel", "Rag Doll", "Love in an Elevator", "Janie's Got a Gun", "What it Takes", "The Other Side", "Livin' on the Edge", "Cryin'", "Amazing", and "Crazy"), popular music videos, and worldwide concert tours. The band won several awards throughout the 1990s, including four Grammy Awards and ten MTV Video Music Awards. Perry and Tyler resumed their friendship, again co-writing songs and performing very close together on stage, as well as vacationing together with their families after the conclusion of the Get a Grip Tour. However, tensions with the band hit its stride again in 1996, while the band was in the midst of recording their next album. While songwriting and recording sessions in Miami had begun well, the band's manager began pressuring the band members, spreading false information to the band members, and keeping the band members separate from one another, almost causing Aerosmith to disband. While grateful for all he had done to help resurrect their careers, Aerosmith fired Collins in 1996, and carried on with new management. The double-platinum-certified album, Nine Lives, was finally released in 1997. Nine Lives was fueled by the hit singles "Falling in Love (Is Hard on the Knees)" and "Pink" and supported by the three-year-long Nine Lives Tour. During this time, Perry starred in a commercial for The Gap with Steven Tyler. The band also released their bestselling tell-all book Walk This Way: The Autobiography of Aerosmith. In 1998, Perry helped conceive the group's first number one single, "I Don't Want to Miss a Thing", with pop songwriter Diane Warren. It appeared on the soundtrack to the film Armageddon, in which Tyler's daughter Liv starred. In 1999, the Rock 'n' Roller Coaster Starring Aerosmith opened at Walt Disney World in Orlando, Florida. On September 9, 1999, Perry and Tyler reunited with Run-D.M.C. and were also joined by Kid Rock for a collaborative live performance of "Walk This Way" at the MTV Video Music Awards.

=== Continued success of Aerosmith and solo albums (2000–present) ===
In 2001, Aerosmith performed at the Super Bowl XXXV half-time show and released the platinum-certified album, Just Push Play, which included the Top 10 single "Jaded". Shortly after the album's release, Perry was inducted to the Rock and Roll Hall of Fame as part of Aerosmith. The band subsequently went on the eight-month-long Just Push Play Tour and went on to tour every following year, with the exception of 2008. The Aerosmith blues cover album Honkin' on Bobo was released in 2004. Perry released his first solo record, the self-titled Joe Perry, in May 2005. It was recorded at his home studio (The Boneyard) in suburban Boston, with every instrument but the drums played by Perry himself. Critics also responded favorably; Rolling Stone magazine crowned it with three-and-a-half (out of five) stars, declaring "A Joe Perry solo joint? about time!" He was also nominated for "Best Rock Instrumental" at the 2006 Grammys for the track "Mercy" but lost to Les Paul. In 2006, Perry performed alongside Steven Tyler for a three-song medley ("Dream On", "Walk This Way", "I Don't Want to Miss a Thing") with the Boston Pops Orchestra as part of a nationally televised event to celebrate the Fourth of July in Boston, Massachusetts.

Guitar Hero: Aerosmith, a video game featuring the band's songs, was released in 2008. In 2009, while on tour with Aerosmith, Perry announced that he would be releasing a new Joe Perry Project album entitled Have Guitar, Will Travel, which was released on October 6, 2009. The first single from the album was "We've Got a Long Way to Go". This marks the first Joe Perry Project album since 1983's Once a Rocker, Always a Rocker, and the fifth Joe Perry solo album in total, counting the 2005 self-titled album. He toured Europe and the States in late 2009 and early 2010 in support of the album. After Tyler fell off a stage during an Aerosmith show in August 2009 in Sturgis, South Dakota, during the band's Guitar Hero: Aerosmith Tour (causing the rest of the ill-fated tour to be canceled), tensions flared between Tyler and his bandmates, especially Perry, and it got to the point where the band members were not speaking to each other. Media reports began to circulate that Tyler had left the band and that Perry and the other members of Aerosmith were searching for a new singer to replace Tyler. On November 10, 2009, at a Joe Perry Project concert in New York City, Tyler made a surprise appearance, assuring the crowd he was not quitting Aerosmith and performed "Walk This Way" with the band. After Tyler completed drug rehabilitation in early 2010, he got back together with his bandmates and they announced a world tour called the Cocked, Locked, Ready to Rock Tour, which took place in the spring and summer of 2010. While on tour, several on-stage incidents (including Tyler accidentally hitting Perry in the head with his mic stand and Perry bumping Tyler off the stage) as well as Tyler signing on to be a judge on American Idol without telling his bandmates caused tensions to again flare between Tyler and Perry, but subsided once again by the time the tour ended.

Perry performing with Aerosmith in Chicago, Illinois, on June 22, 2012

Aerosmith then proceeded to spend much of the summer of 2011 recording their next album, their first of predominantly original material in a decade. Like Honkin' on Bobo, their next album was produced by a team that included Perry, Tyler, Jack Douglas, and Marti Frederiksen. The band toured Japan and South America in late 2011 and continued recording in early 2012. In May 2012, their new single "Legendary Child" was released and performed live on the season finale of American Idol. It was also announced that the band's new album would be titled Music from Another Dimension! and would be released in August 2012; the album's release date would later be pushed back to November 2012. Two more singles ("What Could Have Been Love and "Lover Alot") were released in advance of the album. The band supported the album with the Global Warming Tour, which lasted for much of summer and fall of 2012 and appearances on national television programs. In January 2013, the single "Can't Stop Lovin' You" (a duet with country star Carrie Underwood) was released, and in February, it was announced that Perry and his songwriting partner Steven Tyler would be recipients of the ASCAP Founders Award at the society's 30th Annual Pop Music Awards on April 17 and that the duo would be inducted into the Songwriters Hall of Fame at a ceremony to be held on June 13.

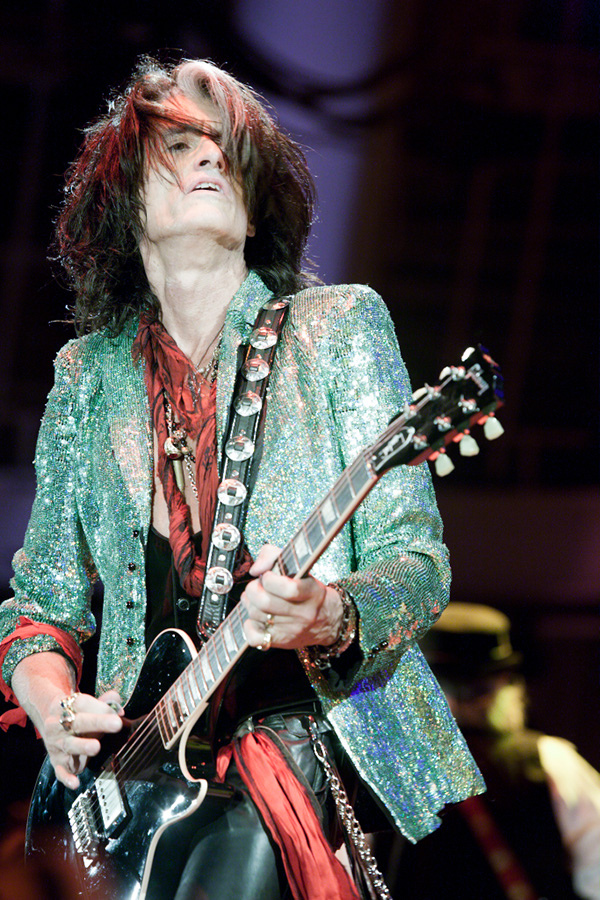
Perry performing with Aerosmith in April 2013

In late April and early May 2013, Aerosmith extended their Global Warming Tour to Australia, New Zealand, the Philippines, and Indonesia. This marked the band's first performances in Australia in 23 years, and the band's first-ever performances in the latter three countries. On May 30, Aerosmith performed as part of the "Boston Strong" charity concert for victims of the Boston Marathon bombing. The band also performed at a handful of shows in the U.S. and Japan in July and August. In the fall of 2013, Aerosmith extended their tour to Central and South America, including their first-ever performances in Guatemala, El Salvador and Uruguay.

From May 17 to June 28, 2014, Perry performed 15 shows with Aerosmith on the European leg of the Global Warming Tour. This was followed by the Let Rock Rule Tour (featuring Slash with Myles Kennedy & the Conspirators as the opening act), which sent Aerosmith to 19 locations across North America from July 10 to September 12.

On October 7, 2014, Perry released his autobiography Rocks: My Life in and Out of Aerosmith, co-written by David Ritz. Perry promoted the book with a book-signing tour that took him to 14 locations across the United States in the month of October.

Perry playing his "Billie" guitar (featuring an image of his wife Billie) while performing with Aerosmith in Grand Rapids, Michigan, on August 4, 2015

On June 13, 2015, Perry embarked on the Blue Army Tour with Aerosmith, which sent the band to 17 North American locations through August 7, many of them in smaller venues in secondary markets that the band has either never performed in or has not performed in many years. On the tour, the band performed several lesser-known deep cuts. Also in 2015, Perry was one of the narrators for the documentary film Unity.

Since 2015, Perry has worked with Alice Cooper and Johnny Depp on the side project Hollywood Vampires, which released their eponymous debut album in September 2015 and performed at the 58th Grammy Awards on February 15, 2016. In the summer of 2016, the Vampires launched a summer concert tour of North America, joined by drummer Matt Sorum and bassist Robert DeLeo.

On July 10, 2016, Perry collapsed onstage at a concert he was performing with the Hollywood Vampires on Coney Island in Brooklyn, New York. It was believed that Perry had suffered cardiac arrest. He was rushed to the hospital, where he was declared to be in stable condition later that night. The Vampires continued the show without Perry that evening, and continued the rest of their tour, but canceled an appearance on The Late Show with Stephen Colbert. After resting for a few days, Perry made a full recovery and returned to the Hollywood Vampires tour.

In September and October, Perry rejoined Aerosmith for a festival performance in San Diego and a nine-date tour of Latin America, called the Rock 'N' Roll Rumble Tour. In November 2016, Aerosmith announced that they would be going on a "farewell" tour in Europe in the spring and summer of 2017, titled the Aero-Vederci Baby! tour. According to Perry and bandmate Brad Whitford, the tour will likely last several years and the band is also considering recording another album. After the European leg of the tour concluded in July 2017, the band performed in South America in September and October 2017.

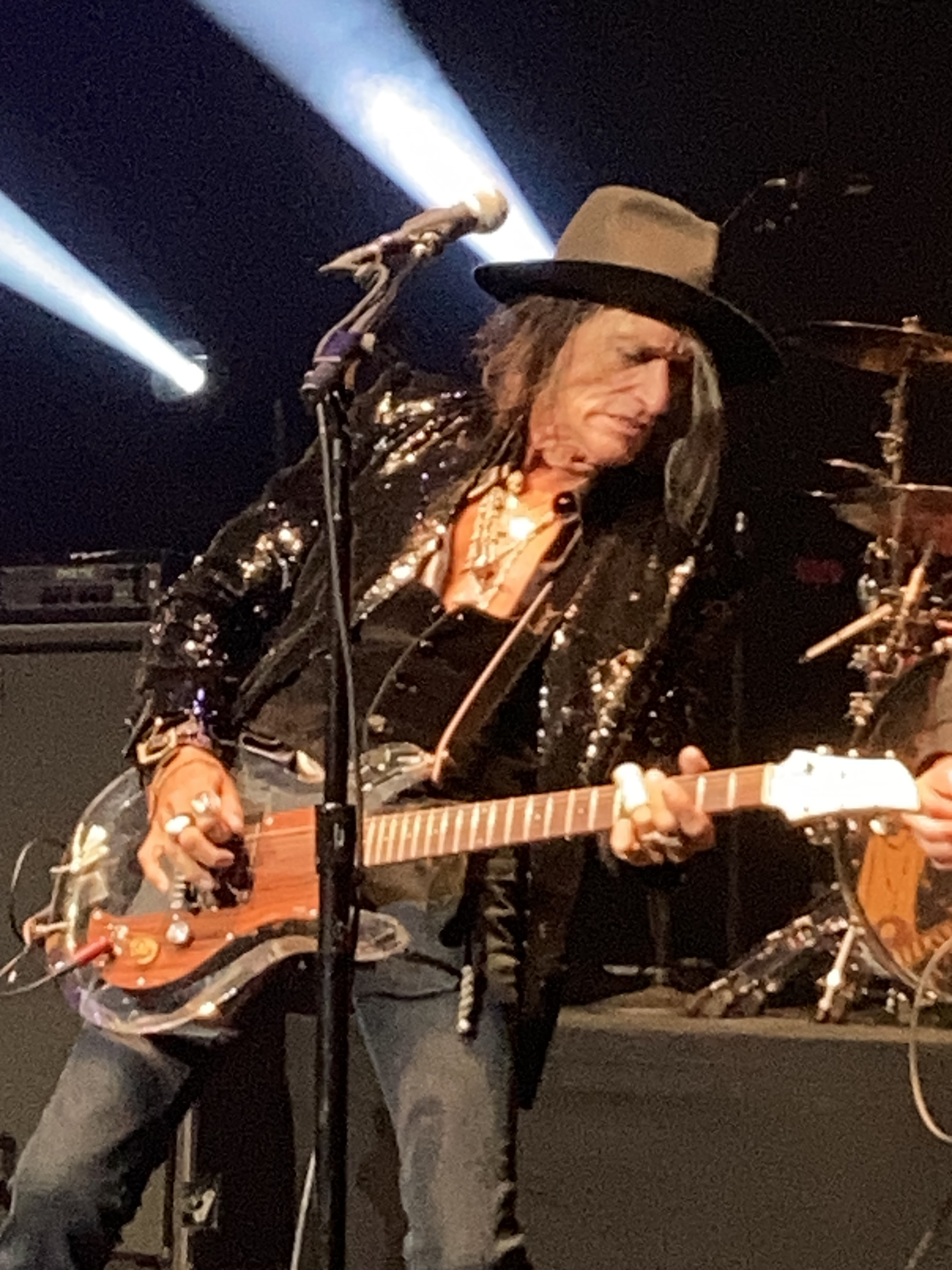
Joe Perry performs in Port Chester, New York with the Joe Perry Project in August, 2025.

In November 2017, Perry announced a January 2018 release date for his fourth solo album, Sweetzerland Manifesto. The album comprised ten tracks of new material and included guest musicians Johnny Depp, Robin Zander, David Johansen, and others. In November 2018, Perry released the first single off Sweetzerland Manifesto, entitled "Quake", with Aerosmith bandmate Brad Whitford and Gary Cherone of Extreme on board.

In 2019, Perry joined Aerosmith for a residency in Las Vegas called "Aerosmith: Deuces are Wild", a reference to both Las Vegas casino gambling and the band's 1994 single of the same name. The band's residency lasted from April 2019 to February 2020 at the Park Theater. Interspersed in the middle of the residency in July and August 2019, the band performed at a festival in Minnesota and played a total of nine shows spread across three MGM venues in Maryland, New Jersey, and Massachusetts.

On September 4, 2022, Perry joined Aerosmith for a concert at the Maine Savings Amphitheater during a warm-up show to prepare for their rescheduled 50th anniversary concert at Fenway Park. Originally scheduled for 2020, the concert was held on September 8, 2022, after the COVID-19 pandemic. This show broke Fenway Park's all-time attendance record with over 38.7K fans. Following the concert, Perry and Aerosmith returned to Las Vegas for a brief spell of shows from September to November 2022.

On September 2, 2023, Perry joined Aerosmith for their final tour beginning in Philadelphia. However, after the third show in Elmont, New York, Steven Tyler fractured his larynx and the band subsequently retired.

In April 2023, Perry reassembled the Joe Perry Project for 6 shows that month.

In August and September 2025, Perry played 10 more shows with the Joe Perry Project which included Aerosmith band member Brad Whitford, Stone Temple Pilots bassist Robert DeLeo, drummer Jason Sutter, keyboardist Buck Johnson, and Black Crowes vocalist Chris Robinson. For the final show at the Hollywood Bowl in Los Angeles, the band was joined by Guns N' Roses guitarist Slash for one song and Steven Tyler for two songs.

== Personal life ==
Perry was married to Elyssa Jerret from 1975 to 1982. Together they had a son, Adrian. With his second wife, Billie, whom he married in 1985, he has two sons, Tony and Roman. She has a son, Aaron, from a previous relationship. Adrian and Tony Perry are founding members of the rock group Dead Boots. As of 2014, Perry and his wife had homes in Vermont, Massachusetts, Florida, and Los Angeles.

Perry endorsed John McCain for the 2008 Presidential election, and described himself as a "lifelong Republican". "I love America", he said. "I love the culture. I love the freedom that it stands for. But I don't like the politics. I don't feel the people are represented the way they should be. So many things that made America great have been kinda stepped on by politicians. Politics is a business. First thing they do when they get into office is figure out how they're gonna get reelected."

Perry has spearheaded the creation of a line of hot sauces with Ashley Food Company: Joe Perry's Rock Your World Hot Sauces, featured widely in the marketplace. A quesadilla featuring a flavor of his hot sauce is available as an appetizer at Hard Rock Cafe. Perry was featured in an episode of TV's Inside Dish with Rachael Ray during a stop on an Aerosmith tour. He prepared a meal, displayed his passion for knives, discussed his hot sauce brand and cooking, and gave insight into meal preparations on tour.

Until 2006, Perry, with bandmate Steven Tyler and other partners, co-owned Mount Blue, a restaurant in Norwell, Massachusetts.

Perry resides in Massachusetts, and maintains a home in Pomfret, Vermont.

After performing at a Billy Joel concert at Madison Square Garden in November 2018, Perry collapsed in his dressing room. Perry had experienced a similar backstage collapse in July 2016 after performing with the Hollywood Vampires. Reportedly, his breathing problem appears to be congestion in the lungs, but Perry later blamed "dehydration and exhaustion" for his health issues.

As a result of his NYC collapse, Perry canceled his fall/winter Sweetzerland Manifesto concert tour in order to rest for the remainder of 2018.

== Influences ==
Perry is a devoted fan of the earlier works of Fleetwood Mac, particularly of their original frontman and lead guitarist, Peter Green, with tracks such as "Stop Messin' Round" and "Rattlesnake Shake" regularly covers in Aerosmith's live sets. Steven Tyler has even mentioned that hearing Perry play "Rattlesnake Shake" brought them together. He is also a huge fan of guitarist Jeff Beck and looked at him as one of his influences. Beck played onstage with Aerosmith in 1976, as a 'birthday present' for Perry. Perry was also strongly influenced by Jimi Hendrix as evidenced in particular by some of the playing on the Joe Perry Project track song "The Mist Is Rising", and his covering the Hendrix classic "Red House" both with the Project and later with Aerosmith. Perry also cites Johnny Winter as an important influence, stating "probably since I was about seventeen or eighteen. I've always loved his music." Perry is a huge fan of Led Zeppelin and Jimmy Page in particular. He and Steven Tyler had the honor of inducting Led Zeppelin into the Rock and Roll Hall of Fame in 1995, and specifically stated that Aerosmith would not exist in its current form without them.

== Equipment ==
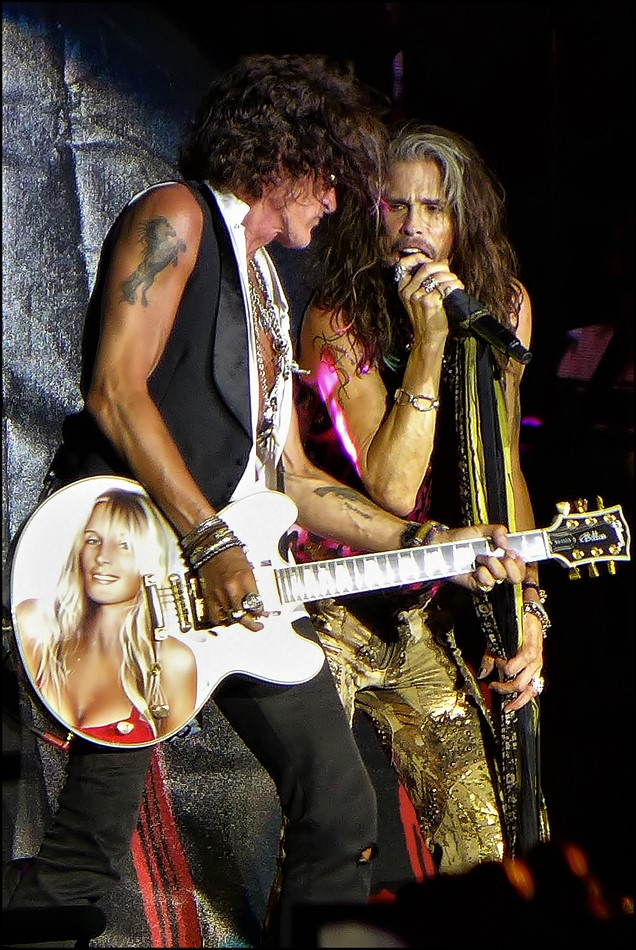
Perry (left) playing his "Billie" guitar (featuring an image of his wife Billie) while performing with Steven Tyler (right) on July 2, 2017

Perry has a collection of about 600 guitars. He prefers Gibson guitars, particularly the Les Paul, with a few models even recreated by the manufacturer as part of their Signature series. One of those, a 1959 Gibson Les Paul, had to be sold by Perry during his 1982 divorce. Later, Perry had his guitar tech and equipment managers search for this guitar. One day, Brad Whitford brought him a guitar magazine, and in the middle of the centerfold was Slash with the Les Paul in his hand. Perry immediately called Slash and bugged him for years, offering to pay more than the guitar's worth which had nearly tripled since Perry sold it. Eventually, he gave up as it was straining the pair's friendship. Many years later, at Joe's 50th birthday party, Slash finally gave him the guitar as a gift. He also owns various Gibson ES guitars (one of which features a painting of his wife Billie), and Gibson Firebirds.

== Discography ==
=== Studio albums ===
- Joe Perry (2005)
- Have Guitar, Will Travel (2009)
- Joe Perry's Merry Christmas (2014)
- Sweetzerland Manifesto (2018)
- Sweetzerland Manifesto MKII (2023)

=== with Aerosmith ===
- Aerosmith (1973)
- Get Your Wings (1974)
- Toys in the Attic (1975)
- Rocks (1976)
- Draw the Line (1977)
- Night in the Ruts (1979)
- Done with Mirrors (1985)
- Permanent Vacation (1987)
- Pump (1989)
- Get a Grip (1993)
- Nine Lives (1997)
- Just Push Play (2001)
- Honkin' on Bobo (2004)
- Music from Another Dimension! (2012)

=== with The Joe Perry Project ===
- Let the Music Do the Talking (1980)
- I've Got the Rock'n'Rolls Again (1981)
- Once a Rocker, Always a Rocker (1983)

=== with Hollywood Vampires ===
- Hollywood Vampires (2015)
- Rise (2019)
- Live In Rio (2023)

=== Guest appearances ===
- Played guitar on David Johansen's 1978 album
- Played guitar on Gene Simmons's 1978 album
- He performed the solo on the Eminem song "Sing for the Moment", which also sampled "Dream On".
- Played the solo on the Bon Jovi song "Last Chance Train" from the 100,000,000 Bon Jovi Fans Can't Be Wrong boxset.
- Appeared with Johnny Depp on Steve Hunter's The Manhattan Blues Project (2013).
- "Bad Man" (with Robin Thicke and Travis Barker from the Pitbull album Climate Change) (2016)
- Perry contributed guitar to the song "Rain & Dream" on the 2019 album New Love by B'z.
- "Get Ready" (with Blake Shelton from the Pitbull album Libertad 548) (2020)

==== Miscellaneous ====
- Perry and Steven Tyler were interviewed in the 1988 documentary The Decline of Western Civilization Part II: The Metal Years, which included interviews with other famous artists who influenced metal music, in addition to chronicling new, upcoming bands in the Los Angeles glam metal scene of the 1980s. The documentary featured many scenes and stories of rock stars engaging in excessive behavior, with Perry and Tyler talking about using "millions" of dollars worth of drugs in their interview.
- Perry and the rest of Aerosmith appeared as themselves in a 1991 episode of The Simpsons titled "Flaming Moe's.
- Perry wrote and performed the theme song to the Spider-Man animated series, which ran on Fox Kids from 1994 to 1998. Perry was only hired after a chance meeting with producer Avi Arad on a flight from New York to Los Angeles, where Perry expressed interest in doing a theme for the show.. In an episode of the series titled "The Alien Costume, Part One", Peter Parker uses the Symbiote suit to change into attire similar to that of Joe Perry's while riffs from the opening theme play in the background.
- Played a detective in the Homicide: Life on the Street episode "Brotherly Love", which aired in 1998. He was credited as "Anthony Joseph Perry".
- He performed a duet of "You Really Got Me" with Sanjaya Malakar on American Idol 6.
- Perry was a judge for the 5th annual Independent Music Awards to support independent artists' careers.

== See also ==
- The Joe Perry Project
- Toxic Twins
